= Baron Howard of Glossop =

Title in the Peerage of the United Kingdom

- Blazon Arms: Quarterly: 1st, Gules, a Bend between six Crosses-Crosslet fitchée Argent, on the bend an Escutcheon Or, charged with a Demi-Lion rampant pierced through the mouth with an Arrow within a Double Tressure flory counterflory all Gules, differenced by a Crescent (for Howard of Glossop); 2nd, Gules, three Lions passant guardant in pale Or, and in chief a Label of three-points Argent (for Brotherton); 3rd, Chequy Or and Azure, (for Warren); 4th, Gules, a Lion rampant Or (for Fitzalan). Crests: 1st: issuant from a Ducal Coronet Or, a Pair of Wings Gules, each charged with a Bend between six Crosses-Crosslet fitchée Argent (for Howard); 2nd: on a Chapeau Gules, turned up Ermine, a Lion statant guardant with tail extended Or, ducally gorged Argent (for Brotherton); 3rd: on a mount Vert, a Horse passant Argent, holding in the mouth a Slip of Oak fructed proper (for Fitzalan). Supporters: Dexter: a Lion Argent; Sinister: a Horse Argent, holding in the mouth a Sprig of Oak fructed proper, each charged on the shoulder with a Crescent for difference.
- Creation date: 9 December 1869
- Created by: Queen Victoria
- First holder: Edward Fitzalan-Howard, 1st Baron Howard of Glossop
- Present holder: Edward Fitzalan-Howard, 18th Duke of Norfolk
- Heir apparent: Henry Fitzalan-Howard, Earl of Arundel
- Status: Extant
- Motto: SOLA VIRTUS INVICTA (Virtue alone is unconquerable)
- Note: Since 1975 the Barony of Howard of Glossop has been held as a subsidiary title of the Duke of Norfolk

Baron Howard of Glossop, in the County of Derby, is a title in the Peerage of the United Kingdom, since 1975 a subsidiary title of the dukedom of Norfolk. It was created in 1869 for the Liberal politician Lord Edward Howard, the second son of Henry Fitzalan-Howard, 13th Duke of Norfolk. His grandson, the third Baron (who succeeded his father), married Mona Stapleton, 11th Baroness Beaumont. Their eldest son, Miles, succeeded his mother in the barony of Beaumont in 1971 and his father in the barony of Howard of Glossop in 1972. In 1975 he also succeeded in the dukedom of Norfolk on the death of his father's second cousin, Bernard Fitzalan-Howard, 16th Duke of Norfolk. The two baronies are now subsidiary titles of the dukedom of Norfolk. See this title for further history of the peerages.

== Barons Howard of Glossop (1869) ==
- Edward George Fitzalan-Howard, 1st Baron Howard of Glossop (1818–1883)
- Francis Edward Fitzalan-Howard, 2nd Baron Howard of Glossop (1859–1924)
- Bernard Edward Fitzalan-Howard, 3rd Baron Howard of Glossop (1885–1972)
- Miles Francis Stapleton Fitzalan-Howard, 4th Baron Howard of Glossop (1915–2002) (succeeded as 17th Duke of Norfolk in 1975)
- Edward William Fitzalan-Howard, 18th Duke of Norfolk (born in 1956)

== Family tree ==
Family tree of the Dukes of Norfolk and Suke of Surrey; Earls of Arundel, East Anglia, Norfolk, Norwich, Nottingham, and Surrey; and Barons Mowbray, Segrave and Stourton

Earl of East Anglia (Earls of Norfolk and Suffolk) (1st creation), a. 1069
Ralph the Staller c. 1011–1068; 1st Earl of Norfolk and Suffolk, or of the East Angles (Earl c. 1066/67 – 1068)
Earl of Surrey (1st creation), c. 1088
Ralph de Gael a. 1040–1100; 2nd Earl of Norfolk and Suffolk, or of the East Angles (Earl 1068–1074)	Roger Bigod (Bigot) d. 1107; Sheriff of Norfolk and Suffolk	William de Warenne c. 1035–1088; 1st Earl (of) Warenne / Earl of Surrey, Lord of Lewes, Seigneur de Varennes
Earldom forfeit, 1074
Earl of Norfolk (2nd creation), 1141
King Henry I c. 1068–1135	Maud Bigod	William Bigod d. 1120	Hugh Bigod; 1095–1177; 1st Earl of Norfolk (Earl 1141–1177)	William de Warenne d. 1138; 2nd Earl (of) Warenne / Earl of Surrey
Earl of Arundel, Earl of Sussex (1st creations), c. 1138
Empress Matilda c. 1102–1167	Geoffrey Plantagenet; 1113–1251; Count of Anjou	Adeliza of Louvain c. 1103–1151	William d'Aubigny c. 1109–1176; 1st Earl of Arundel (Sussex), Earl of Lincoln	William de Warenne; 1119–1148; 3rd Earl of Surrey
King Henry II; 1133–1189	William d'Aubigny b. c. 1138/1150–1176; 2nd Earl of Arundel (Sussex)	Roger Bigod c. 1144/1150–1221; 2nd Earl of Norfolk (Earl 1189–1221, disputed 1177–1189)	William of Blois c. 1137–1159	Isabel de Warenne c. 1130 – 1203; 4th Countess of Surrey suo jure	Hamelin de Warenne c. 1130–1202; Comte de Warenne / Earl of Surrey, jure uxoris
King John; 1166/1167–1216	William d'Aubigny a. 1180–1221; 3rd Earl of Arundel (Sussex)	Hugh Bigod; 1186–1225; 3rd Earl of Norfolk (Earl 1221–1225)	Maud Marshal; 1192–1248	William de Warenne c. 1160s/1170s–1240 5th Earl of Surrey
William d'Aubigny c. 1203–a. 1124; 4th Earl of Arundel (Sussex)	Hugh d'Aubigny d. 1243; 5th Earl of Arundel (Sussex)	Isabel d'Aubigny	John Fitzalan; 1200–1240; Lord of Clun and Oswestry	Roger Bigod c. 1209–1270; 4th Earl of Norfolk (Earl 1233–1270)	Hugh Bigod c. 1211–1266
Earl of Sussex (1st creation), 1282
King Henry III; 1207–1272	John Fitzalan; 1223–1267; 6th Earl of Arundel (Sussex), jure matris	John de Warenne; 1231–1304; 1st Earl of Sussex (Earl of Sussex 1282–1304), 6th Earl of Surrey (Earl of Surrey 1240–1304)
Baron Segrave of Se(a)grave, 1283
Nicholas Segrave c. 1238–a. 1295; 1st Baron Segrave	King Edward I 1239–1307	Edmund Crouchback; 1245–1296; Earl of Lancaster	John Fitzalan; 1246–1272; 7th Earl of Arundel (Sussex), jure matris	Roger Bigod c. 1245–1306; 5th Earl of Norfolk (Earl 1270–1306)
Earldom extinct, 1270
Baron Mowbray, 1283	Earl of Arundel (2nd (1st by writ) creation), 1289
John Segrave c. 1256–1325; 2nd Baron Segrave	Roger de Mowbray; 1254–1297; 1st Baron Mowbray	Richard Fitzalan; 1267–1302; 1st (or 6th) Earl of Arundel	William de Warenne; 1256–1286
Earl of Norfolk (3rd creation), 1312
Stephen Segrave d. 1325; 3rd Baron Segrave	Thomas of Brotherton; 1300–1338; 1st Earl of Norfolk (Earl 1312–1338)	John Mowbray; 1286–1322; 2nd Baron Mowbray	Henry c. 1281–1345; Earl of Leicester, Earl of Lancaster	Edmund Fitzalan; 1286–1326; 2nd (or 7th) Earl of Arundel	Alice de Warenne; 1287–1388 heir apparent to the Earldom of Surrey	John de Warenne; 1286–1347; 7th Earl of Surrey, 2nd Earl of Sussex
Earldom of Arundel (2nd creation) forfeit, 1326	Earldom of Sussex extinct(?), 1347
Earldom of Arundel (2nd creation) restored, 1331
John Segrave; 1315–1353; 4th Baron Segrave	Margaret of Brotherton; 1320–1399; Duchess of Norfolk "for life" (Duchess 1397–1399), 2nd Countess of Norfolk (Countess 1338–1399),	John Mowbray; 1310–1361; 3rd Baron Mowbray	Joan of Lancaster c. 1312–1349	Eleanor of Lancaster; 1318–1372	Richard FitzAlan c. 1313–1376; 3rd (or 8th) Earl of Arundel (Earl of Arundel 1331–1376), 8th Earl of Surrey (Earl of Surrey 1347–1376)
Baron Arundel, 1377
Elizabeth de Segrave; 1338–1368; 5th Baroness Segrave	John de Mowbray; 1340–1368; 4th Baron Mowbray	Richard FitzAlan; 1346–1397; 4th (or 9th) Earl of Arundel, 9th Earl of Surrey	John FitzAlan c. 1348–1379; 1st Baron Arundel	Alice FitzAlan
Earldom of Arundel (2nd creation) forfeit, 1397
Earl of Nottingham (1st creation), 1377	Earl of Nottingham (2nd creation), 1383; Duke of Norfolk (1st creation), 1397	Duke of Surrey, 1397
John de Mowbray; 1365–1383; Earl of Nottingham (Earl 1377–1383), 6th Baron Segrave, 5th Baron Mowbray (Baron 1368–1383)	Thomas de Mowbray; 1366–1399; 1st Duke of Norfolk, etc. (Duke 1397–1399), 3rd Earl of Norfolk (Earl 1399), 7th Baron Segrave, 6th Baron Mowbray (Baron 1377–1399)	Elizabeth Fitzalan; 1366–1425	John FitzAlan; 1364–1390; 2nd Baron Arundel	Thomas Holland; 1372–1400; Duke of Surrey, Earl of Kent, Baron Holland
Earldom of Nottingham extinct, 1383	Titles forfeit, 1399	Dukedom of Surrey renounced, 1400
Baron Stourton, 1448	Duke of Norfolk (1st creation restored), 1425	Earldom of Arundel (2nd creation) restored, 1400
John Stourton; 1400–1462; 1st Baron Stourton (Baron 1448–1462)	Thomas de Mowbray; 1385–1405; 4th Earl of Norfolk, 8th Baron Segrave, 7th Baron Mowbray (Earl 1399–1405)	John de Mowbray; 1392–1432; 2nd Duke of Norfolk (Duke 1425–1432), 5th Earl of Norfolk, 9th Baron Segrave, 8th Baron Mowbray (Earl 1405–1432)	Margaret de Mowbray c. 1388–1459	Robert Howard; 1385–1436	Isabel de Mowbray c. 1400–1452	Thomas FitzAlan; 1381–1415; 5th (or 10th) Earl of Arundel, 10th Earl of Surrey	John Fitzalan; 1385–1421; 6th (or 11th) Earl of Arundel, 3rd Baron Arundel, 3rd Baron Maltravers
Duke of Norfolk (4th creation), 1483
William Stourton a. 1426–1478; 2nd Baron Stourton (Baron 1462–1478)	John de Mowbray; 1415–1461; 3rd Duke of Norfolk, 6th Earl of Norfolk, 10th Baron Segrave, 9th Baron Mowbray (Duke 1432–1461)	John Howard; 1425–1485; 1st Duke of Norfolk, 13th Baron Segrave, 12th Baron Mowbray (Duke 1483–1485)	John Fitzalan; 1408–1435; 7th (or 12th) Earl of Arundel, 4th Baron Arundel, 4th Baron Maltravers	William Fitzalan; 1417–1487; 9th (or 14th) Earl of Arundel, 6th Baron Arundel, 6th Baron Maltravers
Titles forfeit, 1485
Earl of Surrey (2nd creation), 1451	Duke of Norfolk (4th creation) restored and Earl of Surrey, 1514
John Stourton c. 1454–1485; 3rd Baron Stourton (Baron 1479–1485)	William Stourton c. 1457–1524; 5th Baron Stourton (Baron 1487–1524)	John de Mowbray; 1444–1476; 4th Duke of Norfolk, 7th Earl of Norfolk, 11th Baron Segrave, 10th Baron Mowbray (Duke 1461–1476), Earl of Surrey (Earl 1451–1476)	King Edward IV; 1442–1483	Thomas Howard; 1443–1524; 2nd Duke of Norfolk, 1st Earl of Surrey (Duke 1514–1524)	Humfrey Fitzalan; 1429–1438; 8th (or 13th) Earl of Arundel, 5th Baron Arundel, 5th Baron Maltravers	Thomas Fitzalan; 1450–1524; 10th (or 15th) Earl of Arundel, 7th Baron Arundel, 7th Baron Maltravers
Dukedom of Norfolk, Earldom of Nottingham, Earldom of Surrey extinct, 1476
Duke of Norfolk (3rd creation), Earl of Nottingham (3rd creation), and Earl of Surrey, 1477
Francis Stourton; 1485–1487; 4th Baron Stourton (Baron 1485–1487)	Edward Stourton; 1463–1535; 6th Baron Stourton (Baron 1524–1535)	Anne de Mowbray; 1472–1481; 8th Countess of Norfolk, 12th Baroness Segrave, 11th Baroness Mowbray (Countess 1476–1481)	Richard of Shrewsbury; 1473–1483; Duke of York, Duke of Norfolk, Earl of Nottingham, Earl of Warenne (Duke 1477–1483)	Anne of York; 1475–1511	Thomas Howard; 1473–1554; 3rd Duke of Norfolk, 2nd Earl of Surrey (Duke 1524–1554)	Edmund Howard c. 1478–1539	Elizabeth Boleyn c. 1480–1538	William Fitzalan; 1476–1544; 11th (or 16th) Earl of Arundel, 8th Baron Arundel, 8th Baron Maltravers
Earldom of Norfolk extinct and Baronies Segrave and Mowbray in abeyance, 1481	Dukedom of Norfolk, Earldom of Nottingham, Earldom of Surrey extinct, 1483	Attainted, 1547; Restored, 1553
William Stourton c. 1505–1548; 7th Baron Stourton	Earl of Nottingham (5th creation), 1525	King Henry VIII; 1491–1547	Anne Boleyn c. 1501 or 1507–1536
Viscount Howard of Bindon, 1559
Charles Stourton c. 1520–1557; 8th Baron Stourton	Henry Howard; 1517–1547 styled Earl of Surrey	Thomas Howard c. 1520–1582; 1st Viscount Howard of Bindon	Mary FitzRoy; 1519–1557	Henry FitzRoy; 1519–1536; Duke of Richmond and Somerset, Earl of Nottingham	Catherine Howard c. 1524–1542	Henry Fitzalan; 1512–1580; 12th (or 17th) Earl of Arundel, 9th Baron Arundel, 9th Baron Maltravers
Earldom of Nottingham extinct, 1536
Thomas Howard; 1536–1572; 4th Duke of Norfolk, 3rd Earl of Surrey, 13th Baron Mowbray (Duke 1554–1572)	Henry Howard; 1540–1614; Earl of Northampton	Queen Elizabeth I 1533–1603	Mary FitzAlan; 1540–1557
Dukedom (3rd creation) forfeit, 1572
Earl of Arundel (3rd creation), 1580	Earl of Suffolk (4th creation), 1603
John Stourton; 1553–1588; 9th Baron Stourton	Edward Stourton c. 1555–1633; 10th Baron Stourton	Philip Howard; 1557–1595; 20th/13th/1st Earl of Arundel, styled Earl of Surrey	Thomas Howard; 1561–1626; Earl of Suffolk	Lord William Howard; 1563–1640
Earldom of Arundel and Barony of Mowbray attainted, 1589	see Earls, Marquesses, and Dukes of Suffolk family tree
Earl of Arundel (3rd creation) and Barony of Mowbray restored, 1604; Earl of Norfolk (5th creation), 1644
William Stourton c. 1594–1672; 11th Baron Stourton	Thomas Howard; 1585–1646; 21st/14th/2nd Earl of Arundel, 2nd/4th Earl of Surrey, 1st Earl of Norfolk, 14th Baron Mowbray (Earl 1644–1646)	Philip
see Earls of Shrewsbury family tree
Edward Stourton; 1617–1644	Alethea Talbot; 1585–1654; 17th Baroness Strange of Blackmere, 14th Baroness Talbot, 13th Baroness Furnivall	Henry Frederick Howard; 1608–1652; 22nd/15th/3rd Earl of Arundel, 3rd/5th Earl of Surrey, 2nd Earl of Norfolk, 15th Baron Mowbray (Earl 1646–1652)	William Howard; 1614–1680; Viscount Stafford	William
Duke of Norfolk (4th creation restored), 1660	Baron Howard of Castle Rising, 1669; Earl of Norwich (3rd creation), 1672
William Stourton d. 1685; 12th Baron Stourton	Thomas Howard; 1627–1677; 5th Duke of Norfolk, 21st/14th/2nd Earl of Arundel, 4th/6th Earl of Surrey, 16th Baron Mowbray (Duke 1660–1677) 18th Baron Strange of Blackmere, 15th Baron Talbot, 14th Baron Furnivall (Baron 1654–1677)	Henry Howard; 1628–1684; 6th Duke of Norfolk, 22nd/15th/3rd Earl of Arundel, 5th/7th Earl of Surrey; 18th Baron Strange of Blackmere, 17th Baron Mowbray, 15th Baron Talbot, 14th Baron Furnivall (Duke 1677–1684) 1st Earl of Norwich, etc. (Earl 1672–1684)	Charles Howard; 1630–1713	Col. Bernard Howard; 1641–1717	Charles Howard; 1628–1685; Earl of Carlisle
Edward Stourton; 1665–1720; 13th Baron Stourton	Thomas Stourton; 1667–1744; 14th Baron Stourton	Charles Stourton; 1669–1739	Henry Howard; 1655–1701; 7th Duke of Norfolk, 22nd/15th/3rd Earl of Arundel, 5th/7th Earl of Surrey, 2nd Earl of Norwich, etc. 18th Baron Mowbray, 19th Baron Strange of Blackmere, 15th Baron Talbot, 14th Baron Furnivall (Duke 1684–1701)	Lord Thomas Howard; 1662–1689	Henry Charles Howard d. 1720
Thomas Howard; 1683–1732; 8th Duke of Norfolk, 23rd/16th/4th Earl of Arundel, 6th/8th Earl of Surrey, 3rd Earl of Norwich, etc. 18th Baron Strange of Blackmere, 15th Baron Talbot, 14th Baron Furnivall, 19th Baron Mowbray (Duke 1701–1732)	Edward Howard; 1685–1777; 9th Duke of Norfolk, 24th/17th/5th Earl of Arundel, 7th/9th Earl of Surrey, 4th Earl of Norwich, etc. 20th Baron Mowbray, 20th Baron Strange of Blackmere, 15th Baron Talbot, 14th Baron Furnivall (Duke 1732–1777)	Philip Howard; 1688–1750	Bernard Howard; 1674–1735
Earldom of Norwich (3rd creation) and Barony of Howard of Castle Rising extinct and Baronies of Furnivall, Mowbray, Segrave, Strange of Blackmere, and Talbot abeyant, 1777
Charles Stourton; 1702–1753; 15th Baron Stourton	William Stourton; 1704–1781; 16th Baron Stourton	Winifred Howard; 1726–1753	Anne Howard; 1742–1787	Charles Howard; 1720–1786; 10th Duke of Norfolk, 25th/18th/6th Earl of Arundel, 8th/10th Earl of Surrey (Duke 1777–1786)	Henry Howard; 1713–1787
Charles Philip Stourton; 1752–1816; 17th Baron Stourton	Charles Howard; 1746–1815; 11th Duke of Norfolk, 26th/19th/7th Earl of Arundel, 9th/11th Earl of Surrey (Duke 1786–1815)
William Stourton; 1776–1846; 18th Baron Stourton	Bernard Howard; 1765–1842; 12th Duke of Norfolk, 27th/20th/8th Earl of Arundel, 10th/12th Earl of Surrey (Duke 1815–1842)	Henry Howard-Molyneux-Howard; 1766–1824
Charles Stourton; 1802–1872; 19th Baron Stourton	Henry Howard; 1791–1856; 13th Duke of Norfolk, 28th/21st/9th Earl of Arundel, 11th/13th Earl of Surrey (Duke 1842–1856)	Henry Howard-Molyneux-Howard; 1802–1875
Baron Mowbray and Baron Segrave abeayance restored, 1878	Baron Howard of Glossop, 1869
Alfred Joseph Stourton; 1829–1893; 24th Baron Segrave, 21st/23rd Baron Mowbray, 20th Baron Stourton	Henry Granville Fitzalan-Howard; 1815–1860; 14th Duke of Norfolk, 29th/22nd/10th Earl of Arundel, 12th/14th Earl of Surrey (Duke 1856–1860)	Edward George Fitzalan-Howard; 1818–1883; 1st Baron Howard of Glossop
Baron Howard of Penrith, 1830
Charles Botolph Joseph Stourton; 1867–1936; 25th Baron Segrave, 22nd/24th Baron Mowbray, 21st Baron Stourton	Henry Fitzalan-Howard; 1847–1917; 15th Duke of Norfolk, 30th/23rd/11th Earl of Arundel, 13th/15th Earl of Surrey, Lord Maltravers, Earl of Arundel and Surrey (Duke 1860–1917)	Francis Fitzalan-Howard; 1859–1924; 2nd Baron Howard of Glossop	Esmé Howard; 1863–1939; 1st Baron Howard of Penrith
William Marmaduke Stourton; 1895–1965; 26th Baron Segrave, 23rd/25th Baron Mowbray, 22nd Baron Stourton	Bernard Fitzalan-Howard; 1908–1975; 16th Duke of Norfolk, 31st/24th/12th Earl of Arundel, 14th/16th Earl of Surrey (Duke 1917–1975)	Bernard Edward Fitzalan-Howard; 1885–1972; 3rd Baron Howard of Glossop	Francis Howard; 1905–1999; 2nd Baron Howard of Penrith
Charles Edward Stourton; 1923–2006; 27th Baron Segrave, 24th/26th Baron Mowbray, 23rd Baron Stourton	Miles Fitzalan-Howard; 1915–2002; 17th Duke of Norfolk, 32nd/25th/13th Earl of Arundel, 15th/17th Earl of Surrey, 4th Baron Howard of Glossop (Duke 1975–2002) m. Mary Teresa Constable-Maxwell
Edward William Stephen Stourton; 1953–2021; 28th Baron Segrave, 25th/27th Baron Mowbray, 24th Baron Stourton	Marsha Howard b. 1953	Edward Fitzalan-Howard b. 1956; 18th Duke of Norfolk, 33rd/26th/14th Earl of Arundel, 16th/18th Earl of Surrey, 5th Baron Howard of Glossop (from 2002) m. Georgina Susan Gore	Philip Esmé Howard b. 1945; 3rd Baron Howard of Penrith
Sarah Louise Stourton b. 1982	Isabella Laura Stourton b. 1983	Camilla Charlotte Stourton b. 1987	Francesca Jane Stourton b. 1988	James Charles Peter Stourton b. 1991; 29th Baron Segrave, 26th/28th Baron Mowbray, 25th Baron Stourton	Henry Fitzalan-Howard b. 1987 styled Earl of Arundel and Surrey	Thomas Philip Howard b. 1974
Co-heir presumptive to the Baronies Segrave, Mowbray, and Stourton	Co-heir presumptive to the Baronies Segrave, Mowbray, and Stourton	Co-heir presumptive to the Baronies Segrave, Mowbray, and Stourton	Co-heir presumptive to the Baronies Segrave, Mowbray, and Stourton	Heir apparent to the dukedom	Heir apparent to the Barony Howard of Penrith

== See also ==
- Duke of Norfolk
- Earl of Carlisle
- Earl of Suffolk
- Earl of Berkshire
- Earl of Effingham
- Viscount Fitzalan of Derwent
- Baron Lanerton
- Baron Howard of Penrith
- Baron Howard of Escrick
- Baron Stafford
- Baron Howard de Walden
