= Henry Fitzalan-Howard, 14th Duke of Norfolk =

British nobleman and politician

His Grace The Duke of Norfolk
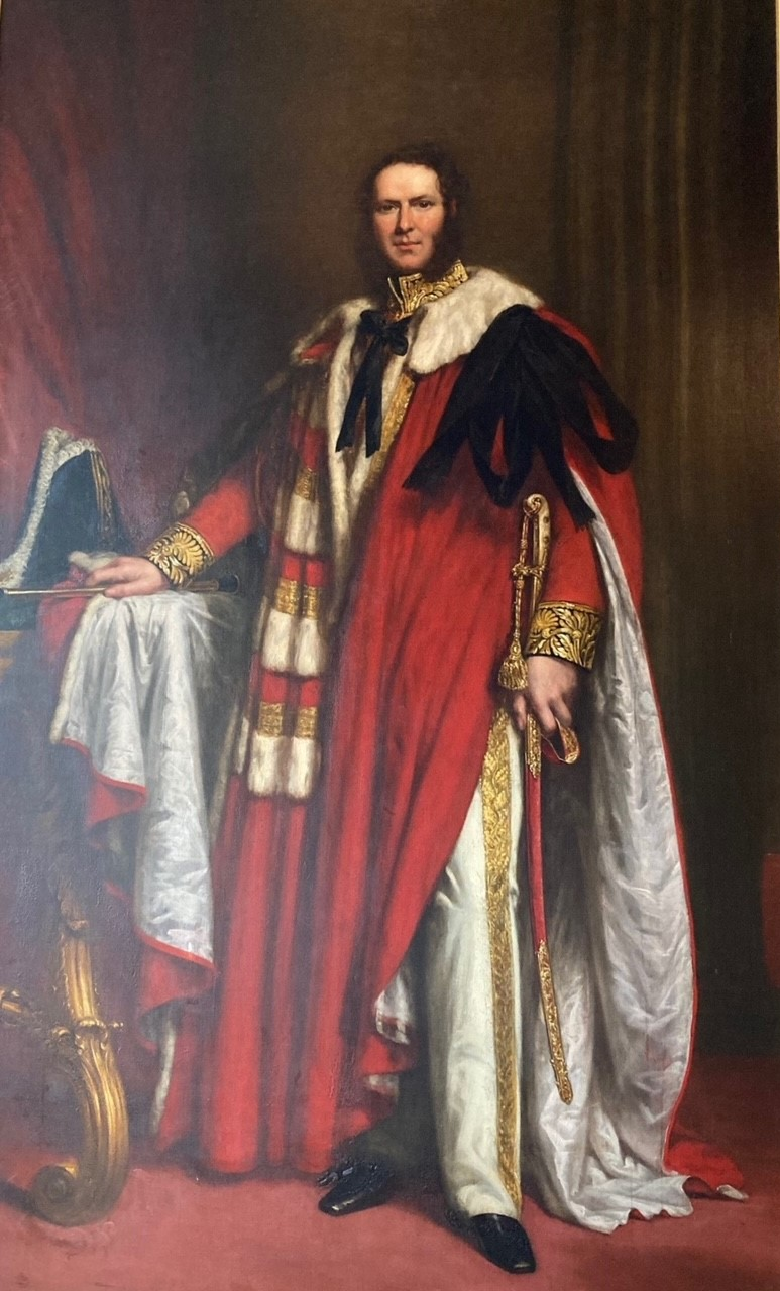

Earl Marshal
- In office 18 February 1856 – 25 November 1860
- Monarch: Victoria
- Preceded by: The 13th Duke of Norfolk
- Succeeded by: The 15th Duke of Norfolk

Member of the House of Lords Lord Temporal
- In office 18 February 1856 – 25 November 1860; Hereditary Peerage
- Preceded by: The 13th Duke of Norfolk
- Succeeded by: The 15th Duke of Norfolk

Member of Parliament for Limerick City
- In office 1851–1852

Member of Parliament for Arundel
- In office 1837–1851

Personal details
- Born: 7 November 1815
- Died: 25 November 1860 (aged 45)
- Spouse(s): Augusta Lyons, daughter of Edmund Lyons, 1st Baron Lyons
- Children: 11, including: Henry Fitzalan-Howard, 15th Duke of Norfolk; Lady Philippa Stewart; Edmund FitzAlan-Howard, 1st Viscount FitzAlan of Derwent
- Parents: Henry Howard, 13th Duke of Norfolk (father); Charlotte Sophia Leveson-Gower (mother)

Henry Granville Fitzalan-Howard, 14th Duke of Norfolk, (né Howard; 7 November 1815 – 25 November 1860) was a British peer and politician. He was hereditary Earl Marshal and the last undisputed Chief Butler of England.

== Family ==
He was the son of Henry Charles Howard, 13th Duke of Norfolk, and Lady Charlotte Sophia Leveson-Gower.

He married Augusta Lyons (1821–1886), of the Lyons family, on 19 June 1839. She was the daughter of Sir Edmund Lyons (later 1st Baron Lyons) and Augusta Louisa Rogers, and was often known by her middle name, "Minna". The Duke had eleven children by Augusta. The Duke and Duchess are both buried in the mausoleum in Fitzalan Chapel on the western grounds of Arundel Castle.

His surname at birth was Howard; by royal licence dated 26 April 1842, his father (then Duke) added "Fitzalan" before his children's surnames, so they all became Fitzalan-Howard, which surname their male-line descendants have borne ever since. Their ancestor, Thomas Howard, 4th Duke of Norfolk, married Mary FitzAlan (daughter and heiress of Henry Fitzalan, 12th Earl of Arundel) in 1555.

== Public life ==
Howard was returned as a Whig for Arundel in the British House of Commons from 1837 to 1851, and for Limerick City from 1851 to 1852. He was a devoted Roman Catholic, and resigned from his Arundel seat rather than support the Ecclesiastical Titles Act 1851, but secured the Limerick seat when its incumbent, John O'Connell, resigned in his favour. He edited the Lives of Philip Howard, earl of Arundel, and of Anne Dacres, his wife (1857 and 1861). He raised the 9th (Arundel) Sussex Rifle Volunteer Corps on 28 February 1860 and commanded it as Captain.

== Private life ==
The Norfolk Royale Hotel in Bournemouth was originally built as a villa for the duke.

== Family ==
=== Issue ===
Name	Birth	Death	Notes
Lady Victoria Alexandrina Fitzalan-Howard	1840	1870	Married 1861, James Robert Hope-Scott
Lady Minna Charlotte Fitzalan-Howard	1843	1921	Carmelite nun
Lady Mary Adeliza Fitzalan-Howard	1845	1925
Henry Fitzalan-Howard, 15th Duke of Norfolk	1847	1917	15th Duke of Norfolk
Lady Etheldreda Fitzalan-Howard	1849	1926	Sister of Charity
Lady Philippa Fitzalan-Howard	1852	1946	Married 1888, Sir Edward Stewart, had 6 children. (1857–1948)
Philip Thomas Fitzalan-Howard	1853	1855
Lord Edmund Bernard FitzAlan-Howard	1855	1947	Created Viscount FitzAlan of Derwent; Married 1879, Lady Mary Caroline Bertie (1859–1938)
Lady Anne Fitzalan-Howard	1857	1931	Married 1878, Maj-Gen. Lord Ralph Drury Kerr (1837–1916), son of the 7th Marquess of Lothian
Lady Elizabeth Mary Fitzalan-Howard	1859	1859
Lady Margaret Fitzalan-Howard	1860	1899	Founded the Catholic Social Union

=== Family tree ===
Family tree of the Dukes of Norfolk; Earls of Arundel, East Anglia, Norfolk, Norwich, Nottingham, and Surrey; and Barons Mowbray, Segrave and Stourton

Earl of East Anglia (Earls of Norfolk and Suffolk) (1st creation), before 1069
Ralph the Staller (c. 1011–1068); 1st Earl of Norfolk and Suffolk, or of the East Angles c. 1066/67–1068
Ralph de Gael (c. 1040 – c. 1096); 2nd Earl of Norfolk and Suffolk, or of the East Angles until 1074
Earldom forfeit, 1074	Earl of Norfolk (2nd creation), 1141
Hugh Bigod (1095–1177); 1st Earl of Norfolk 1141–1177
Roger Bigod (c. 1144/1150–1221); 2nd Earl of Norfolk 1189–1221 (disputed 1177–1189)
Hugh Bigod (1186–1225); 3rd Earl of Norfolk 1221–1225
Baron Segrave of Se(a)grave, 1283
Nicholas Segrave (c. 1238–bef. 1295); 1st Baron Segrave	Roger Bigod (c. 1209–1270); 4th Earl of Norfolk 1233–1270	Hugh Bigod (c. 1211–1266)
Baron Mowbray, 1283
John Segrave (c. 1256–1325); 2nd Baron Segrave	King Edward I (1239–1307)	Roger de Mowbray (1254–1297); 1st Baron Mowbray	Roger Bigod (c. 1245–1306); 5th Earl of Norfolk 1270–1306
Earldom extinct, 1270
Earl of Norfolk (3rd creation), 1312
Stephen Segrave (d. 1325); 3rd Baron Segrave	Thomas of Brotherton (1300–1338); 1st Earl of Norfolk 1312–1338	John Mowbray (1286–1322); 2nd Baron Mowbray
John Segrave (1315–1353); 4th Baron Segrave	Margaret of Brotherton (1320–1399); 2nd Countess of Norfolk 1338–1399, Duchess of Norfolk "for life" 1397–1399	John Mowbray (1310–1361); 3rd Baron Mowbray
Elizabeth de Segrave (1338–1368); 5th Baroness Segrave	John de Mowbray (1340–1368); 4th Baron Mowbray
Earl of Nottingham (1st creation), 1377	Earl of Nottingham (2nd creation), 1383; Duke of Norfolk (1st creation), 1397
John de Mowbray (1365–1383); 1st Earl of Nottingham, 6th Baron Segrave, 5th Baron Mowbray	Thomas de Mowbray (1366–1399); 1st Duke of Norfolk 1397–1399, 3rd Earl of Norfolk 1399, 7th Baron Segrave, 6th Baron Mowbray
Earldom of Nottingham extinct, 1383	Titles forfeit, 1399
Baron Stourton, 1448	Duke of Norfolk (1st creation restored), 1425
John Stourton (1400–1462); 1st Baron Stourton, 1448–1462	Thomas de Mowbray (1385–1405); 4th Earl of Norfolk, 8th Baron Segrave, 7th Baron Mowbray 1399–1405	John de Mowbray (1392–1432); 2nd Duke of Norfolk 1425–1432, 5th Earl of Norfolk, 9th Baron Segrave, 8th Baron Mowbray 1405–1432	Margaret de Mowbray (c. 1388–1459)	Robert Howard (1385–1436)	Isabel de Mowbray (c. 1400–1452)	James Berkeley, 1st Baron Berkeley (c. 1394–1463)
Duke of Norfolk (4th creation), 1483
William Stourton (before 1426–1478); 2nd Baron Stourton, 1462–1478	John de Mowbray (1415–1461); 3rd Duke of Norfolk, 6th Earl of Norfolk, 10th Baron Segrave, 9th Baron Mowbray 1432–1461	John Howard (1425–1485); 1st Duke of Norfolk, 13th Baron Segrave, 12th Baron Mowbray 1483–1485
Titles forfeit, 1485
Earl of Surrey (2nd creation), 1451	Duke of Norfolk (4th creation) restored and Earl of Surrey, 1514
John Stourton (c. 1454–1485); 3rd Baron Stourton, 1479–1485	William Stourton (c. 1457–1524); 5th Baron Stourton, 1487–1524	John de Mowbray (1444–1476); 4th Duke of Norfolk, 7th Earl of Norfolk, Earl of Surrey, 11th Baron Segrave, 10th Baron Mowbray 1461–1476	King Edward IV (1442–1483)	Thomas Howard (1443–1524); 2nd Duke of Norfolk, 1st Earl of Surrey 1514–1524
Dukedom of Norfolk, Earldom of Nottingham, Earldom of Surrey extinct, 1476
Duke of Norfolk (3rd creation), Earl of Nottingham (3rd creation), and Earl of Surrey, 1477
Francis Stourton (1485–1487); 4th Baron Stourton, 1485–1487	Edward Stourton (1463–1535); 6th Baron Stourton, 1524–1535	Anne de Mowbray (1472–1481); 8th Countess of Norfolk, 12th Baroness Segrave, 11th Baroness Mowbray 1476–1481	Richard of Shrewsbury (1473–1483); Duke of York, Duke of Norfolk, Earl of Nottingham, Earl of Warenne 1477–1483	Anne of York (1475–1511)	Thomas Howard (1473–1554); 3rd Duke of Norfolk, 2nd Earl of Surrey 1524–1554	Edmund Howard (c. 1478–1539)	Elizabeth Boleyn (c. 1480–1538)
Earldom of Norfolk extinct and Baronies Segrave and Mowbray in abeyance, 1481	Dukedom of Norfolk, Earldom of Nottingham, Earldom of Surrey extinct, 1483	Attainted, 1547; Restored, 1553
William Stourton (c. 1505–1548); 7th Baron Stourton	Earl of Nottingham (5th creation), 1525	King Henry VIII (1491–1547)	Anne Boleyn (c. 1501 or 1507–1536)
Charles Stourton (c. 1520–1557); 8th Baron Stourton	Henry Howard (1517–1547) styled Earl of Surrey	Thomas Howard (c. 1520–1582); Viscount Howard of Bindon	Mary FitzRoy (1519–1557)	Henry FitzRoy (1519–1536); Duke of Richmond and Somerset, Earl of Nottingham	Catherine Howard (c. 1524–1542)
Earldom of Nottingham extinct, 1536
Thomas Howard (1536–1572); 4th Duke of Norfolk, 3rd Earl of Surrey, 13th Baron Mowbray 1554–1572	Henry Howard (1540–1614); Earl of Northampton	Queen Elizabeth I (1533–1603)
Dukedom (3rd creation) forfeit, 1572
Earl of Arundel (3rd creation), 1580	Earl of Suffolk (4th creation), 1603
John Stourton (1553–1588); 9th Baron Stourton	Edward Stourton (c. 1555–1633); 10th Baron Stourton	Philip Howard (1557–1595); 20th/13th/1st Earl of Arundel, styled Earl of Surrey	Thomas Howard (1561–1626); Earl of Suffolk	Lord William Howard (1563–1640)
Earldom of Arundel and Barony of Mowbray attainted, 1589	see Earls, Marquesses, and Dukes of Suffolk family tree
Earl of Arundel (3rd creation) and Barony of Mowbray restored, 1604; Earl of Norfolk (5th creation), 1644
William Stourton (c. 1594–1672); 11th Baron Stourton	Thomas Howard (1585–1646); 21st/14th/2nd Earl of Arundel, 2nd/4th Earl of Surrey, 1st Earl of Norfolk, 14th Baron Mowbray 1644–1646
see Earls of Shrewsbury family tree
Edward Stourton (1617–1644)	Henry Frederick Howard (1608–1652); 22nd/15th/3rd Earl of Arundel, 3rd/5th Earl of Surrey, 2nd Earl of Norfolk, 15th Baron Mowbray 1646–1652	Alethea Howard; 1585–1654; 17th Baroness Strange of Blackmere, 14th Baroness Talbot, 13th Baroness Furnivall
Duke of Norfolk (4th creation restored), 1660	Baron Howard of Castle Rising, 1669; Earl of Norwich (3rd creation), 1672
William Stourton (d. 1685); 12th Baron Stourton	Thomas Howard (1627–1677); 5th Duke of Norfolk, 21st/14th/2nd Earl of Arundel, 4th/6th Earl of Surrey, 16th Baron Mowbray 1660–1677; 18th Baron Strange of Blackmere, 15th Baron Talbot, 14th Baron Furnivall 1654–1677	Henry Howard (1628–1684); 6th Duke of Norfolk, 22nd/15th/3rd Earl of Arundel, 5th/7th Earl of Surrey, 1st Earl of Norwich and Baron Howard of Castle Rising, 18th Baron Strange of Blackmere, 17th Baron Mowbray, 15th Baron Talbot, 14th Baron Furnivall 1672–1684	Hon. Charles Howard (1630–1713)	Col. Bernard Howard (1641–1717)
Edward Stourton (1665–1720); 13th Baron Stourton	Thomas Stourton (1667–1744); 14th Baron Stourton	Charles Stourton (1669–1739)	Henry Howard (1655–1701); 7th Duke of Norfolk, 22nd/15th/3rd Earl of Arundel, 5th/7th Earl of Surrey, 2nd Earl of Norwich and Baron Howard of Castle Rising, 18th Baron Mowbray, 19th Baron Strange of Blackmere, 15th Baron Talbot, 14th Baron Furnivall, 1684–1701	Lord Thomas Howard (1662–1689)	Henry Charles Howard (d. 1720)
Thomas Howard (1683–1732); 8th Duke of Norfolk, 23rd/16th/4th Earl of Arundel, 6th/8th Earl of Surrey, 3rd Earl of Norwich and Baron Howard of Castle Rising, 18th Baron Strange of Blackmere, 15th Baron Talbot, 14th Baron Furnivall, 19th Baron Mowbray 1701–1732	Edward Howard (1685–1777); 9th Duke of Norfolk, 24th/17th/5th Earl of Arundel, 7th/9th Earl of Surrey, 4th Earl of Norwich and Baron Howard of Castle Rising, 20th Baron Mowbray, 20th Baron Strange of Blackmere, 15th Baron Talbot, 14th Baron Furnivall 1732–1777	Philip Howard (1688–1750)	Bernard Howard (1674–1735)
Earldom of Norwich (3rd creation) and Barony of Howard of Castle Rising extinct and Baronies of Furnivall, Mowbray, Segrave, Strange of Blackmere, and Talbot abeyant, 1777
Charles Stourton (1702–1753); 15th Baron Stourton	William Stourton (1704–1781); 16th Baron Stourton	Winifred Howard (1726–1753)	Anne Howard (1742–1787)	Charles Howard (1720–1786); 10th Duke of Norfolk, 25th/18th/6th Earl of Arundel, 8th/10th Earl of Surrey 1777–1786	Henry Howard (1713–1787)
Charles Philip Stourton (1752–1816); 17th Baron Stourton	Charles Howard (1746–1815); 11th Duke of Norfolk, 26th/19th/7th Earl of Arundel, 9th/11th Earl of Surrey 1786–1815
William Stourton (1776–1846); 18th Baron Stourton	Bernard Howard (1765–1842); 12th Duke of Norfolk, 27th/20th/8th Earl of Arundel, 10th/12th Earl of Surrey 1815–1842
Charles Stourton (1802–1872); 19th Baron Stourton	Henry Howard (1791–1856); 13th Duke of Norfolk, 28th/21st/9th Earl of Arundel, 11th/13th Earl of Surrey 1842–1856
Baron Mowbray and Baron Segrave abeayance restored, 1878	Baron Howard of Glossop
Alfred Joseph Stourton (1829–1893); 24th Baron Segrave, 21st/23rd Baron Mowbray, 20th Baron Stourton	Henry Granville Fitzalan-Howard (1815–1860); 14th Duke of Norfolk, 29th/22nd/10th Earl of Arundel, 12th/14th Earl of Surrey 1856–1860	Edward George Fitzalan-Howard (1818–1883); 1st Baron Howard of Glossop
Charles Botolph Joseph Stourton (1867–1936); 25th Baron Segrave, 22nd/24th Baron Mowbray, 21st Baron Stourton	Henry Fitzalan-Howard (1847–1917); 15th Duke of Norfolk, 30th/23rd/11th Earl of Arundel, 13th/15th Earl of Surrey, Lord Maltravers, Earl of Arundel and Surrey 1860–1917	Francis Fitzalan-Howard (1859–1924); 2nd Baron Howard of Glossop
William Marmaduke Stourton (1895–1965); 26th Baron Segrave, 23rd/25th Baron Mowbray, 22nd Baron Stourton	Bernard Fitzalan-Howard (1908–1975); 16th Duke of Norfolk, 31st/24th/12th Earl of Arundel, 14th/16th Earl of Surrey 1917–1975	Bernard Fitzalan-Howard (1885–1972); 3rd Baron Howard of Glossop
Charles Edward Stourton (1923–2006); 27th Baron Segrave, 24th/26th Baron Mowbray, 23rd Baron Stourton	Miles Fitzalan-Howard (1915–2002); 17th Duke of Norfolk, 32nd/25th/13th Earl of Arundel, 15th/17th Earl of Surrey, 4th Baron Howard of Glossop 1975–2002
Edward William Stephen Stourton (1953–2021); 28th Baron Segrave, 25th/27th Baron Mowbray, 24th Baron Stourton	Edward Fitzalan-Howard (b. 1956); 18th Duke of Norfolk, 33rd/26th/14th Earl of Arundel, 16th/18th Earl of Surrey, 5th Baron Howard of Glossop from 2002
James Charles Peter Stourton (b. 1991); 29th Baron Segrave, 26th/28th Baron Mowbray, 25th Baron Stourton	Henry Fitzalan-Howard (b. 1987) styled Earl of Arundel and Surrey

Parliament of the United Kingdom
Preceded by Lord Dudley Coutts Stuart	Member of Parliament for Arundel; 1837–1851	Succeeded by Edward Strutt
Preceded by John O'Connell	Member of Parliament for Limerick City; 1851–1852	Succeeded by Francis William Russell
Honorary titles
Preceded by The Duke of Norfolk	Earl Marshal; 1856–1860	Succeeded by The Duke of Norfolk
Peerage of England
Preceded by Henry Charles Howard	Duke of Norfolk; 1856–1860	Succeeded by Henry Fitzalan-Howard
