= William Stourton =

William Stourton may refer to:

- William Stourton (speaker), speaker of the English House of Commons, 1413
- William Stourton, 2nd Baron Stourton (c. 1430–1479), English peer
- William Stourton, 5th Baron Stourton (c. 1457–1523), English peer
- William Stourton, 7th Baron Stourton (c. 1505–1548), English peer
- William Stourton, 11th Baron Stourton (c. 1594–1672), English peer
- William Stourton, 12th Baron Stourton (died 1685), English peer
- William Stourton, 16th Baron Stourton (1704–1781), English peer
- William Stourton, 18th Baron Stourton (1776–1846), English peer
- William Stourton, 25th Baron Mowbray (1895–1965), English peer and soldier
