= Edward Stourton =

Edward Stourton may refer to:

- Edward Stourton, 6th Baron Stourton (1463–1535)
- Edward Stourton, 10th Baron Stourton (c. 1555–1633)
- Edward Stourton, 13th Baron Stourton (1665–1720)
- Edward Stourton, 27th Baron Mowbray (1953–2021), British peer
- Edward Stourton (journalist) (1957–2026), British broadcaster and journalist
