= Baron Howard =

Title in the Peerage of England

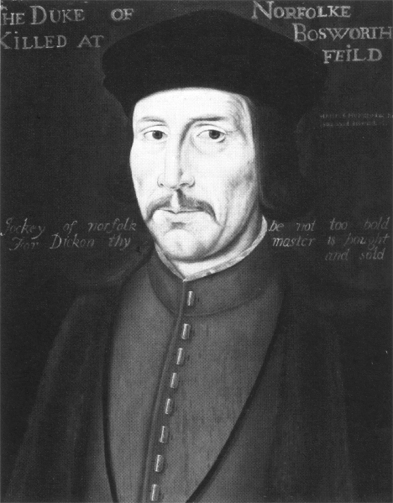

The title of Baron Howard was a title in the Peerage of England. On 15 October 1470 John Howard was summoned to parliament. In 1483 he was created Duke of Norfolk, and in 1485 he was attainted and his titles were forfeited. It is not clear if the barony of Howard was restored with the dukedom. If so, the barony would have fallen into abeyance in 1777.

== Barons Howard (1470) ==
- John Howard, 1st Baron Howard (1430–1485; forfeit 1485)
- For further barons see Duke of Norfolk and the House of Howard.

== See also ==
- Baron Howard of Castle Rising
- Baron Howard of Charlton
- Baron Howard of Effingham
- Baron Howard of Escrick
- Baron Howard of Glossop
- Baron Howard of Marnhull
- Baron Howard of Penrith
- Baron Howard de Walden
- George Howard, Baron Howard of Henderskelfe
- Greville Howard, Baron Howard of Rising
- Michael Howard, Baron Howard of Lympne
