= William Stourton, 16th Baron Stourton =

British peer

Arms of Stourton: Sable, a bend or between six fountains

William Stourton, 16th Baron Stourton (1704–1781) was a British peer. By his marriage to a co-heiress of the 8th and 9th Dukes of Norfolk, his descendant Alfred Stourton, 20th Baron Stourton (1829–1893) inherited in 1877 the ancient abeyant titles Baron Mowbray and Baron Segrave, with many others, created by writ and thus able to descend via female heirs.

== Biography ==
He was the younger son of Charles Stourton (1669–1739), third son of William Stourton, 12th Baron Stourton. He was the younger brother and heir of Charles Stourton, 15th Baron Stourton (1702–1753). William's mother was Katherine Frompton (died 1736). William was the second of five children, with one elder brother and three younger sisters; Mary (1706–1764), Jane (1708–1769) and Katherine (1710–1777). In 1753 William succeeded his elder brother Charles as the 16th Baron Stourton.

He was admitted to Gray's Inn in 1741.

== Marriage and issue ==
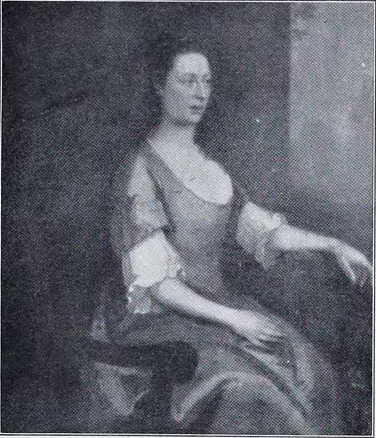
Winfrede Howard

On 11 October 1749 he married Winifred Howard (31 August 1726 – 15 July 1753), the eldest daughter and in her issue co-heiress of Philip Howard of Buckenham, Norfolk, and in her issue co-heiress of her uncles the 8th and 9th Dukes of Norfolk, to the titles Baron Mowbray, Baron Segrave, Baron Howard, Baron Greystoke, Baron Ferrers of Wemme, Baron Furnival, Baron Strange of Blackmere, Baron Giffard of Brimmesfield, Baron Braose of Gower, etc. By his wife he had one son and two daughters:

- Charles Philip Stourton, 17th Baron Stourton, son and heir.
- Catharine Stourton (16 August 1750 - 2 Sep 1768), a novice at Liege
- Charlotte-Mary Stourton (16 September 1751 - 15 July 1754), a novice at Liege

William Stourton died on 3 Oct 1781 and was buried at Witham, co. Essex.

== Notes ==
Peerage of England
Preceded by Charles Stourton	Baron Stourton; 1753–1781	Succeeded by Charles Philip Stourton
