= Charles Stourton, 24th Baron Mowbray =

Quartered arms of Stourton, Barons Mowbray: quarterly of six: *1st: Sable, a bend or between six fountains (Stourton); *2nd: Gules, on a bend between six cross-crosslets fitchy argent an escutcheon or charged with a demi-lion rampant pierced through the mouth by an arrow within a double tressure flory counterflory of the first (Howard); *3rd: Gules, a lion rampant argent (Mowbray); *4th: Sable, a lion rampant argent ducally crowned or (Segrave); *5th: Gules, three lions passant guardant in pale or armed and langued azure a label of three points argent (Plantagenet (Thomas of Brotherton, 1st Earl of Norfolk)); *6th Gules, a lion rampant within a bordure engrailed or (Talbot)

Charles Stourton, 21st Baron Stourton, 25th Baron Segrave, 24th Baron Mowbray (23 May 1867 – 29 July 1936) was the son of Alfred Joseph Stourton, 20th Baron Stourton, 24th Baron Segrave and 23rd Baron Mowbray and Mary Margaret Corbally, daughter of Matthew Corbally MP, of Corbalton Hall, County Meath, Ireland, and the Hon. Matilda Margaret Preston.

He married Mary Constable in 1893. They had four children:

- Hon Winifred Mary Stourton (21 Aug. 1894-2 Dec. 1904)
- William Marmaduke Stourton, 22nd Baron Stourton, 26th Baron Segrave and 25th Baron Mowbray (31 Aug 1895 – 7 May 1965)
- Maj. Hon. John Joseph Stourton (5 March 1899-2 Feb. 1992) married Kathleen Alice Gunther, and together they had two sons and two daughters.
- Hon Charlotte Mary Stourton (20 Jan 1904 – 4 June 2003)

He was something of an amateur historian with a particular interest in his own family's history. In 1899 he privately published History of the Noble Family of Stourton, which contains much useful information, though it possibly exaggerates the role his family played in English history.

Peerage of England
Preceded by Alfred Joseph Stourton	Baron Mowbray; Baron Segrave; Baron Stourton; 1893–1936	Succeeded by William Stourton
