= Baron Stourton =

Title in the Peerage of England

Arms of Stourton: Sable, a bend or between six fountains

Quartered arms of Stourton, Baron Mowbray, Segrave and Stourton: quarterly of six: *1st: Sable, a bend or between six fountains (Stourton); *2nd: Gules, on a bend between six cross-crosslets fitchy argent an escutcheon or charged with a demi-lion rampant pierced through the mouth by an arrow within a double tressure flory counterflory of the first (Howard); *3rd: Gules, a lion rampant argent (Mowbray); *4th: Sable, a lion rampant argent ducally crowned or (Segrave); *5th: Gules, three lions passant guardant in pale or armed and langued azure a label of three points argent (Plantagenet (Thomas of Brotherton, 1st Earl of Norfolk)); *6th Gules, a lion rampant within a bordure engrailed or (Talbot)

Baron Stourton is a title in the Peerage of England, It was created by patent in 1448 for John Stourton. In 1878, the ancient barony of Mowbray was called out of abeyance in favour of the twentieth Baron Stourton. About two weeks later, the barony of Segrave was also called out of abeyance in his favour. Thereafter, the three baronies remained united. The formal title is Baron Mowbray, Segrave and Stourton.

The family seat, until 1717, was Stourhead.

The motto of the family is "Loyal je serai durant ma vie" (French: I will be loyal throughout my life).

As well as the coat of arms, the Stourton family has a heraldic badge: A drag (or sledge) or.

== Barons Stourton (1448) ==
- John Stourton, 1st Baron Stourton (1400–1462)
- William Stourton, 2nd Baron Stourton (c. 1430 – 1478)
- John Stourton, 3rd Baron Stourton (c. 1454 – 1485)
- Francis Stourton, 4th Baron Stourton (1485–1487)
- William Stourton, 5th Baron Stourton (c. 1457 – 1523)
- Edward Stourton, 6th Baron Stourton (1463–1535)
- William Stourton, 7th Baron Stourton (c. 1505 – 1548)
- Charles Stourton, 8th Baron Stourton (c. 1520 – 1557)
- John Stourton, 9th Baron Stourton (1553–1588)
- Edward Stourton, 10th Baron Stourton (c. 1555 – 1633)
- William Stourton, 11th Baron Stourton (c. 1594 – 1672)
- William Stourton, 12th Baron Stourton (d. 1685)
- Edward Stourton, 13th Baron Stourton (1665–1720)
- Thomas Stourton, 14th Baron Stourton (1667–1744)
- Charles Stourton, 15th Baron Stourton (1702–1753)
- William Stourton, 16th Baron Stourton (1704–1781)
- Charles Philip Stourton, 17th Baron Stourton (1752–1816)
- William Stourton, 18th Baron Stourton (1776–1846)
- Charles Stourton, 19th Baron Stourton (1802–1872)
- Alfred Joseph Stourton, 20th Baron Stourton (1829–1893)
- Charles Botolph Joseph Stourton, 21st Baron Stourton (1867–1936)
- William Marmaduke Stourton, 22nd Baron Stourton (1895–1965)
- Charles Edward Stourton, 23rd Baron Stourton (1923–2006)
- Edward William Stephen Stourton, 24th Baron Stourton (1953–2021)
- James Charles Peter Stourton, 25th Baron Stourton (b. 1991)

== See also ==
- Vavasour baronets
