= Thomas Stourton, 14th Baron Stourton =

English Baron

Arms of Stourton: Sable, a bend or between six fountains

Thomas Stourton, 14th Baron Stourton (1667–1744) was a younger son of William Stourton.

Thomas succeeded his brother Edward in 1720. As Thomas died without children, he was succeeded by his nephew Charles in 1744.

Peerage of England
Preceded by Edward Stourton	Baron Stourton; 1720–1744	Succeeded by Charles Stourton
