= Alfred Stourton, 23rd Baron Mowbray =

Arms of Stourton: Sable, a bend or between six fountains

Quartered arms of Stourton, Barons Mowbray: quarterly of six: *1st: Sable, a bend or between six fountains (Stourton); *2nd: Gules, on a bend between six cross-crosslets fitchy argent an escutcheon or charged with a demi-lion rampant pierced through the mouth by an arrow within a double tressure flory counterflory of the first (Howard); *3rd: Gules, a lion rampant argent (Mowbray); *4th: Sable, a lion rampant argent ducally crowned or (Segrave); *5th: Gules, three lions passant guardant in pale or armed and langued azure a label of three points argent (Plantagenet (Thomas of Brotherton, 1st Earl of Norfolk)); *6th Gules, a lion rampant within a bordure engrailed or (Talbot)

Alfred Joseph Stourton, 20th Baron Stourton, 24th Baron Segrave, 23rd Baron Mowbray (28 February 1829 – 18 April 1893) was the son of the nineteenth Baron Stourton and Mary Lucy Clifford, daughter of the 6th Baron Clifford of Chudleigh and his wife Eleanor Mary Arundell.

By virtue of being descended from a co-heiress of the baronies of Mowbray and Segrave, Alfred had these baronies called out of abeyance in 1878.

He married Mary Margaret Corbally in 1865. She was the only child of the Irish politician Matthew Corbally MP of Corbalton Hall, County Meath and the Hon. Matilda Margaret Preston, daughter of the 12th Viscount Gormanston. They had ten children:

- Hon. Charles Stourton (1867–1936); inherited his father's titles in 1893.
- Hon. Mary Lucy Agnes Stourton (1868–1950); married to Cecil Henry Maxwell-Lyte
- Hon. Edith Matilda Mary Stourton (1870–1924); unmarried
- Hon. Hilda Mary Stourton (1871–1958); unmarried
- Major Hon. Alfred Edward Corbally Joseph Stourton (1872–1926); Second Boer War veteran
- Hon. Alison Mary Stourton (1874–1957); unmarried
- Hon. Ethel Mary Josephine Stourton (1876–1948); unmarried
- Hon. Nigel Roger Plantagenet Joseph Stourton (1879–1908); married Florence Piggott, no issue
- Hon. Edward Plantagenet Joseph Corbally Stourton (1880–1966); married Beatrice Page, 2 children
- Hon. Matilda Margaret Mary Josephine Stourton (1884–1975); married Lt.-Col. Herbert Alexander Graf (Count) von Metzsch-Reichenbach of the Kingdom of Saxony

== Notes ==
Peerage of England
Vacant Abeyant Title last held by Edward Howard	Baron Mowbray; Baron Segrave; 1878–1893	Succeeded by Charles Stourton
Preceded by William Stourton	Baron Stourton; 1872–1893	Succeeded by Charles Stourton
