= Charles Stourton, 15th Baron Stourton =

Arms of Stourton: Sable, a bend or between six fountains

Charles Stourton, 15th Baron Stourton (2 March 1702 – 11 March 1753) was the son of Charles Stourton (1669–1739), himself the third son of William Stourton, 12th Baron Stourton. Charles' mother was Katherine Frompton (died 1736). Charles was the eldest of five children, with one brother and sisters; Mary (1706–1764), Jane (1708–1769) and Katherine (1710–1777).

Charles succeeded his childless uncle Thomas in 1744 and was succeeded by his brother William in 1753.

He married Catherine Walmesley (1697 – 31 January 1785), widow of Robert Petre, 7th Baron Petre, on 2 April 1733. They had no children.

Peerage of England
Preceded by Thomas Stourton	Baron Stourton; 1744–1753	Succeeded by William Stourton
