= Charles Stourton, 19th Baron Stourton =

English noble (1802–1872)

Arms of Stourton: Sable, a bend or between six fountains

Charles Stourton, 19th Baron Stourton (1802–1872) was the son of William Stourton, 18th Baron Stourton and Catherine Weld, daughter of Thomas Weld. He succeeded to the title on his father's death in 1846.

The nineteenth Baron married Mary Lucy Clifford, daughter of Charles Clifford, 6th Baron Clifford of Chudleigh and Eleanor Mary Arundell, daughter of Henry Arundell, 8th Baron Arundell of Wardour, in 1825. They had the following issue:

- William Stourton (1826-1838), died young;
- Alfred Joseph, who became 20th Baron Stourton in 1872, 23rd Baron Mowbray in 1878, and 24th Baron Segrave in 1878;
- Capt. Everard Stourton (1834-1869), married Hon. Fernina Bellew (daughter of Patrick Bellew, 1st Baron Bellew), had issue;
- Albert Stourton (1835-1902), married Elizabeth Throckmorton (daughter of Robert Throckmorton, 8th Baronet Throckmorton), had issue.

His descendants include the journalist Edward Stourton.

Peerage of England
Preceded by William Stourton	Baron Stourton; 1846–1872	Succeeded by Alfred Joseph Stourton
