= John Stourton, 3rd Baron Stourton =

Arms of Stourton: Sable, a bend or between six fountains

John Stourton, 3rd Baron Stourton (c. 1454 – 1485) was the eldest son and successor of the second Baron Stourton, and his wife Margaret Chidiock.

He married Katherine Berkeley, daughter of Sir Maurice Berkeley of Beverstone Castle, Gloucestershire and Anne West, daughter of Reginald West, 6th Baron De La Warr. They had a son, Francis and a daughter, Anne, who died unmarried. He was knighted in 1475, and succeeded to his father's titles in 1479.

His brother-in-law, Sir William Berkeley, was a leading member of Buckingham's revolt in 1483, and was attainted as a traitor by the Parliament of 1484. Richard III was prepared to pardon Berkeley on condition that Stourton, who retained the King's confidence, and had sat in the Parliament which passed the attainder, enter a bond for 1000 marks as surety for Berkeley's good behaviour. Shortly afterwards Berkeley fled the country to join Henry VII and Stourton was obliged to find the money to pay the bond. The triumph of Henry VII in 1485 might have brought him some rewards (although Henry was not as a rule overly generous to his supporters), but both Stourton and Berkeley died in the first months of the new reign.

John was succeeded by his son Francis in 1485; Francis died in infancy. His widow remarried Sir John Brereton, and had one surviving daughter Werburga. Werburga married firstly Sir Francis Cheyne and secondly Sir William Compton, by whom she had three children.

Peerage of England
Preceded by William Stourton	Baron Stourton; 1479–1485	Succeeded by Francis Stourton
