= Edward Stourton, 27th Baron Mowbray =

British peer (1953–2021)

The Right Honourable The Lord Mowbray
- Predecessor: 26th Baron Mowbray
- Born: Edward William Stephen Stourton; 17 April 1953
- Died: 30 January 2021 (aged 67)
- Spouse: Penelope Lucy Brunet
- Issue: Isabella Laura Stourton; Camilla Charlotte Stourton; Francesca Jane Stourton; James Charles Peter Stourton
- Parents: Charles Stourton, 26th Baron Mowbray; Jane Faith de Yarburgh-Bateson

Edward William Stephen Stourton, 27th Baron Mowbray, 28th Baron Segrave, 24th Baron Stourton (17 April 1953 – 30 January 2021) was a British peer.

== Biography ==
He was the son of Charles Stourton, 23rd Baron Stourton, 27th Baron Segrave and 26th Baron Mowbray and wife the Hon. Jane Faith de Yarburgh-Bateson, daughter of Stephen de Yarburgh-Bateson, 5th Baron Deramore.

He was educated at Ampleforth College. He inherited his father's titles on 12 December 2006.

On 12 July 1980, he married Penelope Lucy Brunet (now Lady Mowbray) at the Oxford Oratory, a Catholic church in Oxford.

They had five children:

- Hon. Sarah Louise Stourton (born 28 February 1982); married in 2011 Harry Aubrey-Fletcher (born 1982), youngest son of Sir Henry Aubrey-Fletcher, 8th Baronet.
- Hon. Isabella Laura Stourton (born 1983)
- Hon. Camilla Charlotte Stourton (born 1987)
- Hon. Francesca Jane Stourton (born 1988)
- James Charles Peter Stourton (born 12 December 1991), 28th Baron Mowbray, 29th Baron Segrave, 25th Baron Stourton.

Lady Mowbray organised the annual Allerton Park Horse Trials on the estate.

Lord Mowbray died in January 2021 following a fall at his home. He was 67 years old.

Peerage of England
Preceded by Charles Stourton	Baron Mowbray; Baron Segrave; Baron Stourton; 2006–2021	Succeeded by James Stourton
