= Francis Stourton, 4th Baron Stourton =

Arms of Stourton: Sable, a bend or between six fountains

Francis Stourton, 4th Baron Stourton (1485–1487) was the son and successor of the third Baron Stourton. His mother was Katherine Berkeley, daughter of Sir Maurice Berkeley.

He died at approximately 2 years, and was succeeded by his uncle William, a younger son of the second Baron Stourton and his wife Margaret Chidiock.

Peerage of England
Preceded by John Stourton	Baron Stourton; 1485–1487	Succeeded by William Stourton
