= William Stourton, 25th Baron Mowbray =

English baron (1895–1965)

Quartered arms of Stourton, Barons Mowbray: quarterly of six: *1st: Sable, a bend or between six fountains (Stourton); *2nd: Gules, on a bend between six cross-crosslets fitchy argent an escutcheon or charged with a demi-lion rampant pierced through the mouth by an arrow within a double tressure flory counterflory of the first (Howard); *3rd: Gules, a lion rampant argent (Mowbray); *4th: Sable, a lion rampant argent ducally crowned or (Segrave); *5th: Gules, three lions passant guardant in pale or armed and langued azure a label of three points argent (Plantagenet (Thomas of Brotherton, 1st Earl of Norfolk)); *6th Gules, a lion rampant within a bordure engrailed or (Talbot)

William Stourton, 22nd Baron Stourton, 26th Baron Segrave, 25th Baron Mowbray (31 August 1895 – 7 May 1965) was a British peer and the son of Charles Stourton, 21st Baron Stourton, 25th Baron Segrave and 24th Baron Mowbray and Mary Constable.

He was a captain in the Grenadier Guards, and married Sheila Gully, granddaughter of William Gully, 1st Viscount Selby, in 1921. They had two children:

- Charles Edward Stourton, 23rd Baron Stourton, 27th Baron Segrave and 26th Baron Mowbray (born 11 March 1923, died 12 December 2006)
- Hon Patricia Winifred Mary Stourton (born 2 November 1924) who married Frederick Crowder.

== Notes ==
Peerage of England
| Preceded by Charles Stourton | Baron Mowbray; Baron Segrave; Baron Stourton; 1936–1965 | Succeeded by Charles Stourton |
