= William Stourton, 12th Baron Stourton =

Arms of Stourton: Sable, a bend or between six fountains

William Stourton, 12th Baron Stourton (died 1685) was the grandson and successor of William Stourton. He was the son of Edward Stourton and Mary Petre, daughter of the 3rd Baron Petre. He died on August 7, 1685 in Stourton, Wiltshire, England.

Although taking his seat in Parliament in 1673, the Test Act of 1678 meant that he was excluded from the House of Lords after only five years for being Roman Catholic. His successors were also excluded, until the passing of the Catholic Emancipation Act in 1829.

He married Elizabeth Preston (died April 1688), daughter of Sir John Preston, in 1665. The couple had at least six sons, two of whom died as infants.

- Edward (1665–1720), became Baron in 1685.
- Thomas (1666-1667)
- Thomas (1667–1743), became Baron in 1720.
- William (1668-1669)
- Capt. Charles Stourton (1669-18 Sept 1739), father of:
  - Charles Stourton, who became Baron in 1743.
  - William Stourton, who became Baron in 1754.
- John Stourton (1673-3 October 1748)

Peerage of England
Preceded by William Stourton	Baron Stourton; 1672–1685	Succeeded by Edward Stourton
