= Edward Stourton, 13th Baron Stourton =

Arms of Stourton: Sable, a bend or between six fountains

Edward Stourton, 13th Baron Stourton (1665–1720) was the eldest son of William Stourton.

He succeeded his father in 1685. Since the thirteenth Baron had no children, he was succeeded by his younger brother Thomas in 1720.

Peerage of England
Preceded by William Stourton	Baron Stourton; 1685–1720	Succeeded by Thomas Stourton
