= William Stourton, 5th Baron Stourton =

Arms of Stourton: Sable, a bend or between six fountains

William Stourton, 5th Baron Stourton (c. 1457 – 1523) was a younger son of the second Baron Stourton.

He succeeded his nephew Francis in 1487. Having no children of his own from his marriage to Katherine de la Pole (c. 1477 – 1513), daughter of John de la Pole, 2nd Duke of Suffolk and his wife Elizabeth of York, the fifth Baron was succeeded by a younger brother Edward in 1523.

William Stourton, 5th Baron Stourton was born in 1457. He was the son of William Stourton, 2nd Baron Stourton and Margaret Chideocke. He married, secondly, Thomasine Wrottesley, daughter of Sir Walter Wrottesley and Jane Baron. He died on 17 February 1523, without issue. He was buried at Stourton, Wiltshire, England. He succeeded to the title of 5th Baron Stourton, of Stourton, on 27 February 1486.

Peerage of England
Preceded by Francis Stourton	Baron Stourton; 1487–1523	Succeeded by Edward Stourton
