= William Stourton, 11th Baron Stourton =

Arms of Stourton: Sable, a bend or between six fountains

William Stourton, 11th Baron Stourton (c. 1594 – 25 April 1672) was the son of Edward Stourton and Frances Tresham. He married Frances More (d. 5 January 1662), daughter of Sir Edward More. William and Frances had five children;

- William
- Mary (d. 1650); married Sir John Weld
- Frances; was a nun
- Edward (1617 – January 1644); married and had issue
- Thomas (d. 1684, in Paris); was a monk

His eldest son William died young and childless, and he was succeeded by his grandson William, son of Edward.

William was a Cavalier and a Catholic, and suffered heavily due to this. Stourhead, his home, was at one point garrisoned for the King and then, in September 1644, was ravaged by General Ludlow.

Peerage of England
Preceded by Edward Stourton	Baron Stourton; 1633–1672	Succeeded by William Stourton
