= Earl of Norfolk =

English noble title

Earl of Norfolk is a title which has been created several times in the Peerage of England. Created in 1070, the first major dynasty to hold the title was the 12th and 13th century Bigod family, and it then was later held by the Mowbrays, who were also made Dukes of Norfolk. Due to the Bigods' descent in the female line from William Marshal, they inherited the hereditary office of Earl Marshal, still held by the Dukes of Norfolk today. The present title was created in 1644 for Thomas Howard, 18th Earl of Arundel, the heir of the Howard Dukedom of Norfolk which had been forfeit in 1572. Arundel's grandson, the 20th Earl of Arundel and 3rd Earl of Norfolk, was restored to the Dukedom as 5th Duke upon the Restoration in 1660, and the title continues to be borne by the Dukes of Norfolk.

== Earls of Norfolk (and Suffolk), first creation (1066/67) ==
- Ralph the Staller, 1st Earl of Norfolk and Suffolk (c. 1011–1068)
- Ralph de Guader, 2nd Earl of Norfolk and Suffolk (c. 1040 – c. 1096) (forfeit 1075)

== Earls of Norfolk, second creation (1141) ==
- Hugh Bigod, 1st Earl of Norfolk (1095–1177)
- Roger Bigod, 2nd Earl of Norfolk (died 1221)
- Hugh Bigod, 3rd Earl of Norfolk (died 1225)
- Roger Bigod, 4th Earl of Norfolk (died 1270)
- Roger Bigod, 5th Earl of Norfolk (died 1306)

== Earls of Norfolk, third creation (1312) ==
- Thomas of Brotherton, 1st Earl of Norfolk (died 1338)
- Margaret, Duchess of Norfolk, 2nd Countess of Norfolk (died 1399)
- Thomas de Mowbray, 1st Duke of Norfolk, 3rd Earl of Norfolk (1365–1399) (dukedom forfeit 1399)
- Thomas de Mowbray, 4th Earl of Norfolk (1385–1405)
- John de Mowbray, 2nd Duke of Norfolk (1392–1432) (dukedom restored 1425)
- John de Mowbray, 3rd Duke of Norfolk (1415–1461)
- John de Mowbray, 4th Duke of Norfolk (1444–1476) (dukedom abeyant 1476)
- Anne de Mowbray, 8th Countess of Norfolk (1472–1481)

== Earls of Norfolk, fourth creation (1477) ==
- Richard, Duke of York (1473–1483)

== Earls of Norfolk, fifth creation (1644) ==
- Thomas Howard, 1st Earl of Norfolk (1585–1646)
- Henry Frederick Howard, 2nd Earl of Norfolk (1608–1652)
- Thomas Howard, 5th Duke of Norfolk (dukedom restored 1660)

For later Earls of Norfolk, see Duke of Norfolk.

== Family tree ==
Family tree of the Dukes of Norfolk; Earls of Arundel, East Anglia, Norfolk, Norwich, Nottingham, and Surrey; and Barons Mowbray, Segrave and Stourton

Roger Bigod of Norfolk
Earl of East Anglia (Earls of Norfolk and Suffolk) (1st creation), before 1069	Earl of Norfolk (2nd creation), 1141
Ralph the Staller (c. 1011–1068); 1st Earl of Norfolk and Suffolk, or of the East Angles c. 1066/67–1068	Maud Bigod	Hugh Bigod (1095–1177); 1st Earl of Norfolk 1141–1177
Ralph de Gael (c. 1040 – c. 1096); 2nd Earl of Norfolk and Suffolk, or of the East Angles until 1074	William d'Aubigny, 1st Earl of Arundel	Roger Bigod (c. 1144/1150–1221); 2nd Earl of Norfolk 1189–1221 (disputed 1177–1189)
Earldom forfeit, 1074
William d'Aubigny, 2nd Earl of Arundel	Hugh Bigod (1186–1225); 3rd Earl of Norfolk 1221–1225
William d'Aubigny, 3rd Earl of Arundel	Roger Bigod (c. 1209–1270); 4th Earl of Norfolk 1233–1270	Hugh Bigod (c. 1211–1266)
Isabel d'Aubigny	Roger Bigod (c. 1245–1306); 5th Earl of Norfolk 1270–1306
Baron Segrave of Se(a)grave, 1283	Earldom extinct, 1270
Nicholas Segrave (c. 1238–bef. 1295); 1st Baron Segrave	John Fitzalan (1223-1267)
Baron Mowbray, 1283
John Segrave (c. 1256–1325); 2nd Baron Segrave	King Edward I (1239–1307)	Roger de Mowbray (1254–1297); 1st Baron Mowbray	John Fitzalan (1246-1272)
Earl of Norfolk (3rd creation), 1312	Richard Fitzalan, 1st Earl of Arundel
Stephen Segrave (d. 1325); 3rd Baron Segrave	Thomas of Brotherton (1300–1338); 1st Earl of Norfolk 1312–1338	John Mowbray (1286–1322); 2nd Baron Mowbray
Edmund Fitzalan, 2nd Earl of Arundel
John Segrave (1315–1353); 4th Baron Segrave	Margaret of Brotherton (1320–1399); 2nd Countess of Norfolk 1338–1399, Duchess of Norfolk "for life" 1397–1399	John Mowbray (1310–1361); 3rd Baron Mowbray
Richard FitzAlan, 10th Earl of Arundel
Elizabeth de Segrave (1338–1368); 5th Baroness Segrave	John de Mowbray (1340–1368); 4th Baron Mowbray
Richard FitzAlan, 11th Earl of Arundel
Earl of Nottingham (1st creation), 1377	Earl of Nottingham (2nd creation), 1383; Duke of Norfolk (1st creation), 1397
John de Mowbray (1365–1383); 1st Earl of Nottingham, 6th Baron Segrave, 5th Baron Mowbray	Thomas de Mowbray (1366–1399); 1st Duke of Norfolk 1397–1399, 3rd Earl of Norfolk 1399, 7th Baron Segrave, 6th Baron Mowbray	Elizabeth FitzAlan, Duchess of Norfolk
Earldom of Nottingham extinct, 1383	Titles forfeit, 1399
Baron Stourton, 1448	Duke of Norfolk (1st creation restored), 1425
John Stourton (1400–1462); 1st Baron Stourton, 1448–1462	Thomas de Mowbray (1385–1405); 4th Earl of Norfolk, 8th Baron Segrave, 7th Baron Mowbray 1399–1405	John de Mowbray (1392–1432); 2nd Duke of Norfolk 1425–1432, 5th Earl of Norfolk, 9th Baron Segrave, 8th Baron Mowbray 1405–1432	Margaret de Mowbray (c. 1388–1459)	Robert Howard (1385–1436)	Isabel de Mowbray (c. 1400–1452)	James Berkeley, 1st Baron Berkeley (c. 1394–1463)
Duke of Norfolk (4th creation), 1483
William Stourton (before 1426–1478); 2nd Baron Stourton, 1462–1478	John de Mowbray (1415–1461); 3rd Duke of Norfolk, 6th Earl of Norfolk, 10th Baron Segrave, 9th Baron Mowbray 1432–1461	John Howard (1425–1485); 1st Duke of Norfolk, 13th Baron Segrave, 12th Baron Mowbray 1483–1485
Titles forfeit, 1485
Earl of Surrey (2nd creation), 1451	Duke of Norfolk (4th creation) restored and Earl of Surrey, 1514
John Stourton (c. 1454–1485); 3rd Baron Stourton, 1479–1485	William Stourton (c. 1457–1524); 5th Baron Stourton, 1487–1524	John de Mowbray (1444–1476); 4th Duke of Norfolk, 7th Earl of Norfolk, Earl of Surrey, 11th Baron Segrave, 10th Baron Mowbray 1461–1476	King Edward IV (1442–1483)	Thomas Howard (1443–1524); 2nd Duke of Norfolk, 1st Earl of Surrey 1514–1524
Dukedom of Norfolk, Earldom of Nottingham, Earldom of Surrey extinct, 1476
Duke of Norfolk (3rd creation), Earl of Nottingham (3rd creation), and Earl of Surrey, 1477
Francis Stourton (1485–1487); 4th Baron Stourton, 1485–1487	Edward Stourton (1463–1535); 6th Baron Stourton, 1524–1535	Anne de Mowbray (1472–1481); 8th Countess of Norfolk, 12th Baroness Segrave, 11th Baroness Mowbray 1476–1481	Richard of Shrewsbury (1473–1483); Duke of York, Duke of Norfolk, Earl of Nottingham, Earl of Warenne 1477–1483	Anne of York (1475–1511)	Thomas Howard (1473–1554); 3rd Duke of Norfolk, 2nd Earl of Surrey 1524–1554	Edmund Howard (c. 1478–1539)	Elizabeth Boleyn (c. 1480–1538)
Earldom of Norfolk extinct and Baronies Segrave and Mowbray in abeyance, 1481	Dukedom of Norfolk, Earldom of Nottingham, Earldom of Surrey extinct, 1483	Attainted, 1547; Restored, 1553
William Stourton (c. 1505–1548); 7th Baron Stourton	Earl of Nottingham (5th creation), 1525	King Henry VIII (1491–1547)	Anne Boleyn (c. 1501 or 1507–1536)
Charles Stourton (c. 1520–1557); 8th Baron Stourton	Henry Howard (1517–1547) styled Earl of Surrey	Thomas Howard (c. 1520–1582); Viscount Howard of Bindon	Mary FitzRoy (1519–1557)	Henry FitzRoy (1519–1536); Duke of Richmond and Somerset, Earl of Nottingham	Catherine Howard (c. 1524–1542)
Earldom of Nottingham extinct, 1536
Thomas Howard (1536–1572); 4th Duke of Norfolk, 3rd Earl of Surrey, 13th Baron Mowbray 1554–1572	Henry Howard (1540–1614); Earl of Northampton	Queen Elizabeth I (1533–1603)
Dukedom (3rd creation) forfeit, 1572
Earl of Arundel (3rd creation), 1580	Earl of Suffolk (4th creation), 1603
John Stourton (1553–1588); 9th Baron Stourton	Edward Stourton (c. 1555–1633); 10th Baron Stourton	Philip Howard (1557–1595); 20th/13th/1st Earl of Arundel, styled Earl of Surrey	Thomas Howard (1561–1626); Earl of Suffolk	Lord William Howard (1563–1640)
Earldom of Arundel and Barony of Mowbray attainted, 1589	see Earls, Marquesses, and Dukes of Suffolk family tree
Earl of Arundel (3rd creation) and Barony of Mowbray restored, 1604; Earl of Norfolk (5th creation), 1644
William Stourton (c. 1594–1672); 11th Baron Stourton	Thomas Howard (1585–1646); 21st/14th/2nd Earl of Arundel, 2nd/4th Earl of Surrey, 1st Earl of Norfolk, 14th Baron Mowbray 1644–1646
see Earls of Shrewsbury family tree
Edward Stourton (1617–1644)	Henry Frederick Howard (1608–1652); 22nd/15th/3rd Earl of Arundel, 3rd/5th Earl of Surrey, 2nd Earl of Norfolk, 15th Baron Mowbray 1646–1652	Alethea Howard; 1585–1654; 17th Baroness Strange of Blackmere, 14th Baroness Talbot, 13th Baroness Furnivall
Duke of Norfolk (4th creation restored), 1660	Baron Howard of Castle Rising, 1669; Earl of Norwich (3rd creation), 1672
William Stourton (d. 1685); 12th Baron Stourton	Thomas Howard (1627–1677); 5th Duke of Norfolk, 21st/14th/2nd Earl of Arundel, 4th/6th Earl of Surrey, 16th Baron Mowbray 1660–1677; 18th Baron Strange of Blackmere, 15th Baron Talbot, 14th Baron Furnivall 1654–1677	Henry Howard (1628–1684); 6th Duke of Norfolk, 22nd/15th/3rd Earl of Arundel, 5th/7th Earl of Surrey, 1st Earl of Norwich and Baron Howard of Castle Rising, 18th Baron Strange of Blackmere, 17th Baron Mowbray, 15th Baron Talbot, 14th Baron Furnivall 1672–1684	Hon. Charles Howard (1630–1713)	Col. Bernard Howard (1641–1717)
Edward Stourton (1665–1720); 13th Baron Stourton	Thomas Stourton (1667–1744); 14th Baron Stourton	Charles Stourton (1669–1739)	Henry Howard (1655–1701); 7th Duke of Norfolk, 22nd/15th/3rd Earl of Arundel, 5th/7th Earl of Surrey, 2nd Earl of Norwich and Baron Howard of Castle Rising, 18th Baron Mowbray, 19th Baron Strange of Blackmere, 15th Baron Talbot, 14th Baron Furnivall, 1684–1701	Lord Thomas Howard (1662–1689)	Henry Charles Howard (d. 1720)
Thomas Howard (1683–1732); 8th Duke of Norfolk, 23rd/16th/4th Earl of Arundel, 6th/8th Earl of Surrey, 3rd Earl of Norwich and Baron Howard of Castle Rising, 18th Baron Strange of Blackmere, 15th Baron Talbot, 14th Baron Furnivall, 19th Baron Mowbray 1701–1732	Edward Howard (1685–1777); 9th Duke of Norfolk, 24th/17th/5th Earl of Arundel, 7th/9th Earl of Surrey, 4th Earl of Norwich and Baron Howard of Castle Rising, 20th Baron Mowbray, 20th Baron Strange of Blackmere, 15th Baron Talbot, 14th Baron Furnivall 1732–1777	Philip Howard (1688–1750)	Bernard Howard (1674–1735)
Earldom of Norwich (3rd creation) and Barony of Howard of Castle Rising extinct and Baronies of Furnivall, Mowbray, Segrave, Strange of Blackmere, and Talbot abeyant, 1777
Charles Stourton (1702–1753); 15th Baron Stourton	William Stourton (1704–1781); 16th Baron Stourton	Winifred Howard (1726–1753)	Anne Howard (1742–1787)	Charles Howard (1720–1786); 10th Duke of Norfolk, 25th/18th/6th Earl of Arundel, 8th/10th Earl of Surrey 1777–1786	Henry Howard (1713–1787)
Charles Philip Stourton (1752–1816); 17th Baron Stourton	Charles Howard (1746–1815); 11th Duke of Norfolk, 26th/19th/7th Earl of Arundel, 9th/11th Earl of Surrey 1786–1815
William Stourton (1776–1846); 18th Baron Stourton	Bernard Howard (1765–1842); 12th Duke of Norfolk, 27th/20th/8th Earl of Arundel, 10th/12th Earl of Surrey 1815–1842
Charles Stourton (1802–1872); 19th Baron Stourton	Henry Howard (1791–1856); 13th Duke of Norfolk, 28th/21st/9th Earl of Arundel, 11th/13th Earl of Surrey 1842–1856
Baron Mowbray and Baron Segrave abeayance restored, 1878	Baron Howard of Glossop
Alfred Joseph Stourton (1829–1893); 24th Baron Segrave, 21st/23rd Baron Mowbray, 20th Baron Stourton	Henry Granville Fitzalan-Howard (1815–1860); 14th Duke of Norfolk, 29th/22nd/10th Earl of Arundel, 12th/14th Earl of Surrey 1856–1860	Edward George Fitzalan-Howard (1818–1883); 1st Baron Howard of Glossop
Charles Botolph Joseph Stourton (1867–1936); 25th Baron Segrave, 22nd/24th Baron Mowbray, 21st Baron Stourton	Henry Fitzalan-Howard (1847–1917); 15th Duke of Norfolk, 30th/23rd/11th Earl of Arundel, 13th/15th Earl of Surrey, Lord Maltravers, Earl of Arundel and Surrey 1860–1917	Francis Fitzalan-Howard (1859–1924); 2nd Baron Howard of Glossop
William Marmaduke Stourton (1895–1965); 26th Baron Segrave, 23rd/25th Baron Mowbray, 22nd Baron Stourton	Bernard Fitzalan-Howard (1908–1975); 16th Duke of Norfolk, 31st/24th/12th Earl of Arundel, 14th/16th Earl of Surrey 1917–1975	Bernard Fitzalan-Howard (1885–1972); 3rd Baron Howard of Glossop
Charles Edward Stourton (1923–2006); 27th Baron Segrave, 24th/26th Baron Mowbray, 23rd Baron Stourton	Miles Fitzalan-Howard (1915–2002); 17th Duke of Norfolk, 32nd/25th/13th Earl of Arundel, 15th/17th Earl of Surrey, 4th Baron Howard of Glossop 1975–2002
Edward William Stephen Stourton (1953–2021); 28th Baron Segrave, 25th/27th Baron Mowbray, 24th Baron Stourton	Edward Fitzalan-Howard (b. 1956); 18th Duke of Norfolk, 33rd/26th/14th Earl of Arundel, 16th/18th Earl of Surrey, 5th Baron Howard of Glossop from 2002
James Charles Peter Stourton (b. 1991); 29th Baron Segrave, 26th/28th Baron Mowbray, 25th Baron Stourton	Henry Fitzalan-Howard (b. 1987) styled Earl of Arundel and Surrey
