= John Segrave =

John Segrave may refer to:

- John Segrave, 4th Baron Segrave, English peer and landowner
- John Segrave, 2nd Baron Segrave, English commander in the First War of Scottish Independence
