= Eleanor de Mowbray =

English noble

Eleanor de Mowbray (before 1361 – before 13 August 1417) was the daughter of John de Mowbray, 4th Baron Mowbray, and Elizabeth de Segrave, 5th Baroness Segrave (born 25 October 1338), daughter and heiress of John de Segrave, 4th Baron Segrave. She had two brothers and two sisters:

- John de Mowbray, 1st Earl of Nottingham, who died unmarried shortly before 12 February 1383 and was buried at the Whitefriars, London.
- Thomas de Mowbray, 1st Duke of Norfolk.
- Margaret Mowbray (d. before 11 July 1401), who married, by licence dated 1 July 1369, Sir Reginald Lucy (d. 9 November 1437) of Woodcroft in Luton, Bedfordshire.
- Joan Mowbray, who married firstly Sir Thomas Grey (1359 – 26 November or 3 December 1400) of Heaton near Norham, Northumberland, son of the chronicler Sir Thomas Grey, and secondly Sir Thomas Tunstall of Thurland in Tunstall, Lancashire.

Eleanor de Mowbray's father, the 4th Baron, was slain by the Turks at Thrace on 17 June 1368.

She died before 13 August 1417, when her husband, John Welles, 5th Baron Welles, married a second wife named Margaret (d. 8 April 1426), whose surname is unknown.

== Marriage and issue ==
Before 1386 she married John de Welles, 5th Baron Welles (d. 8 April 1426), son of John de Welles, 4th Baron Welles (d. 11 October 1361), and Maud de Roos (d. 9 December 1388), daughter of William de Roos, 2nd Baron Roos of Helmsley, by Margery de Badlesmere, by whom she had a son and two daughters:

- Eude de Welles, who predeceased his father.
- Eleanor.out
- Joan (d. 1409 in Cherwelton, Northamptonshire, England).
