= William Welles =

English statesman and judge in Ireland

Sir William Welles (1409/10 – 1461) was an English-born statesman and judge in fifteenth-century Ireland, who held the office of Lord Chancellor of Ireland. He was the younger brother of Lionel de Welles, 6th Baron Welles. Lionel was a prominent supporter of the House of Lancaster, who was killed at the Battle of Towton on 29 March 1461.

== Background ==
William was born in about 1409 or 1410, the second son of Eudo de Welles and Maud de Greystoke. His paternal grandparents were John de Welles, 5th Baron Welles and Eleanor de Mowbray. Eudo died before his father, and William's brother Lionel succeeded his grandfather as the sixth baron in 1421.

== Career ==
Lionel was appointed Lord Lieutenant of Ireland about 1438, and William accompanied him to Ireland, where he acted as his brother's deputy; he was appointed Deputy Lord Chancellor in 1454 and Lord Chancellor of Ireland in 1461. Unlike his brother he does not seem to have been particularly active on behalf of Henry VI, and despite Lionel's death, and the family's strong links to the House of Lancaster, he was still in office a year after the Battle of Towton, which brought about the final downfall of Henry VI. This suggests that the victorious King Edward IV, who was generally magnanimous towards his former opponents, provided that they were prepared to give their loyalty to him, took no action against him. He was killed at the Battle of Towton on 29 March 1461. His main residence was at Posseckstown, near Enfield, County Meath.

== Prior Thomas Fitzgerald ==
The 1440s were an especially turbulent period for the Anglo-Irish government of Ireland, marked by bitter feuds and faction fighting, and it was almost impossible for any Irish public official to stand aside from these quarrels. Welles became drawn into a private war with Thomas Fitzgerald, the turbulent and litigious Prior of the Knights Hospitallers, whose Irish house was at Kilmainham. In 1441 William's brother Lionel charged the Prior with being an accessory to the ambush and kidnapping of William at Kilcock, County Kildare: the Prior was not accused of being a direct party to the crime, but two of his brothers were. Lionel, as Lord Lieutenant, demanded that the Prior be prosecuted and that all the Hospitallers' Irish possessions be seized, but Fitzgerald produced a royal pardon. William, who was still a prisoner, eventually secured his release after meeting certain demands of the Fitzgeralds. Lionel resigned in disgust the following year and returned to England. Fitzgerald was removed from office in 1447, not on account of his treatment of Welles but because of his bitter feud with the powerful Irish magnate James Butler, 4th Earl of Ormonde.

== Family ==
William married Anne Barnewall, of the prominent landowning Barnewall family of Crickstown, County Meath. There are references in different sources to a son and three daughters. Little is known of his son, who seems to have died young and without issue: the daughters were -

1. Elizabeth (died 1506): she married firstly Christopher Plunket, second Baron Killeen, and secondly James Fleming, 7th Baron Slane, and had at least three children:

-by her first husband two daughters:

- Genet, who married Nicholas St Lawrence, 4th Baron Howth;
- Elizabeth, who married John Darcy IV of Platten and was the mother of Sir William Darcy;

-and by her second husband:

- Christopher Fleming, 8th Baron Slane.
- Eleanor Fleming, who married Edmund Plunkett, 3rd Baron Killeen

2. Ismay, who married Thomas Nangle, 15th Baron of Navan and had issue including:

- John Nangle, 16th Baron of Navan

3. Catherine, who married Walter Cheevers (or Chevir) of Ballyhealy, County Wexford and Macetown, County Meath, son of William Chevir, judge of the Court of King's Bench (Ireland), and issue including:

- Sir Nicholas Cheevers;
- Elizabeth, who married into the prominent Ussher family of Donnybrook, County Dublin;
- Margaret, who married Bartholomew Aylmer and was the mother of Sir Gerald Aylmer.

His wife Anne was dead by 1476: she was described as being the former wife of John Darcy of Platten, possibly the father of John IV who married her granddaughter.
