= John Welles, 5th Baron Welles =

English soldier and noble (1352–1421)

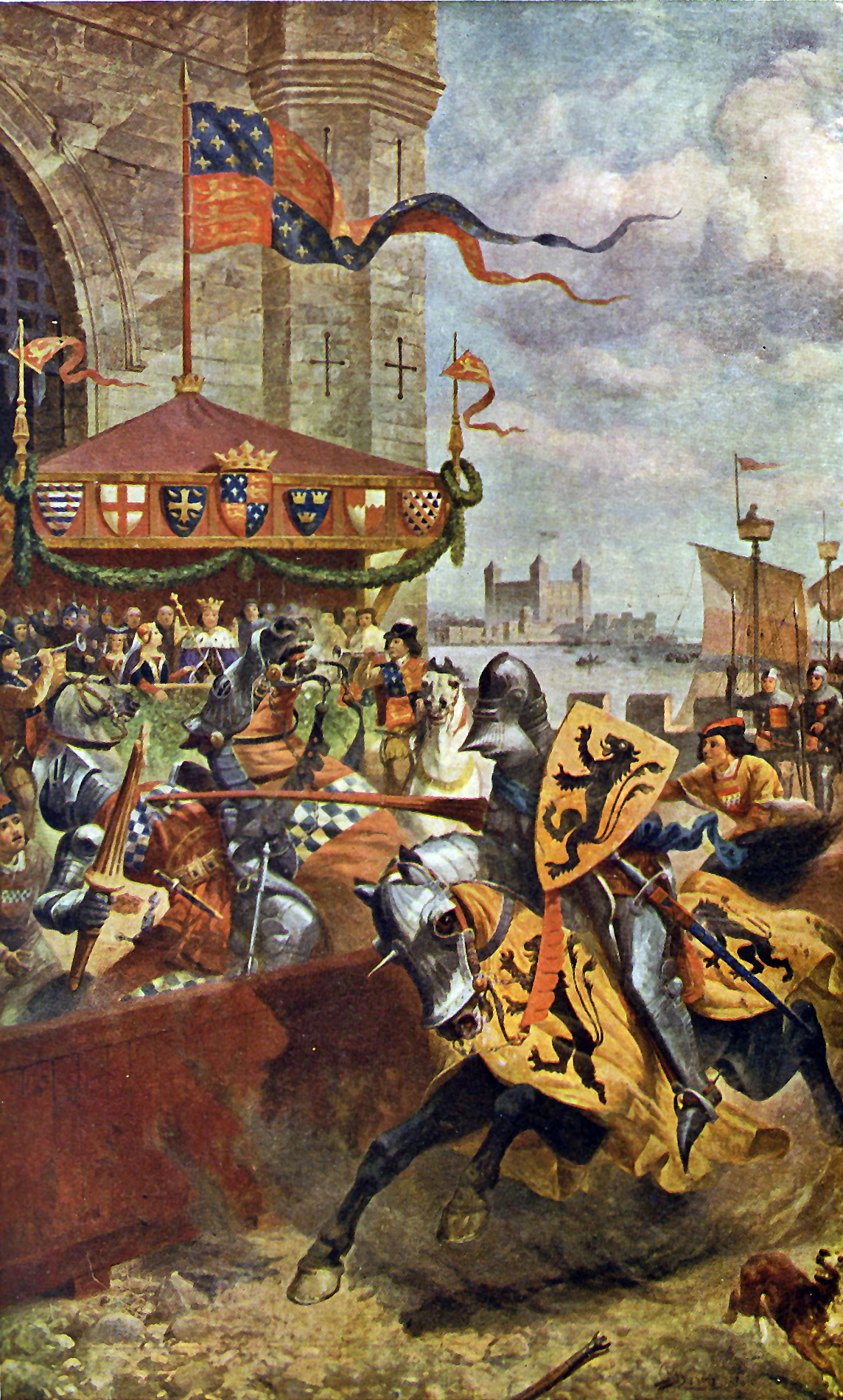
Welles striking Lindsay in their famous joust (1886 painting)

John de Welles, 5th Baron Welles (1352–1421) was an English soldier and noble. The son of John de Welles, 4th Baron Welles and Maud de Ros. He married Eleanor de Mowbray, daughter of John de Mowbray, 4th Baron Mowbray, and Elizabeth de Segrave, 5th Baroness Segrave.

He was summoned to parliament between 20 January 1376 and 26 February 1421.

At a banquet in Edinburgh and presumably after too much alcohol he issued, as Champion of England, the following challenge to David Lindsay (later 1st Earl of Crawford): "Let words have no place; if ye know not the Chivalry and Valiant deeds of Englishmen; appoint me a day and a place where ye list, and ye shall have experience". As a result of the challenge, on St George’s Day, 23 April 1390, he fought David Lindsay in mock combat on horseback on London Bridge, losing the match by falling from his horse in their third charge against each other.

He was the father of:

- Eudo de Welles (1387-1417), who predeceased his father. He married Maud Greystoke, daughter of Ralph de Greystoke, 3rd Baron Greystoke and Katherine Clifford. by whom he had two sons:

- Lionel de Welles, 6th Baron Welles.
- Sir William Welles, Lord Chancellor of Ireland, married to Anne Barnewall, daughter of Sir Christopher Barnewall, and had issue including Elizabeth, Lady Slane and Ismay, Lady Navan;

- Eleanor de Welles (1390-1458) who married Hugh de Poynings, son of Thomas Poynings, 3rd Baron Poynings and Joan ..., and had issue

== See also ==
- Crawford Castle for additional details of challenge

== Notes ==
Peerage of England
Preceded by John de Welles	Baron Welles; 1361–1421	Succeeded by Lionel de Welles
