= John Mowbray, 4th Baron Mowbray =

English peer (1340–1368)

John de Mowbray, 4th Baron Mowbray
- Baron Mowbray
- Arms of Mowbray: Gules, a lion rampant argent
- Tenure: 4 October 1361 - 19 October 1368
- Predecessor: John de Mowbray, 3rd Baron Mowbray
- Successor: John de Mowbray, 1st Earl of Nottingham
- Born: 24 June 1340; Epworth, Lincolnshire, England
- Died: 19 October 1368 (aged 28) near Constantinople, Turkey
- Spouses: Elizabeth de Segrave, 5th Baroness Segrave
- Issue: Margaret de Mowbray, Lady de Lucy; Joan de Mowbray, Lady Grey; Eleanor de Mowbray, Baroness Welles; John de Mowbray, 1st Earl of Nottingham; Thomas de Mowbray, 1st Duke of Norfolk
- Father: John de Mowbray, 3rd Baron Mowbray
- Mother: Joan of Lancaster

John (III) de Mowbray, 4th Baron Mowbray (24 June 1340 – 19 October 1368) was an English peer. He was slain near Constantinople while en route to the Holy Land.

== Family ==
John de Mowbray, born 25 June 1340 at Epworth, Lincolnshire, was the son of John de Mowbray, 3rd Baron Mowbray, of Axholme, Lincolnshire, by his second wife, Joan of Lancaster, third daughter of Henry, 3rd Earl of Lancaster, a grandson of King Henry III.

== Career ==
Mowbray and twenty-six others were knighted by King Edward III of England in July 1355 while English forces were at the Downs, before sailing to France. In 1356, he served in a campaign in Brittany. He had livery of his lands on 14 November 1361; however, his inheritance was subject to the dower which his father had settled on his stepmother, Elizabeth de Vere.

By 1369, his stepmother had married Sir William de Cossington, son and heir of Stephen de Cossington of Cossington in Aylesford, Kent; not long after the marriage, she and her new husband surrendered themselves to the Fleet prison for debt. According to Archer, the cause may have been Mowbray's prosecution of his stepmother for waste of his estates; he had been awarded damages against her of almost £1000.

Around 1343, an agreement had been made for a double marriage between, Mowbray and Audrey Montagu, the granddaughter of Thomas of Brotherton, and Mowbray's sister, Blanche de Mowbray with Audrey's brother, Edward Montagu. Neither marriage took place. Instead, in about 1349, a double marriage took place between Mowbray and Elizabeth de Segrave (also a granddaughter of Thomas of Brotherton), and Mowbray's sister Blanche with Elizabeth's brother, John de Segrave, Pope Clement VI having granted dispensations for the marriages at the request of Mowbray's grandfather, the Earl of Lancaster, in order to prevent 'disputes between the parents', who were neighbours.

Mowbray had little financial benefit from his marriage during his lifetime as a result of the very large jointure which had been awarded to Elizabeth's mother, Margaret of Brotherton, Duchess of Norfolk, who lived until 1399.

However, when Elizabeth's father, John de Segrave, 4th Baron Segrave, died on 1 April 1353, King Edward III allowed Mowbray to receive a small portion of his wife's eventual inheritance. Estate accounts for 1367 indicate that Mowbray enjoyed an annual income of almost £800 at that time. Elizabeth then succeeded her father as 5th Baroness Segrave, her brother having predeceased their father.

Mowbray was summoned to Parliament from 14 August 1362 to 20 January 1366. On 10 October 1367, he appointed attorneys in preparation for travel beyond the seas; these appointments were confirmed in the following year. Mowbray was slain by the Turks near Constantinople while en route to the Holy Land. A letter from the priory of 'Peyn' written in 1396 suggests that he was initially buried at the convent at Pera, opposite Constantinople; according to the letter, 'at the instance of his son Thomas', his bones had been gathered and were sent to England for burial with his ancestors.

His will was proved at Lincoln on 17 May 1369. His wife Elizabeth predeceased him in 1368, by only a few months.

== Marriage and issue ==
Mowbray married, by papal dispensation dated 25 March 1349, Elizabeth de Segrave (born 25 October 1338 at Croxton Abbey), suo jure 5th Baroness Segrave, daughter and heiress of John de Segrave, 4th Baron Segrave (d. 1353), and Margaret of Brotherton, Duchess of Norfolk, daughter and heiress of Thomas of Brotherton, son of King Edward I. Through the marriage, the Mowbray family gained the estate in Framlingham, Suffolk, including Framlingham Castle, which became the main seat of power for the Mowbray family for most of the 15th century.

They had two sons and three daughters:

- Margaret de Mowbray (c. 1361 - 24 April 1404), who married, by licence dated 1 July 1369, Sir Reginald de Lucy (d. 9 November 1437) of Woodcroft in Luton, Bedfordshire, son and heir of Sir Geoffrey de Lucy of Dallington, Slapton, Newington, etc.
- Joan de Mowbray (c. 1363 - 30 November 1402), who married firstly Sir Thomas Grey (1359 – 26 November or 3 December 1400) of Heaton near Norham, Northumberland, son of the chronicler, Sir Thomas Grey. They had four sons and one daughter, including John Grey, 1st Earl of Tankerville. She married secondly, Sir Thomas Tunstall of Thurland in Tunstall, Lancashire (c. 1360 – 1415).
- Eleanor de Mowbray (born before 25 March 1364), who married John de Welles, 5th Baron Welles. Their issue included two sons and two daughters, including Eudo de Welles (1387-1417), who married Maud Greystoke, daughter of Ralph de Greystoke, 3rd Baron Greystoke; their two sons were Lionel de Welles, 6th Baron Welles, and Sir William Welles, Lord Chancellor of Ireland.
- John Mowbray, 1st Earl of Nottingham, 5th Baron Mowbray, 6th Baron Segrave (1 August 1365 – 12 January 1383), who died unmarried, and was buried at the Whitefriars, London.
- Thomas de Mowbray, 1st Duke of Norfolk, 1st Earl of Nottingham, 6th Baron Mowbray, 7th Baron Segrave (22 March 1366 - 22 September 1399), who married firstly the 10-year-old Lady Elizabeth Lestrange (c. 6 December 1373 – 23 August 1383), suo jure Lady Strange of Blackmere - daughter and heiress of John le Strange, 5th Baron Strange of Blackmere, and Lady Isabel de Beauchamp, daughter of Thomas de Beauchamp, 11th Earl of Warwick - around 20 February 1383. Elizabeth died, however, in 1383, not long after the wedding, leading Thomas to marry secondly Lady Elizabeth FitzAlan (c. 1372 – 8 July 1425), daughter of Richard FitzAlan, 11th Earl of Arundel and Lady Elizabeth de Bohun. By Elizabeth, he had issue:

- Thomas de Mowbray, 4th Earl of Norfolk, 2nd Earl of Nottingham, 8th Baron Segrave, 7th Baron Mowbray (17 September 1385 – 8 June 1405), who never married, and had no issue.
- John de Mowbray, 2nd Duke of Norfolk, 3rd Earl of Nottingham, 8th Baron Mowbray, 9th Baron Segrave (1392 – 19 October 1432), who married Lady Katherine Neville, daughter of Ralph Neville, 1st Earl of Westmorland, and had one son, John de Mowbray, 3rd Duke of Norfolk, 4th Earl of Nottingham, 6th Earl of Norfolk, 9th Baron Mowbray, 10th Baron Segrave (12 September 1415 – 6 November 1461).
- Elizabeth de Mowbray, who married Michael de la Pole, 3rd Earl of Suffolk (1394 – 25 October 1415), the eldest son of Michael de la Pole, 2nd Earl of Suffolk and Katherine de Stafford, by whom she had three daughters.
- Margaret de Mowbray, who married firstly Sir Robert Howard (1385—1436), and married secondly Sir John Grey. No known issue.
- Isabel de Mowbray (b. 1396 - d. 29 November 1452), who married firstly Sir Henry Ferrers, son of William, Baron Ferrers of Groby, with no issue; and married secondly James Berkeley, 1st Baron Berkeley (c. 1394 – 22 October 1463), by whom she had four sons - including William de Berkeley, 1st Marquess of Berkeley (c. 1427 - 1492), and Sir Maurice de Berkeley VI, Lord Berkeley (c. 1435 - 1 September 1506) - and three daughters.

== Notes ==
Peerage of England
Preceded by John Mowbray II	Baron Mowbray; 1361–1368	Succeeded by John Mowbray IV
Preceded by John Segrave	Baron Segrave; With: Elizabeth Segrave	Succeeded by John Mowbray IV
