= William Stourton, 7th Baron Stourton =

English Baron (c.1505–1548)

Arms of Stourton: Sable, a bend or between six fountains

William Stourton, 7th Baron Stourton (c. 1505 – 1548) was the eldest son of Edward Stourton, 6th Baron Stourton, and his wife Agnes Fauntleroy, daughter of John Fauntleroy of Dorset.

He succeeded his father as Baron Stourton in 1535. His wife was Elizabeth Dudley, daughter of Edmund Dudley, a key advisor to King Henry VII, and his first wife Anne Windsor, sister of Andrew Windsor, 1st Baron Windsor. They had seven sons, including Charles, William and Arthur, and two daughters, including Ursula who married Edward Clinton, 1st Earl of Lincoln.

His affair with Agnes Rice, daughter of Rhys ap Gruffyd and granddaughter of Thomas Howard, 2nd Duke of Norfolk, caused much scandal. He brought Agnes to live in his house, and separated from his wife. At his death he left most of the Stourton estates to Agnes, resulting in years of litigation between her and his eldest son and heir Charles, who had quarrelled bitterly with his father, calling him a "false hypocrite" who belonged in prison. William and Agnes had one daughter, also called Agnes.

He was a Member of the Parliament of England for Somerset in 1529, although he admitted to finding the office a burden, as he was then managing the family estates on behalf of his aged father; he asked that both of them be excused from further attendance at Parliament. In religion, he seems to have been a conservative.

He seems to have been more skilled as a military commander than as a politician. He played a part in suppressing the Pilgrimage of Grace, and saw action in Scotland, and later in France, where he spent much of his last years, serving with distinction as the English Deputy at Newhaven.

== Family and children ==
His children included:

- Charles Stourton, 8th Baron Stourton, who was executed for the murder of William Hartgill nine years later in 1557.
- Andrew Stourton,
- Arthur Stourton, a younger son, who was a keeper of royal robes and jewels.
- William Stourton of Worminster and Fauntleroy Marsh (Folke), who married (1) Thomasine FitzJames, (2) Mary Morgan, widow of Robert Morgan of Mapperton (died 1567), and daughter of John and Agnes Wogan of Silving or Silvinch in Whitelackington.
- Ursula Stourton, who married Edward Clinton, 1st Earl of Lincoln
- Dorothy Stourton, who married Richard Brent of Cossington. Their daughter married Lord Thomas Paulet, a son of William Paulet, 1st Marquess of Winchester. Brent's sister, Grace, married John Denham. Richard Brent was found to be incapable of managing his lands.

== Notes ==
Peerage of England
Preceded by Edward Stourton	Baron Stourton; 1535–1548	Succeeded by Charles Stourton
