= Nicholas Segrave, 1st Baron Segrave =

Arms of Segrave.

Nicholas Segrave, 1st Baron Segrave (also Seagrave; c. 1238 – bef. 12 November 1295) was an English baronial leader. Nicholas was grandson of Stephen de Segrave. Segrave was one of the most prominent baronial leaders during the reign of King Henry III.

On 4 August 1265 he was wounded at the Battle of Evesham and taken prisoner, however on 1 July 1267 he was granted a pardon. In 1295 he was summoned to Parliament to be made a Baron. He died by 12 November of the same year and was succeeded in the barony by his son John.

== Marriage and issue ==
Nicholas married Maud de Lucy, daughter of Geoffrey de Lucy, Knt., of Newington in Kent, Cublington, Buckinghamshire, Dallington and Slapton, Northamptonshire, etc., by his wife, Nichole. Nicholas and Matilda 'Maud' had the following issue:

- John Segrave, 2nd Baron Segrave, born 1256, died 1325, married Christian de Plescy.
- Nicholas Segrave, Knt., was a soldier and administrator, and lord of Stowe in Northamptonshire. From 1308 to 1316 he was Lord Marshal of England. He died in 1321.
- Henry Segrave, Knt.
- Geoffrey Segrave, Knt., Sheriff of Leicestershire in 1307
- Simon Segrave
- Gilbert Segrave, Bishop of London
- Stephen Segrave Archdeacon of Essex.
- Annabel Segrave, married John du Plessis (a grandson of John du Plessis, 7th Earl of Warwick)
- Eleanor Segrave, married Alan la Zouche, 1st Baron la Zouche of Ashby.

Peerage of England
| New creation | Baron Segrave; 1295 | Succeeded by John Segrave |
