= John de Mowbray, 1st Earl of Nottingham =

John de Mowbray
- Earl of Nottingham
- Successor: Thomas de Mowbray, 1st Duke of Norfolk
- Born: 1 August 1365; Epworth, Lincolnshire, England
- Died: 12 January 1383 (aged 17); Isle of Axholme, Lincolnshire, England
- Buried: Whitefriars, London
- Noble family: House of Mowbray
- Father: John de Mowbray, 4th Baron Mowbray
- Mother: Elizabeth de Segrave

Arms of Mowbray: Gules, a lion rampant argent

John (IV) de Mowbray, 1st Earl of Nottingham, 5th Baron Mowbray, 6th Baron Segrave (1 August 1365 – 12 January 1383), was an English peer.

Born 1 August 1365 at Epworth in the Isle of Axholme, Lincolnshire, John de Mowbray was the elder son of John de Mowbray, 4th Baron Mowbray, and Elizabeth Segrave. He had a younger brother, Thomas de Mowbray, 1st Duke of Norfolk, and three sisters, Eleanor, Margaret and Joan (for details concerning his siblings, see the article on his father, John de Mowbray, 4th Baron Mowbray). He was styled 'cousin' by John of Gaunt, 1st Duke of Lancaster.

At the death of his mother in 1368, Mowbray is said to have become Baron Segrave. However he had little financial benefit from his inheritance as a result of the very large jointure which had been awarded to Elizabeth Segrave's mother, Margaret, Duchess of Norfolk, who lived until 1399.

In 1368 he also succeeded to the barony of Mowbray when his father was slain by the Turks near Constantinople while en route to the Holy Land.

In April 1372, custody of both John and his brother Thomas was granted to Blanche Wake, a sister of their grandmother, Joan of Lancaster. On 23 April 1377, he was knighted in company with the future Richard II and the future Henry IV when the latter two noblemen were made Knights of the Bath. When Richard II was crowned on 16 July 1377, Mowbray was created Earl of Nottingham. As joint tenants of the estates of William Beauchamp of Bedford, he and William Latimer, 4th Baron Latimer successfully claimed the right to serve as Almoner at the coronation.

Mowbray died before 12 February 1383, aged seventeen and unmarried, and was buried at the Whitefriars in Fleet Street, London. The earldom of Nottingham became extinct at his death. He was succeeded in the barony of Mowbray by his younger brother, Thomas de Mowbray, 1st Duke of Norfolk, who subsequently became Earl of Nottingham on 12 January 1386 by a new creation of the earldom.

== Notes ==
- Archer, Rowena E. (2004). "Mowbray, John (III), fourth Lord Mowbray (1340–1368)". Oxford Dictionary of National Biography (online ed.). Oxford University Press. doi:10.1093/ref:odnb/19452. (Subscription, Wikipedia Library access or UK public library membership required.)
- Caley, John; Ellis, Henry; Bandinel, Bulkeley (1846). Monasticon Anglicanum by Sir William Dugdale. Vol. VI, Part I (New ed.). London: James Bohn.
- Cokayne, G.E. (1936). H.A. Doubleday & Lord Howard de Walden (eds.). The Complete Peerage. Vol. IX (2nd ed.). London: St. Catherine Press.
- Richardson, D. (2011). Kimball G. Everingham (ed.). Magna Carta Ancestry. Vol. III (2nd ed.). Salt Lake City. ISBN 978-1449966393.
- Tait, James (1894). "Mowbray, John de (d.1361)" . In Lee, Sidney (ed.). Dictionary of National Biography. Vol. 39. London: Smith, Elder & Co. pp. 219–21.

Peerage of England
Preceded by John Mowbray III	Baron Mowbray; 1368–1383	Succeeded by Thomas Mowbray I
Preceded by Elizabeth Segrave; John Mowbray III	Baron Segrave; 1375–1383	Succeeded by Thomas Mowbray I
New title	Earl of Nottingham; 1377–1383	Extinct
