= Robert Howard (knight) =

English nobleman

Sir Robert Howard (1385—1436), Knight, of Stoke by Nayland, Suffolk, was a member of the 15th-century English gentry in Norfolk. He was a minor royal official and probably a retainer of John Mowbray, 2nd Duke of Norfolk. His father outlived him, his brother was murdered, but his son John was granted the by-then extinct Dukedom of Norfolk in 1483.

== Early life ==
Robert Howard's family were prominent local gentry family in East Anglia with a lineage dating back to the thirteenth century, and have been described as "one of the wealthiest and most prestigious gentry lines in England." He was the eldest son of John Howard (c. 1366 - 1437), of Wiggenhall and East Winch, Norfolk, by the latter's second wife, Alice Tendring. Alice was also an heiress, although not to the same degree as John Howard's first wife, Lady Plaiz, who had brought him estates worth over £400 per annum. They had two sons; Robert was the elder. His younger brother, Henry Howard (d. 1446) was later murdered by retainers of John, Baron Scrope of Masham, after his parents and brother had died.

Robert Howard senior "naturally found no difficulty in securing marriages for his children and grandchild with important gentry families."

– The History of Parliament

== Marriage ==
In 1420, Howard married Lady Margaret Mowbray, daughter of Thomas de Mowbray, 1st Duke of Norfolk. In the words of the historian Anne Crawford it was "a clearly unequal marriage", and since Howard was in the duke's service, to marry his sister was "spectacular". It does appear, however, that they made the decision to marry for themselves as adults, rather than as was customary for the period, by arrangement as children. Their daughter Katherine married Edward Neville, 3rd Baron Bergavenny. Margaret outlived Robert, surviving until 1459.

Margaret’s sister, Isabel, had married James, later Baron Berkeley, which, it has been said, "forged a link between the Berkeleys and the Howards that continued for two centuries." Later marriages between the two families further strengthened the dynastic links between them.

== Career ==
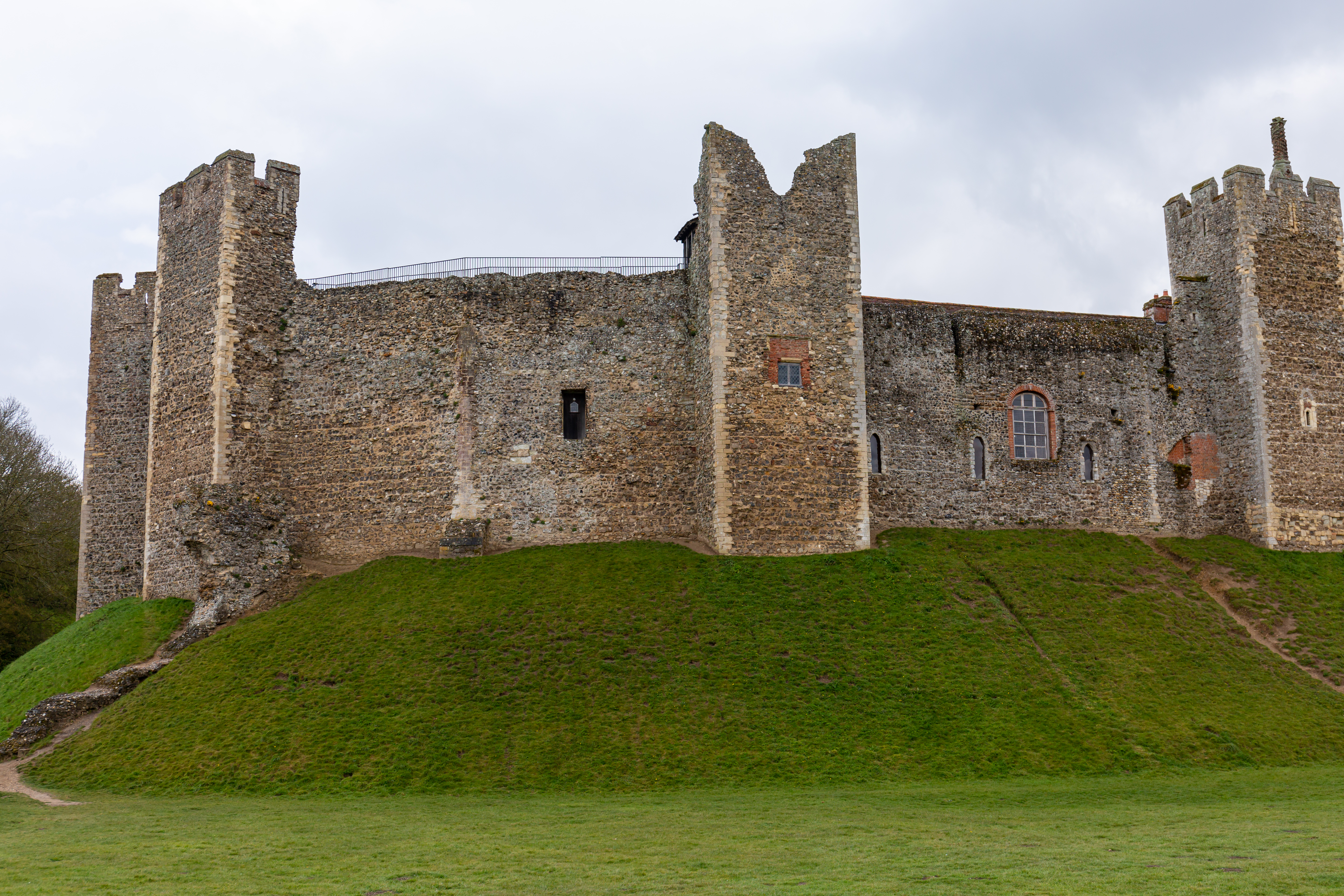
Framlingham Castle, Suffolk, where Howard and his wife lived for some years

There is little comprehensive knowledge available as to Howard's career. Early historians of the family made what have been called "somewhat grand claims" on his behalf: for example, that he commanded a fleet of 3,000 men out of Lowestoft to attack the French coast whilst Henry V was on campaign there. It is considered extremely doubtful that this actually ever occurred since such an undertaking would have certainly left its mark in official local or governmental records. It may well be that grandiose stories have been imagined around a simple truth; viz that Howard did indeed fight in France, but that he did so alongside his brother-in-law and regional magnate, John Mowbray, 2nd Duke of Norfolk, who indeed spent much of his career doing precisely that.

Although Howard is not mentioned on any of the surviving lists of retainers Mowbray took with him, it is likely that Howard was a member of the duke's household. He had, after all, married Mowbray's sister. Further, in November 1428, as the duke sailed up the River Thames to Westminster, his barge rammed a pier under London Bridge; Mowbray lost several members of his household in this accident. Not only did the duke survive, but Mowbray is recorded as having been with him and surviving also. Howard—and presumably his wife—probably lived with the duke at his caput of Framlingham Castle until Mowbray died in 1432.

John Howard outlived his son, although only by around a year. In 1436 John loaned the crown £100 for the Duke of York's expedition to France that year, and shortly after departed for the Holy Land on crusade. Although he reached Jerusalem he died there on 17 November 1437. Robert Howard's mother had pre-deceased them both; she left Robert her manor of Stoke by Nayland in her will. Howard and Margaret had had three children, John, Katherine, and Margaret. John was to be a prominent retainer for the third duke of Norfolk, and when civil war broke out less than twenty years later, he was to play a leading role as one of the House of York's firmest supporters.

== Legacy ==
In 1483, when Richard III took the throne, he rewarded John Howard with the by now-extinct Mowbray dukedom of Norfolk. (Note: The fourth and last Mowbray Duke of Norfolk (the second duke's grandson) had died suddenly in 1476, leaving no male heir.)
