= John Segrave, 4th Baron Segrave =

English peer & landowner (1315–1353)

- Arms of Segrave.
- Born: 4 May 1315
- Died: 1 April 1353 (aged 37); Repton, Derbyshire
- Buried: Grey Friars, London
- Spouse: Margaret of Brotherton, Duchess of Norfolk
- Issue: John de Segrave; Elizabeth Segrave, Baroness Mowbray; Margaret Segrave
- Father: Stephen Segrave, 3rd Baron Segrave
- Mother: Alice FitzAlan

John Segrave, 4th Baron Segrave (4 May 1315 – 1 April 1353) was an English peer and landowner in Leicestershire and Yorkshire. His family title of Baron Segrave is drawn from a village now spelled Seagrave, which uses a coat of arms imitated from that of the family.

Segrave was the son of Stephen Segrave, 3rd Baron Segrave and Alice Fitzalan. Little is known of his early life.

About 1335, Segrave married Margaret of Brotherton, daughter and eventual sole heiress of Thomas of Brotherton, son of King Edward I of England by his second wife, Margaret of France. Their children were:

- John Segrave, who died young.
- John Segrave (died before 1 April 1353), a second son of the name, who was contracted to marry Blanche of Lancaster, younger daughter and coheiress of Henry of Grosmont, 1st Duke of Lancaster. However, the contract was later declared void. About 1349, a double marriage was solemnised in which John married Blanche Mowbray, while John's sister, Elizabeth Segrave, married Blanche's brother, John de Mowbray, 4th Baron Mowbray, Pope Clement VI having granted dispensations for the marriages at the request of Henry, 3rd Earl of Lancaster, in order to prevent 'disputes between the parents', who were neighbours.
- Elizabeth Segrave, 5th Baroness Segrave suo jure, who married John de Mowbray, 4th Baron Mowbray.
- Margaret Segrave, who died young, before 1353.

A year after Segrave's marriage to Margaret of Brotherton, his wife inherited her father's title and estates, becoming in her own right Countess of Norfolk and Earl Marshal of England.

In 1350, Segrave's wife, Margaret, Duchess of Norfolk, sought an annulment, arguing that they had been contracted in marriage before Margaret was of age, and that she had never consented to the marriage. The impetus for this was that Margaret wished to marry Lord Manny, with whom she had an understanding. However, Segrave died at Bretby in Repton, Derbyshire, on 1 April 1353, before the annulment had been granted or refused. He was succeeded in the barony by his daughter, Elizabeth, 5th Baroness Segrave.

== Notes ==
Peerage of England
Preceded by Stephen Segrave	Baron Segrave; 1325–1353	Succeeded by Elizabeth Segrave; John Mowbray
