= Meautys =

Meautys is a surname, there are several variant spellings in use. Notable people with the surname include:

- Jane Meautys, English courtier
- Thomas Meautys (1592–1649), English civil servant and politician
- Peter Meutas (died 1562), English courtier and soldier
