= Arthur Gorges =

English sea captain, poet, translator and courtier (c. 1569 – 1625)

Member of Parliament for Yarmouth
- In office 1584–1586 Serving with William Stubbs
- Preceded by: Constituency established
- Succeeded by: Thomas West, 2nd Baron De La Warr

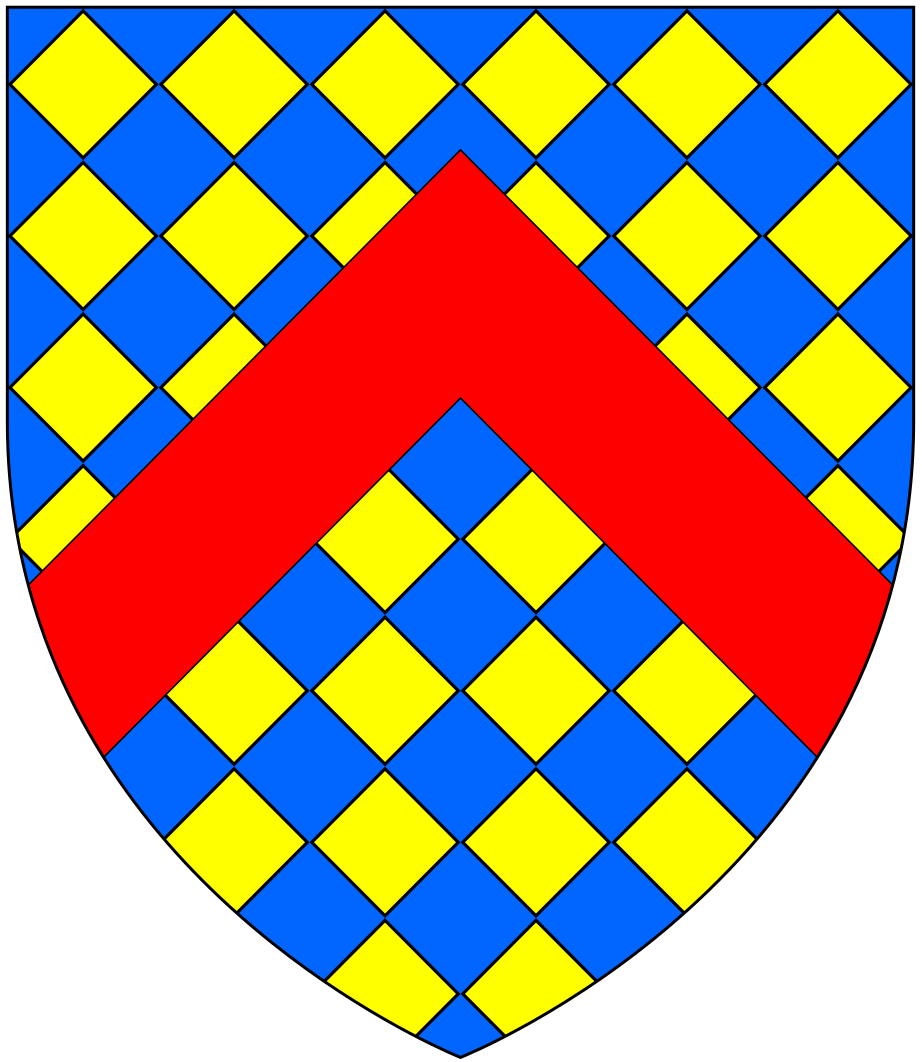
Arms of Gorges (modern): Lozengy or and azure, a chevron gules. These arms resulted from the famous 1347 heraldry case of Warbelton v Gorges.

Sir Arthur Gorges (c. 1569 – 10 October 1625) was an English sea captain, poet, translator and courtier from Somerset.

== Origins ==
He was the son of Sir William Gorges (d.1584) of Charlton, in the parish of Wraxall in Somerset, lord of the manor of Wraxall, by his wife Winifred Budockshed, heiress of the manor of Budockshed in the parish of St Budeaux, near Plymouth in Devon. Sir William Gorges was knighted in Ireland in 1579, was Vice Admiral of the Fleet in 1580, and Constable of the Tower of London. He died in December 1584, in the Tower of London. Arthur Gorges' brother Tristram Gorges (c. 1562 – 8 May 1608) was entrusted by Sir Francis Drake with the custody of Don Pedro de Valdez who was captured in the fight with the Spanish Armada in 1588. He took Don Pedro to the Tower of London.

The Gorges family in the Elizabethan era included Sir Ferdinando Gorges, founder of the Province of Maine, and Arthur Gorges' uncle, Sir Thomas Gorges of Longford Castle, who married Helena, Marchioness of Northampton. Arthur Gorges was Elizabeth I's 3rd cousin as they both shared the same great-great-grandfather, John Howard, 1st Duke of Norfolk.

== Life ==
A cousin of both Walter Raleigh and Charles Arundell, Arthur Gorges was a member of the Howard circle (the Oxford-Howard circle of Catholic courtiers in the late 1570s)—Arundell claimed Oxford had tried to have Gorges murdered on the Richmond Green.

He was elected Member of Parliament in 1584 for Yarmouth, IoW, in 1589 for Camelford, in 1593 for Dorset and in 1601 for Rye.

He fought in the campaign against the Spanish Armada. In 1597 he commanded the War-Spite, in which Walter Raleigh sailed as Vice Admiral under the Earl of Essex, Robert Devereux, on the Islands Voyage.

He was one of nine who were knighted on 29 October 1597.

== Family life ==
He lived at Gorges House (later named Milman House). His family possessed considerable property in Chelsea in the reign of Queen Elizabeth, where he built "Brickills", later named Stanley House. In November 1599 when Queen Elizabeth passed the "fair new house in Chelsea", Gorges presented her with a fair jewel. In 1620, he sold the large house known as Chelsea Park (former home of Thomas More and the future Beaufort House) to Lionel Cranfield, 1st Earl of Middlesex.

Arthur Gorges married twice, first to Douglas Howard in 1584, with whom he had one daughter, Ambrosia (1588–1600). Douglas Howard was the daughter and heir of Henry Howard, 2nd Viscount Howard of Bindon. His father, Thomas Howard, 1st Viscount Howard of Bindon, was the second son of Thomas Howard, 3rd Duke of Norfolk, uncle to Anne Boleyn and Catherine Howard, two wives of Henry VIII.

Sir Robert Stanley, second son of William, sixth Earl of Derby, married Elizabeth, daughter of Sir Arthur Gorges, and Stanley then seems to have lived at Stanley House.

Queen Elizabeth obtained the marriage rights of Ambrosia Gorges. Gorges contracted with the queen for the wardship, paying £1000, with a gift of a pearl bracelet with a clasp set diamonds and rubies which cost £500. He lost these investments on his daughter's death in 1600.

Gorges' second marriage was to Elizabeth Clinton, daughter of Henry Clinton, 2nd Earl of Lincoln, in 1597. They had twelve children.

On the death of Arthur Gorges' first wife, Edmund Spenser wrote the poem "Daphnaïda". In the poem "Alcyon" is Sir Arthur Gorges.

Daphnaïda
An elegie vpon the death of the noble and vertuous Dovglas Howard, daughter and heire of Henry Lord Howard, Viscount Byndon, and wife of Arthur Gorges Esquier.

Dedicated to the Right honorable the Ladie Helena, Marquesse of Northampton.

By Ed. Sp.

His monument is in Chelsea Old Church. A brass plate, now fixed to the north wall, is engraved with the kneeling effigies of Sir Arthur Gorges and his six sons on one side of a small table, and his wife and five daughters on the other.

== Works ==
His works include "Lucans Pharsalia" (with a preface in poetry by Walter Raleigh), and a translation into English of Francis Bacon's The Wisedome of the Ancients from the original Latin, published in 1619.

He is included in the Oxford Book of Sonnets (2000) published by the Oxford University Press, along with Walter Raleigh, Edmund Spenser, Michael Drayton, and other poets of the time.

== Books ==
- Arthur Gorges, Spenser's Alcyon and Ralegh's friend. Author: Helen Estabrook Sandison. Publisher: [n.p., 1928?]
- Poems. Author: Arthur Gorges, Sir; Helen Estabrook Sandison. Publisher: Oxford, Clarendon Press, 1953.
- The Story of a Family through Eleven Centuries, Illustrated by Portraits and Pedigrees: Being a History of the Family of Gorges. by Raymond Gorges, Frederick Brown; Merrymount Press, 1944. 293 pgs.
