= Joan Astley =

Joan Astley may refer to:

- Joan Bright Astley (1910–2008), British intelligence officer and organizer during World War II
- Jane Meutas (1510s–1550s), Jane or Joan, maiden name Astley, lady-in-waiting
