= Helen Parr =

Helen Parr may refer to:

- Helen Parr (The Incredibles), a fictional character in the animated film The Incredibles
- Helena, Marchioness of Northampton (1548/49–1635), Swedish-born noblewoman
