= Thomas Howard, 3rd Viscount Howard of Bindon =

English peer and politician

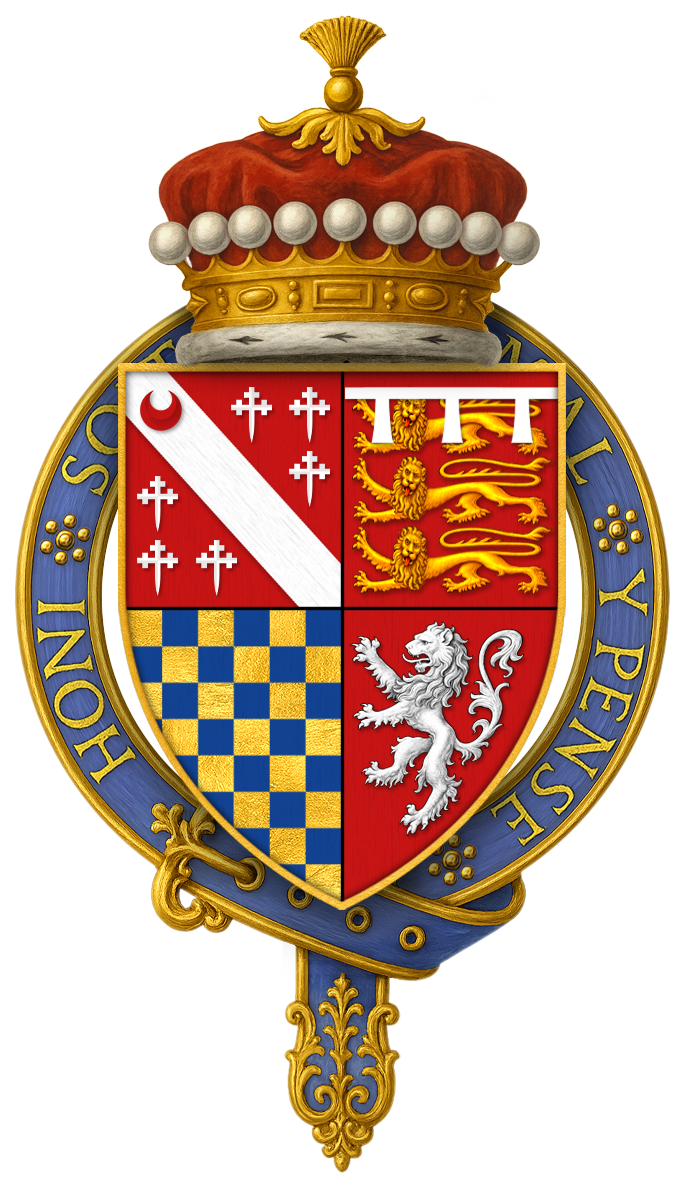
Arms Sir Thomas Howard, 3rd Viscount Howard of Bindon, KG

Thomas Howard, 3rd Viscount Howard of Bindon (died 1611) was an English peer and politician. He was a Knight of the Garter, Lord Lieutenant of Dorset 25 April 1601 – 1 March 1611, Custos Rotulorum of Dorset before 1605–1611, and Vice-Admiral of Dorset 1603–1611. He was the Member of Parliament for Dorset in 1563. He was the son of Thomas Howard, 1st Viscount Howard of Bindon, who was the youngest son of Thomas Howard, 3rd Duke of Norfolk. He was described by Rachel Lloyd as 'very spiteful and a cauldron of misdirected energy'.

He succeeded to the viscountcy in 1590, upon the childless death of his elder brother, Henry. The title became extinct when he died in 1611 without male children.

Viscount Bindon built Lulworth Castle. In 1607 he described the building as a conception of his own mind, and wrote to Robert Cecil, 1st Earl of Salisbury crediting his part in origins of the design;

"If this little pile in Lulworth Park shall prove pretty or worth the labour bestowed in the erecting of it, I will acknowledge, as the truth is, that your powerful speech to me at Bindon laid the first foundation of the pile in my mind, which ever since has laboured for a speedy finishing for the contentment of those for whose further liking of that place the care is taken."

Peerage of England
Preceded by Henry Howard	Viscount Howard of Bindon; 1590–1611	Extinct
