= Baron Gorges of Dundalk =

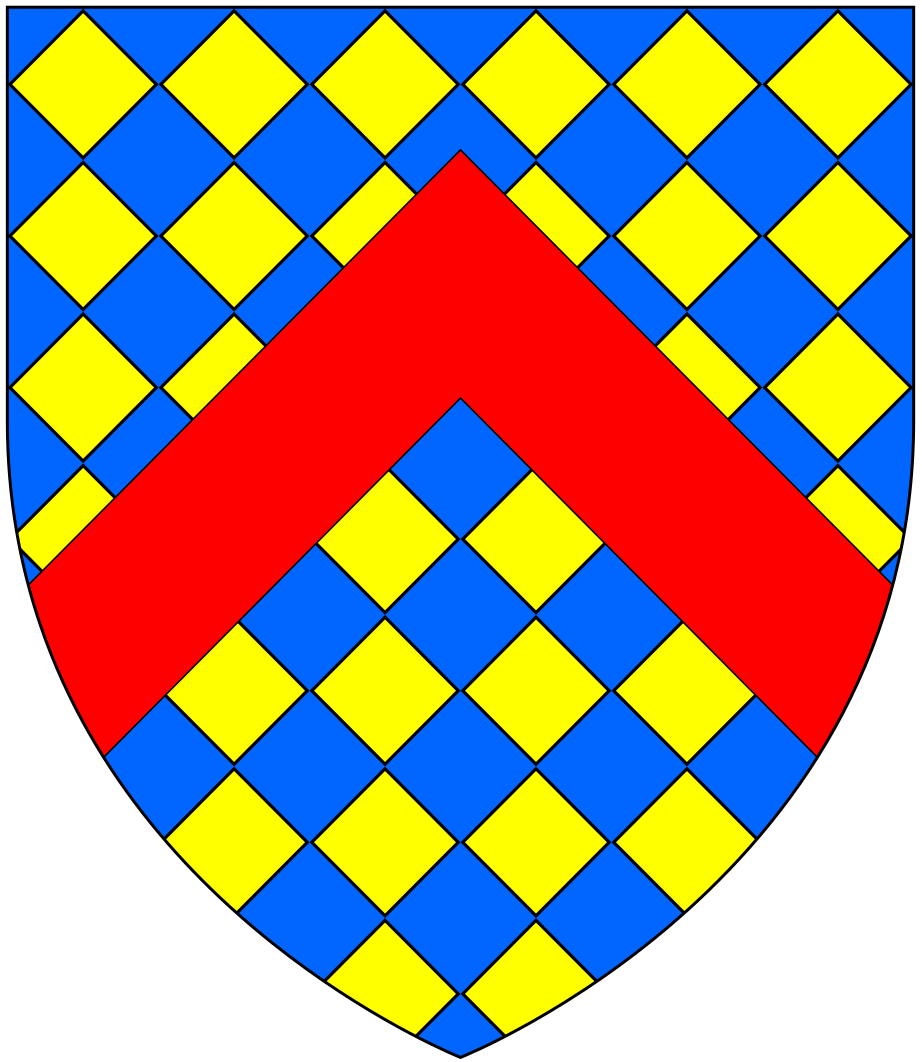
Arms of Gorges (modern): Lozengy or and azure, a chevron gules. These arms resulted from the famous 1347 heraldry case of Warbelton v Gorges

Baron Gorges of Dundalk was a title in the Peerage of Ireland. It was created on 13 July 1620 for Sir Edward Gorges, 1st Baronet. He had already been created a baronet, of Langford in the County of Wiltshire, in the Baronetage of England on 25 November 1611. Lord Gorges of Dundalk was the eldest surviving son of Sir Thomas Gorges, of Longford Castle, Wiltshire, and Helena, Marchioness of Northampton. The barony and baronetcy became extinct on the death of the second Baron in September 1712.

== Barons Gorges of Dundalk (1620) ==
- Edward Gorges, 1st Baron Gorges of Dundalk (c. 1582 – c. 1650)
- Richard Gorges, 2nd Baron Gorges of Dundalk (1622 – September 1712)

== See also ==
- Gorges-Meredyth baronets

Baronetage of England
Preceded by Mohun baronets	Gorges baronets 25 November 1611	Succeeded by Puckering baronets
