= Henry Howard, 2nd Viscount Howard of Bindon =

British aristocrat and courtier (c.1542–1590)

- 2nd Viscount Howard of Bindon
- Tenure: 1582-1590
- Predecessor: Thomas Howard, 1st Viscount Howard of Bindon
- Successor: Thomas Howard, 3rd Viscount Howard of Bindon
- Born: c. 1542
- Died: 1590
- Noble family: Howard family
- Father: Thomas Howard, 1st Viscount Howard of Bindon
- Mother: Elizabeth Marney

Henry Howard, 2nd Viscount Bindon (c. 1542 - 1590), was an English aristocrat and courtier during the reign of Queen Elizabeth I.

Henry Howard was the son of Thomas Howard, 1st Viscount Howard of Bindon and Elizabeth Marney, daughter of John Marney, 2nd Baron Marney of Layer Marney and Christian Newburgh.

Howard married Frances Meautys, daughter of Peter Meutas and Jane Meutas.

Their daughter Douglas Howard married Sir Arthur Gorges in 1584. Howard had mental health problems, and was in prison at the time of his daughter's marriage.

Mark Girouard suggests that Howard started building Lulworth Castle in Dorset, which his younger brother Thomas Howard, 3rd Viscount Howard of Bindon was completing in 1607.

Peerage of England
Preceded by Thomas Howard	Viscount Howard of Bindon; 1582–1590	Succeeded by Thomas Howard
