= Custos Rotulorum of Dorset =

This is a list of people who have served as Custos Rotulorum of Dorset.

- Sir Thomas Arundell bef. 1547–1552
- Thomas Howard, 1st Viscount Howard of Bindon bef. 1558–1582
- Sir Matthew Arundell bef. 1584–1598
- Sir Walter Raleigh 1599–1603?
- Thomas Howard, 3rd Viscount Howard of Bindon bef. 1605–1611
- Theophilus Howard, Lord Howard de Walden bef. 1621–1640
- Francis Cottington, 1st Baron Cottington 1640–1652
- Denzil Holles, 1st Baron Holles 1641–1680 jointly with
- John Digby, 1st Earl of Bristol 1642–1653
- John Digby, 3rd Earl of Bristol 1680–1698

For later custodes rotulorum, see Lord Lieutenant of Dorset.
