= Thomas Gorges =

English knight and courtier

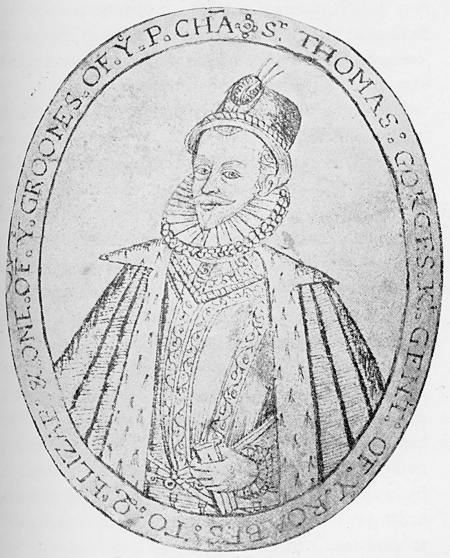
Portrait circumscribed S(i)r Thomas Gorges, K(nigh)t, Gent(leman) of ye Roabes to Q(ueen) Elizab(eth) & one of ye Groomes of ye P(rivy) Cha(mber)

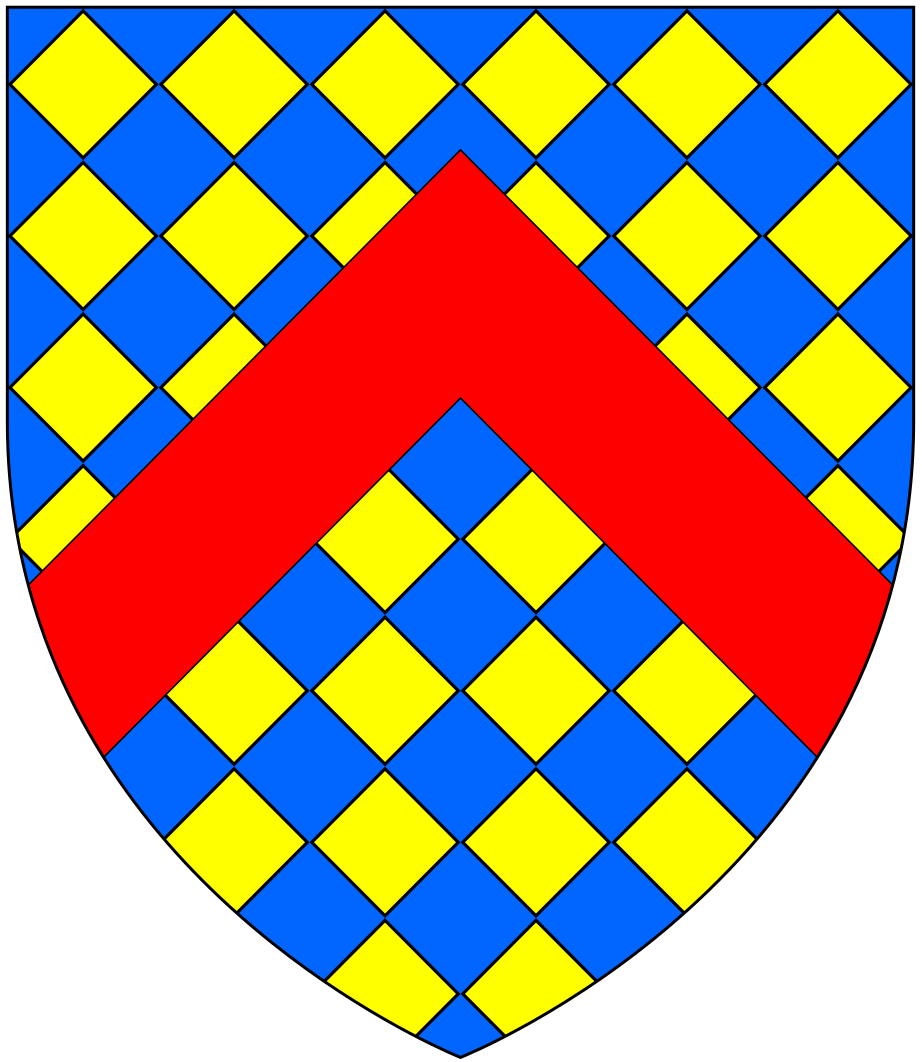
Arms of Gorges (modern): Lozengy or and azure, a chevron gules. For the history of these arms see Warbelton v. Gorges

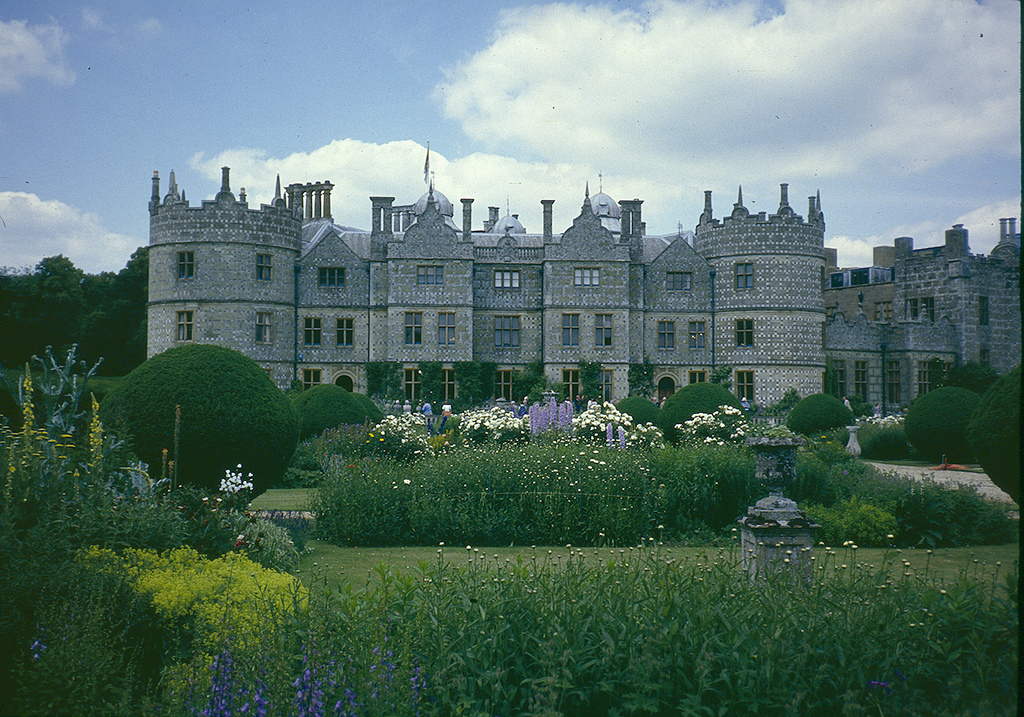
Longford Castle in Wiltshire, built by Sir Thomas Gorges and displaying in its design the influence of his Swedish wife

Sir Thomas Gorges (1536 – 30 March 1610) of Longford Castle in Wiltshire, was a courtier and Groom of the Chamber to Queen Elizabeth I. Via his great-grandmother Lady Anne Howard, a daughter of John Howard, 1st Duke of Norfolk, he was a second cousin of both Queens Anne Boleyn and Catherine Howard, the second and fifth wives of King Henry VIII. In 1586 he was elected as a Member of Parliament for Downton in Wiltshire.

== Origins ==
He was born in Wraxall, Somerset, the son of Sir Edward Gorges of Wraxall, by either his first or second wife, namely Mary Newton or Mary Poyntz (sister of Nicholas Poyntz (d.1557)), respectively. His nephew was the poet and translator Arthur Gorges. He was descended in the male line from Sir John Russell (died c. 1224) of Kingston Russell in Dorset, a household knight of King John (1199–1216). Ralph Gorges, 2nd Baron Gorges (d.1330/1), who died without issue, was keen to see his family name and armorials continue, and formed the plan of bequeathing the Gorges estates to a younger son of his sister Eleanor Gorges (by her husband Theobald Russell I (1303–1340) of Kingston Russell) on condition that he should adopt the name and arms of Gorges. Eleanor's third son, Theobald Russell II, accordingly adopted the surname Gorges and founded a revived Gorges line, which flourished, based at Wraxall, Somerset.

== Career ==
Gorges was serving as Governor of Hurst Castle in Hampshire when, during the Spanish Armada of 1588, one of the Spanish treasure ships laden with silver was driven aground nearby. Lady Gorges was granted ownership of the wreck by Queen Elizabeth I, following her request.

He was knighted at Beddington in 1586. In August 1586, Francis Walsingham sent him to Chartley to help take Mary, Queen of Scots, to Tixall and arrest her secretaries Gilbert Curle and Claude Nau. Gorges also assisted in the move to Fotheringhay.

During the reign of James I, Gorges and his wife were granted the offices of Keeper of Richmond Palace in Surrey), Keeper of the Wardrobe (responsible for the vessels and provisions there), and Keeper of the Gardens and of Richmond Park. By letters patent under the Privy Seal, Lady Gorges was granted an annual allowance of £245 5s.

== Marriage and issue ==
In 1576 he married Helena Snakenborg, dowager Marchioness of Northampton, the widow of William Parr, 1st Marquess of Northampton (1513–1571), KG, the only brother of Queen Catherine Parr, the sixth and final wife and widow of Henry VIII. Parr died without issue. She was a daughter of Ulf Henrikson von Snakenborg of Ostergottland, Sweden. She was First Lady of the Privy Chamber to Elizabeth I, and had come to England from Sweden in 1565 in the train of Cecilia, Margravine of Baden. By his wife he had issue including:

=== Sons ===
- Francis Gorges (c.1579-1599), eldest son, who predeceased his father
- Edward Gorges, 1st Baron Gorges (1582/3–1652) of Dundalk
- Sir Theobald Gorges (1583–1647), Member of Parliament
- Robert Gorges (c.1589–1648), of Redlynch, Somerset, a Member of Parliament; the daughter and heiress of his grandson Poyntz Gorges was Agnes Gorges, heiress of Redlynch, who married her cousin Robert Phelips MP.
- Thomas Gorges (1589–post 1624).

=== Daughters ===
- Elizabeth Gorges (1578–1659), who married firstly Sir Hugh Smythe of Long Ashton in Somerset and secondly on 28 Sep 1629 to her relative the colonial entrepreneur Sir Ferdinando Gorges
- Frances Gorges (1580–1649), who in about 1610 married Thomas Tyringham of Little Langford, Wiltshire
- Bridget Gorges (1584-c1634), who married Sir Robert Phelips MP.

== Longford Castle ==
In 1573 Gorges acquired the manor of Langford (now Longford Castle) in Wiltshire. With the artistic direction of his wife he built the surviving Longford Castle on the banks of the River Avon, to the south of the city of Salisbury, a triangular Swedish pattern castle with a round tower in each corner, with deer park, fruit garden and kitchen garden.

== Death, burial and monument ==
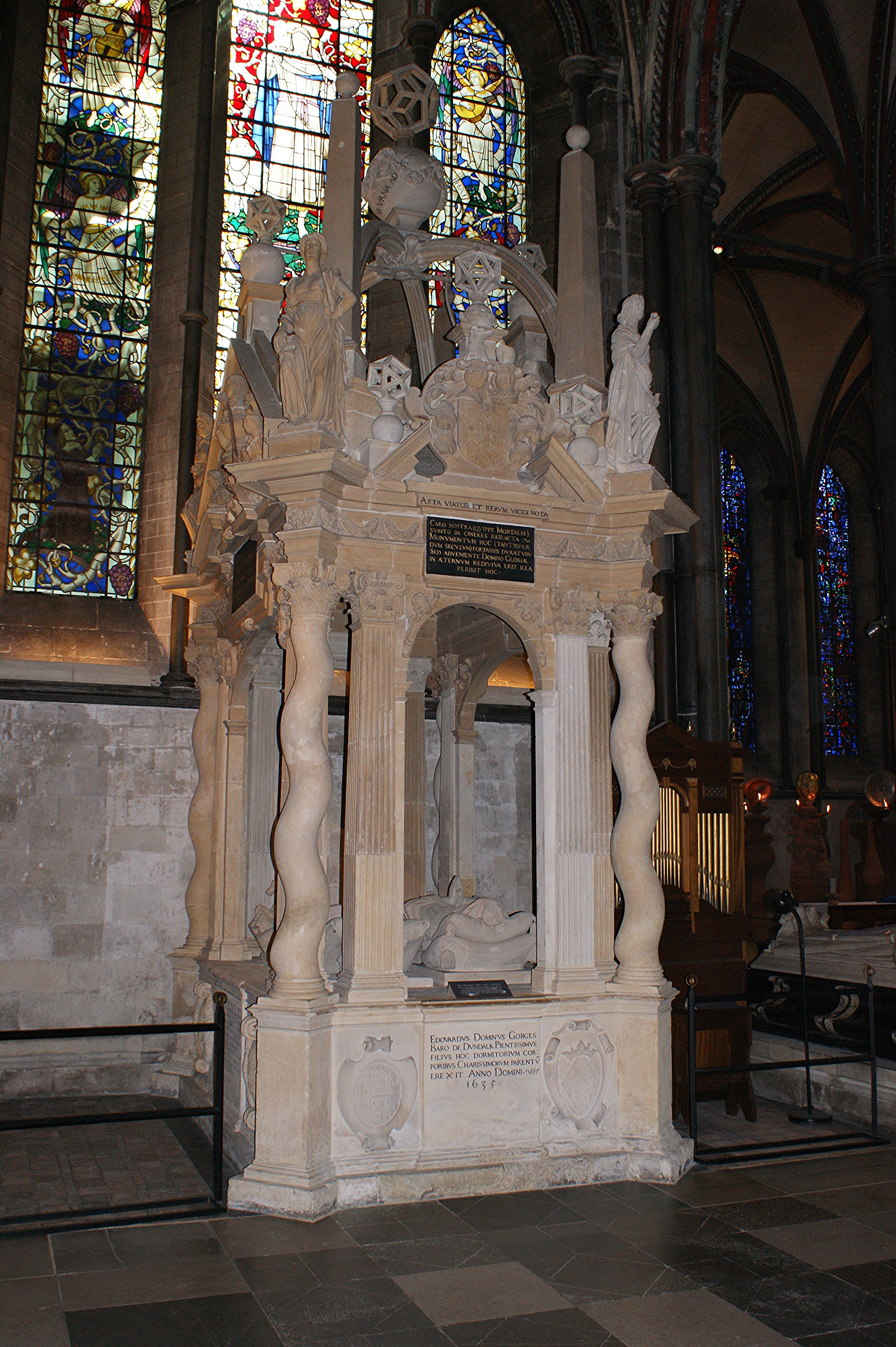
Monument and effigies in Salisbury Cathedral of Sir Thomas Gorges and his wife Helena Snakenborg

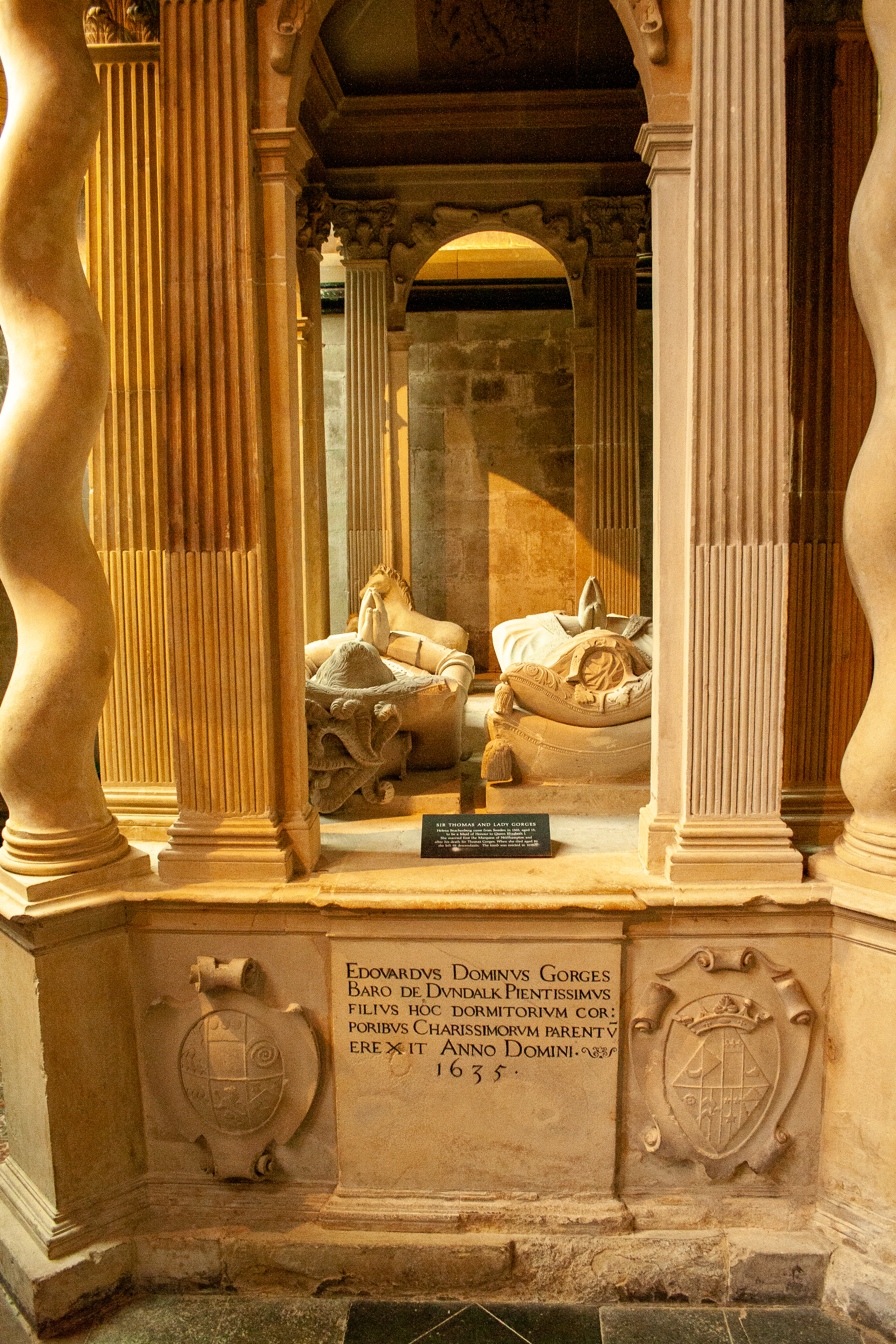
Monument in Salisbury Cathedral of Helena Snakenborg and her second husband Sir Thomas Gorges. Erected after her death in 1635

He was buried in Salisbury Cathedral, where survives (at the east end of the north choir aisle, on the north side of the Lady Chapel) his magnificent monument with recumbent effigies of himself and his wife, erected in 1635 by his son Edward Gorges, 1st Baron Gorges, after the death of his widow. The sides of the elaborate canopy above the effigies, supported on four Solomonic columns, display sculpted framework polyhedra, including two cuboctahedra and an icosahedron, and the canopy is topped by a celestial globe surmounted by a dodecahedron. These devices are possibly a reference to Leonardo da Vinci's drawings for Luca Pacioli (Divina Proportione, Paganini, Venice, 1509), ultimately based on Plato's Timaeus in which each of the regular polyhedra (or five regular solids) are assigned to the atomic structure of one of the five elements, with the dodecahedron representing the whole celestial sphere. Similar Platonic geometric symbolism survives on the contemporary monument to Sir Anthony Ashley (1551–1627/8, Clerk to the Privy Council) at nearby Wimborne St Giles, erected by his son-in-law Anthony Ashley-Cooper, 1st Earl of Shaftesbury (1621–1683). "All the known examples of these polyhedral sculptures originate within a period of about 30 years, during which England and the rest of Europe saw a resurgence of interest in quasi-mystical geometric symbolism". The design possibly refers to the science of navigation, in which both commemorated men were proficient.
