= Peter Meutas =

English courtier and soldier

Peter Meutas or Mewtas, or Mewtis, or Meautis, or Meautys (died 1562) was an English courtier and soldier.

== Family background ==
Peter Meutas was a grandson of Henry VII's French secretary John Meutas. The house of John Meutas in Lime Street, London, according to John Stow, was ruined during the Evil May Day riot in 1517. He is mentioned in John Skelton's Speke, Parrot. Peter's parents were Philip Meutas and Elizabeth Foxley.

== Courtier ==
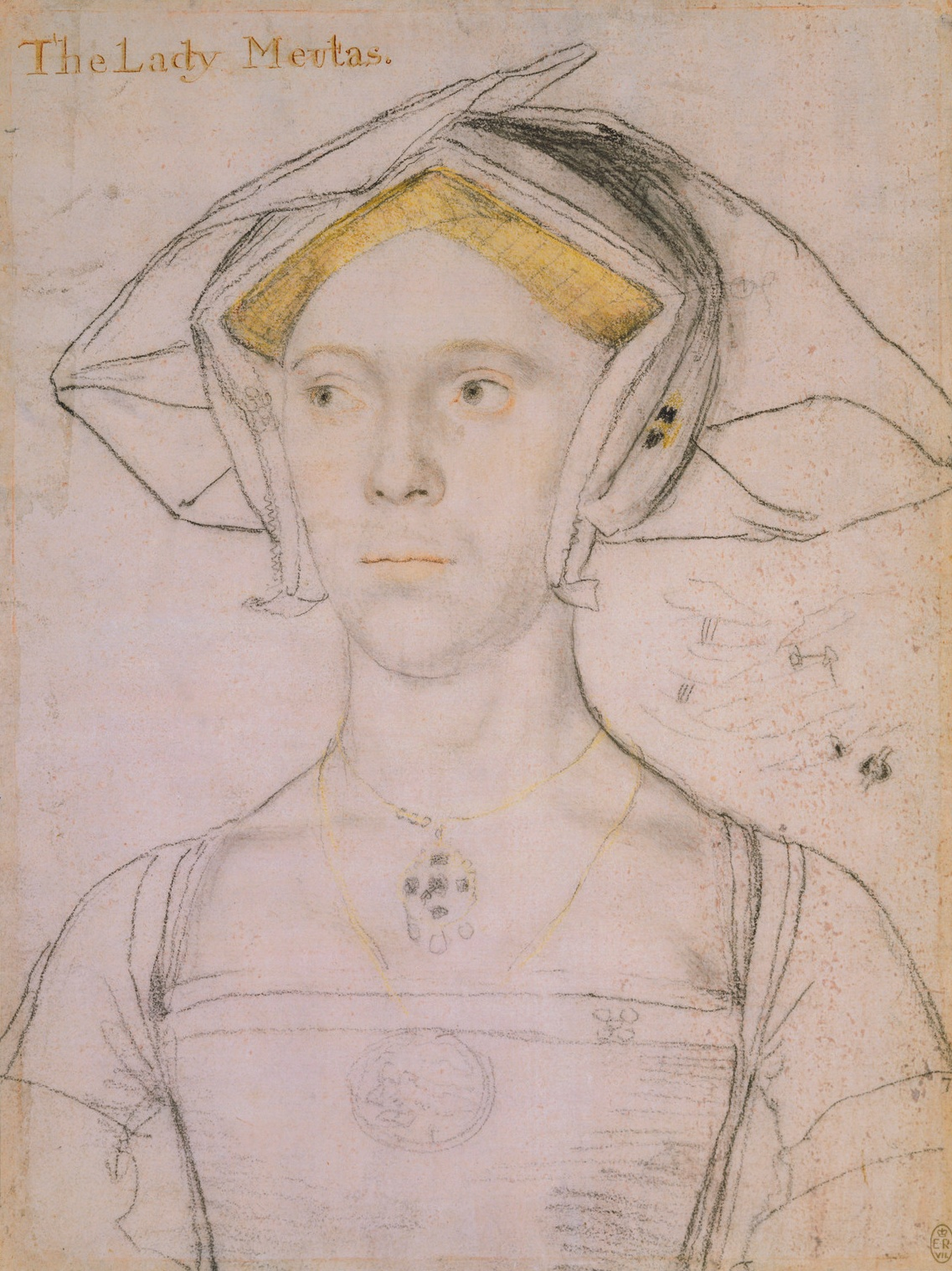
Jane Meutas by Hans Holbein

At the court of Henry VIII, he was a gentleman of the Privy Chamber and became an expert in handguns. He was said to be tall and strongly built, with a long well-trimmed beard. Meutas received a salary as a "Gentleman Usher", and was given a pay rise at Christmas 1538. Meutas and other courtiers formed the Fraternity of Saint George, a group dedicated to archery and hand guns said to be a forerunner of the Honourable Artillery Company.

According to Elizabeth Darrell, Henry VIII sent him to assassinate Cardinal Pole in 1537. He may have been in a group of 30 "richly apparelled" gentlemen of the king's household who met Anne of Cleves at Calais in December 1539, and he and his wife were listed in the royal retinue appointed to meet her at Dover. Meutas spoke French well, and was a spy in Normandy in 1546.

== Duchess of Longueville ==
In February 1538, Thomas Cromwell sent him to meet Mary of Guise, the dowager Duchess of Longueville, to ask for her portrait, "truly made, and like unto her". Henry VIII was considering marrying her, and apparently encouraged by Meutas's report, sent Philip Hoby and Hans Holbein the younger to make a portrait. It has been suggested that Meutas may have obtained a portrait of Mary of Guise by her artist Pierre Quesnel, and Holbein painted portraits of her younger sisters. Francis I insisted she marry James V of Scotland.

In 1539 Henry VIII gave Meutas and his wife the site of the monastery at Westham with Richard's Chapel, known as Stratford Langthorne Abbey, in Essex. A wall on the embankment of the Bow Back Rivers at the site was known as "Mewtas's Wall". Henry gave them the nearby manor of Bretts in 1540.

== Rough Wooing ==
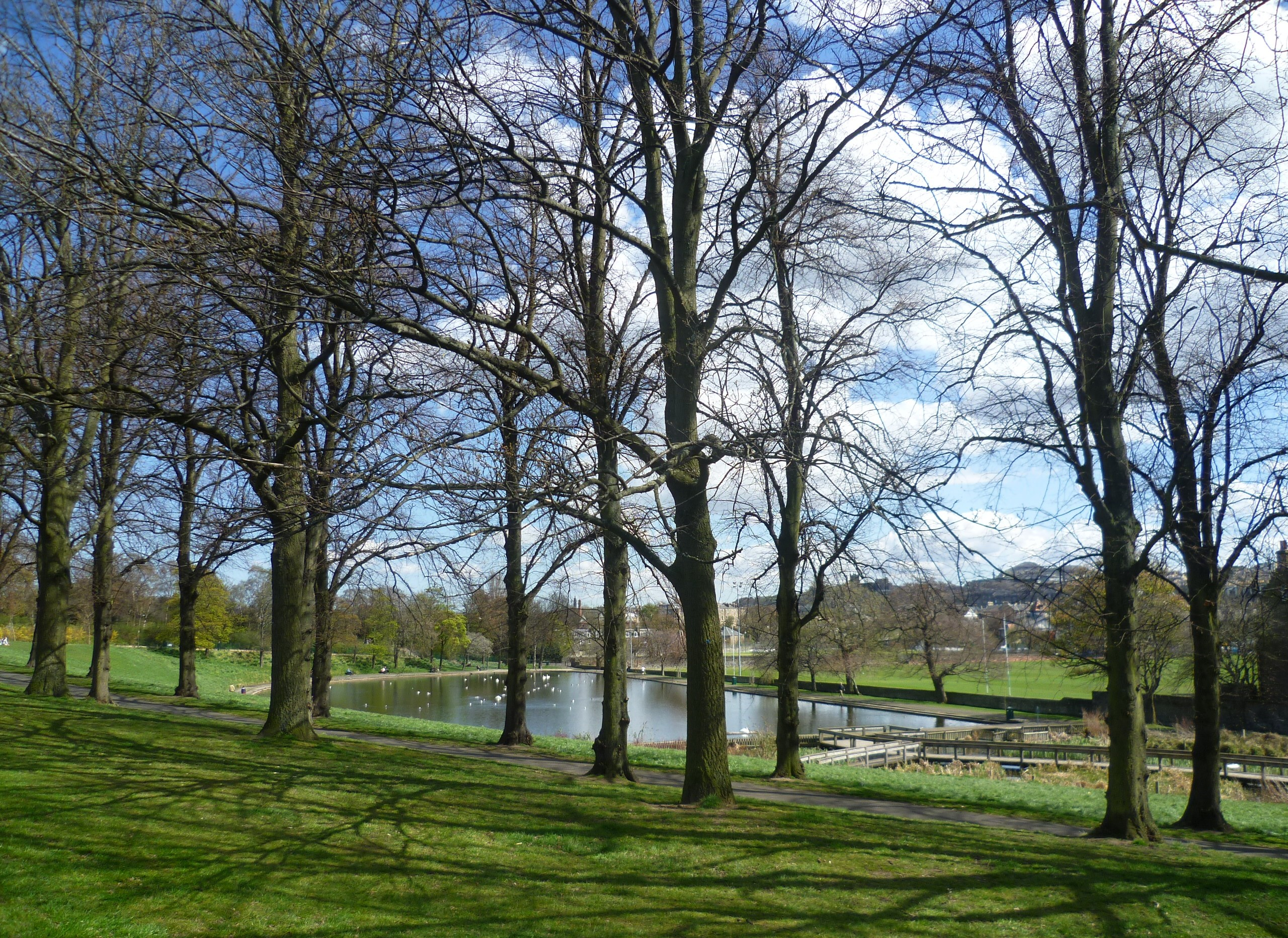
Peter Meutas deployed handguns called "hagbutts" against a Scottish army at Inverleith

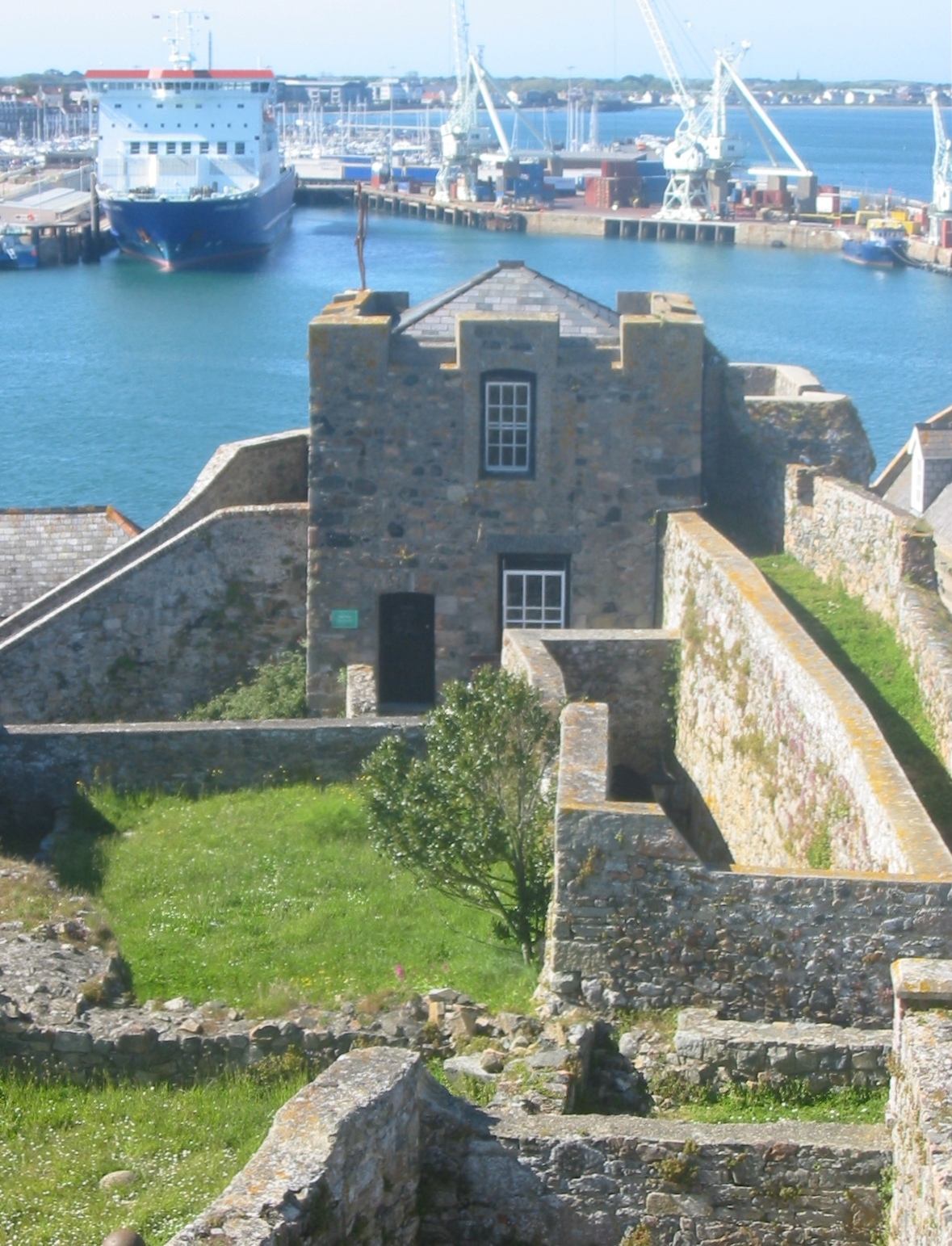
Peter Meutas was governor of Castle Cornet in Guernsey during refortification for artillery

Peter Meutas led a band of "hagbutters" at the Burning of Edinburgh in May 1544, the first major action of the war now known as the Rough Wooing. The English army landed near Granton and marched towards Leith. Their route involved crossing the Water of Leith near Inverleith, where a large Scottish force put up an opposition. There were as many as 500 hagbutters in total, divided into a vanguard, battle, and rearward, and Meutas's men and others captured the Scottish artillery. One of the Scottish leaders, Cardinal Beaton stayed on the field until he was in range of the handguns. English observers reported he was wearing a frock of yellow velvet, cut and pulled out with white tinselled sarcenet. The English commander, Lord Hertford described this battle as a half-hour fight, "right sharply handled on both parts", with Peter Meutas's hagbutters giving "right honest service". Hertford knighted Meutas on Sunday 18 May 1544 at "Butterdean", near Coldingham.

Meutas was to be sent to France in June 1544 with 500 arquebusiers, and he requested that two petty-captains Walter Urbes and Robert Crache, who had been with him in Edinburgh, should serve with him again. However, in August, Meutas sailed from Bristol in an attempt to install Matthew Stewart, 4th Earl of Lennox in Dumbarton Castle. Catherine Parr, acting as Regent of England, sent notice of their orders to Henry VIII. They captured the islands of Arran and Bute with Rothesay Castle, but were unsuccessful at Dunbarton. Meutas and Thomas Bishop brought news of this setback to Catherine Parr and the council at Woking Palace on 19 September and were directed to Henry VIII at Boulogne. Henry sent Meutas back to Woking with orders to recall the army from Scotland to join him in France.

On 26 March 1545 Meutas was appointed Governor of Guernsey and Castle Cornet. He held this position until 1553. Meutas organised the building of some fortifications, employing the military engineer John Rogers, and a tower at Castle Cornet was known as the "Mewtis Bulwark". A cannon, described as a brass saker, carries an inscription that Thomas Owen made the piece for Guernsey when Meutas was governor. In February 1547 he was sent to France to give notification of the death of Henry VIII.

In September 1547, Meutas was in Scotland again, involved in the short sieges of Thornton Castle and Innerwick Castle before the battle of Pinkie. Thornton was held by Tom Trotter for George Home, 4th Lord Home. Four English cannons bombarded Thornton while foot soldiers with hand guns directed by Peter Meutas prevented the defenders shooting from the gunloops. Thornton's garrison surrendered to Miles Partridge and the castle was demolished with gunpowder. At Innerwick, Meutas's troops fought their way into a basement and set the castle on fire. His foot soldiers armed with "hacquebuttes" fought at Pinkie.

== Mary I ==
In 1555, during the reign of Mary I of England, a former servant to Meutas, William Featherstone, pretended to be Edward VI and was executed. His motives are unknown. Meutas himself was not a supporter of Mary I, his Guernsey offices were given to Sir Leonard Chamberlain and Meutas was imprisoned in 1555 in the Fleet.

== Mary, Queen of Scots ==
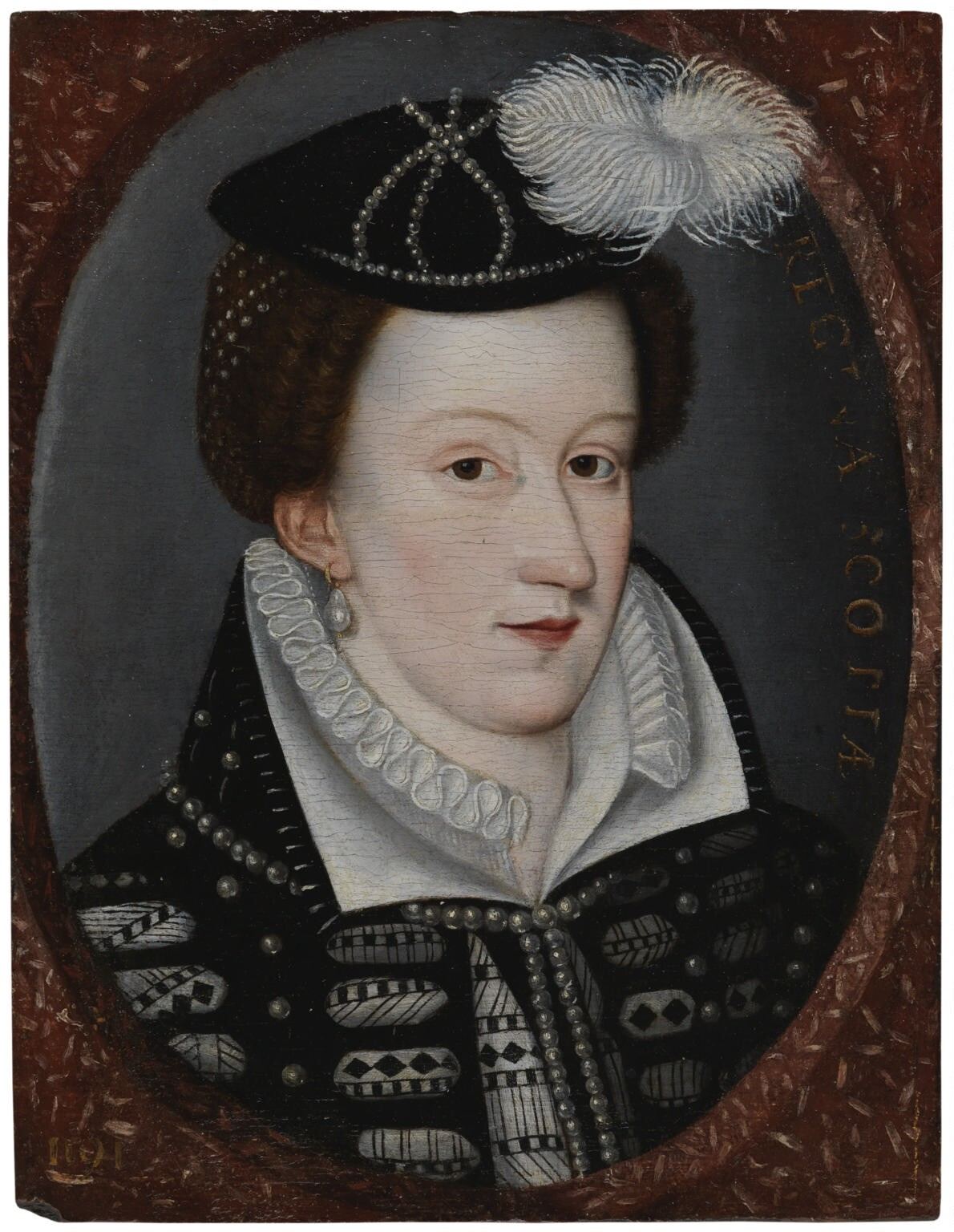
Mary, Queen of Scots, trusted Meutas as a diplomat in a sensitive negotiation.

In August, 1559, Matthew Stewart, 4th Earl of Lennox, recommended Meutas to Elizabeth I as "a fytte manne", suitable to perform diplomatic duties in France, acceptable to the French court, and also able to promote the Protestant religion. Elizabeth I sent Meutas to France with her condolences on the death of Henry II. In Paris, Meutas and Nicholas Throckmorton were served dinner on plates engraved with heraldry claiming the title of Mary, Queen of Scots, to the English throne.

Meutas brought letters from Elizabeth I to Mary in October 1561, soon after her return to Scotland from France. He was instructed to declare Elizabeth's "contentment" at Mary's "prosperous journey".

According to French ambassador, Michel de Seure, Meutas was delayed by an illness during the journey. Meutas met Mary's half-brother Lord James, James MacDonald of Dunyvaig, and the French lords who had accompanied Mary. He was involved in negotiations concerning the 1560 Treaty of Edinburgh. The issue was delicate because the ratification of the treaty encompassed the succession to the English throne. Mary had not ratified the treaty.

Meutas was a suitable ambassador, appearing to Mary to be "so good and ancient a gentlemen". Mary gave him a gold chain made by James Mosman worth £400 Scots. Meutas returned to London with a letter from William Maitland of Lethington, which argued that Henry VIII would never have intended that the offspring of Margaret Tudor would be barred from the throne of England.

Mary was anxious to hear if the answers she gave Meutas met Elizabeth's approval. Elizabeth was not fully satisfied by the answers to her requests and Mary's refusal to ratify the treaty, as reported by Meutas, and she asked Thomas Randolph to continue the discussion. Mary seems to have told Meutas to ask Elizabeth for her painted portrait, and in January 1562 Elizabeth wrote to Mary that her painter was indisposed and sickly. A few months later, Elizabeth entrusted a portrait to Mary's secretary, William Maitland of Lethington, but the treaty was never ratified.

He was sent with Henry Sidney in an embassy to Paris in 1562. Peter Meutas died in Dieppe in September 1562.

== Family and marriages ==
Peter Meutas married, firstly, Jane Ashley who died around the year 1551, and secondly, Jane (died 1577). His children included:

- Henry Meutas (1526-1588), who married Ann Jermy, daughter of Sir John Jermy of Metfield and Brightwell, Suffolk.
- Thomas Meutas.
- Hercules Meutas, who married Phillipa, daughter of Richard Cooke (1531-1579) of Gidea Hall. Their daughter was Jane Cornwallis.
- Frances Meautas, a Maid of Honour to Elizabeth I, who married (1) Henry Howard, 2nd Viscount Howard of Bindon, (2) Edmund Stansfield.

The will of the second Jane Meutas includes bequests to Hercules Meutas, whom she calls her son-in-law.
