= Thomas Howard, 1st Viscount Howard of Bindon =

English politician

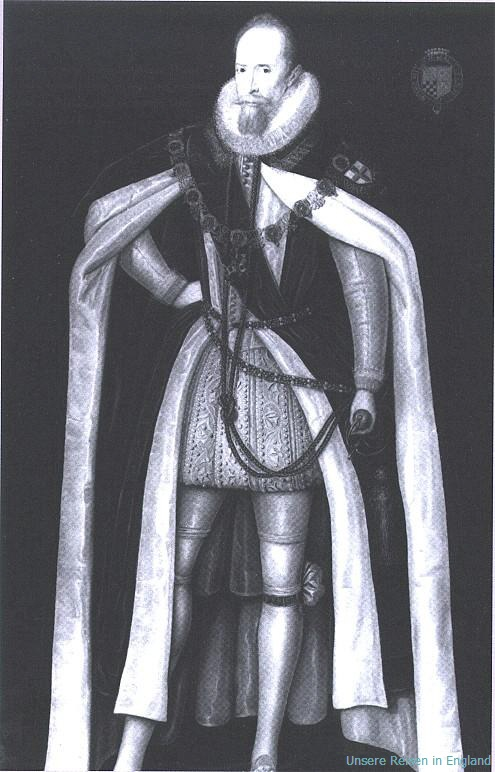
Thomas Howard, 1st Viscount Howard of Bindon. Portrait attributed to Robert Peake. c. 1560s

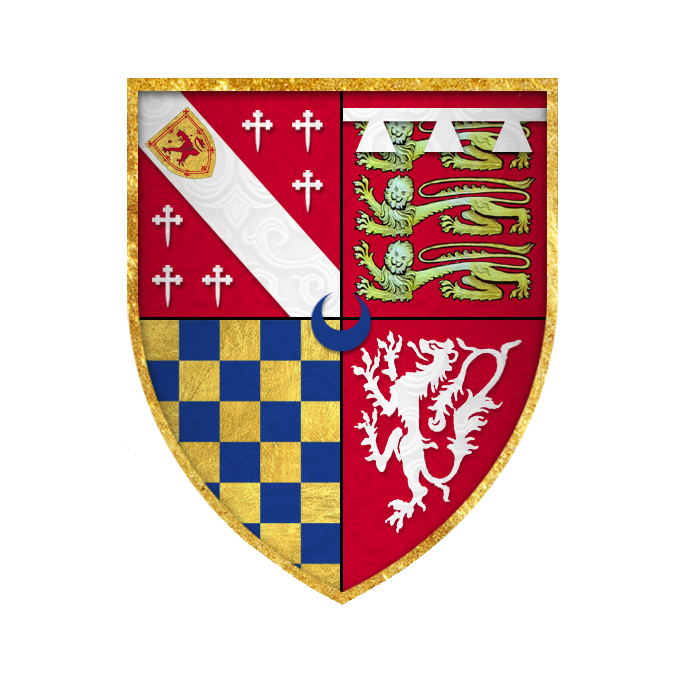
Coat of Arms of Thomas Howard, 1st Viscount Howard of Bindon

Thomas Howard, 1st Viscount Howard of Bindon (c. 1520 – 1582) was an English peer and politician.

== Life ==
He was the younger son of Thomas Howard, 3rd Duke of Norfolk and Lady Elizabeth Stafford. In 1526 his father acquired the wardship of Elizabeth Marney, daughter and co-heir of John Marney, 2nd Baron Marney and three years later purchased the right of her marriage from the master of the king's wards. The marriage of Thomas and Elizabeth took place at Norfolk House, Lambeth on 14 May 1533. Through this marriage Thomas acquired a number of manors in Dorset.

In late 1546, both his father and his elder brother Henry, Earl of Surrey were arrested for high treason, mainly because Surrey had quartered the royal arms of Edward the Confessor on his own coat of arms, which King Henry VIII interpreted as an attempt by the Howards to usurp the crown of his son and heir, Prince Edward. As a result of the fall of his father and brother, Thomas lost his status as a peer. Both the Norfolk and Surrey were tried for high treason and sentenced to death. Only Surrey went to the scaffold, being executed on 19 January, 1547. The execution of their father, scheduled for 28 January, did not take place because Henry VIII died in the early hours of that same day. Thomas was granted a general pardon and was restored to the rank of baron by the new King Edward VI. His father remained a prisoner in the Tower of London, where Thomas was allowed to visit him in April 1551. The elderly 3rd Duke was released and pardoned shortly after the accession of the Roman Catholic Queen Mary I in July 1553.

He served as Custos Rotulorum of Dorset and Vice-Admiral of Dorset. In the latter role he was ineffective in putting down piracy, in which his kinsman Sir Richard Rogers of Bryanston was directly involved. On 13 January 1559, he was raised to the peerage as Viscount Howard of Bindon by Elizabeth I. He took his title from Bindon Abbey in Dorset, which he had acquired with other property from the death of Thomas Poynings, 1st Baron Poynings and his wife Katherine without an heir. In the 1560s he further extended his estate in Dorset by acquiring Buckland Newton, Cattistock and Marnhull from Robert Dudley, 1st Earl of Leicester.

In Elizabeth's reign he apparently adopted a position of outward conformity, but remained under suspicion concerning his religious views. In 1562 he accompanied Bishop Jewel on the ecclesiastical Visitation of the Western diocese, but was omitted by the Privy Council from the commission set up to search for Jesuits and seminary priests in Dorset. However, he was trusted to search the house linked to the Jesuit James Bosgrave in Bere Regis. In 1573 he had prevented John Stourton, 9th Baron Stourton from going abroad for religious reasons. Despite the execution of his nephew Thomas Howard, 4th Duke of Norfolk for treason, Thomas's loyalty to Elizabeth I was never called into question and until the end of his life he was charged with the defence of Dorset's coast.

In 1567 the poet George Turberville included a dedication to Thomas in a translation of Ovid.

During the last five years of his life he was engaged in a bitter feud with his son and heir Henry. He died in 1582 and was buried at Marnhull.

== Marriages and issue ==
Thomas married 4 times:

1) Elizabeth Marney, daughter and co-heir of John Marney, 2nd Baron Marney (first wife):

- Henry Howard, 2nd Viscount Howard of Bindon
- Thomas Howard, 3rd Viscount Howard of Bindon
- Francis Howard
- Giles Howard (d. c. 1592)
- Grace Howard

2) Gertrude Lyte, daughter of Sir William Lyte of Lillesdon, Somerset

- Charles Howard (d. 1593) married Roberta Webbe. Their daughter Catherine married Thomas Thynne (died 1639)
- Anne Howard (d. 1633) married firstly Sir William Thornhurst(d. 1606), their son Gifford Thornhurst married Susanna Temple, and secondly in 1608 John Turberville of Woolbridge.

3) Mabel Burton, daughter of Nicholas Burton of Carshalton, Surrey:

- Frances Howard, who married as her second husband, Edward Seymour, 1st Earl of Hertford, and as her third husband, Ludovic Stewart, 2nd Duke of Lennox and 1st Duke of Richmond.

4) Margaret Manning, daughter of Henry Manning of Greenwich

Political offices
New title	Vice-Admiral of Dorset; 1551–1580	Vacant Title next held by Henry Ashley
Preceded by Sir Thomas Arundell	Custos Rotulorum of Dorset; 1552?–1582	Succeeded by Sir Matthew Arundell
Peerage of England
New creation	Viscount Howard of Bindon; 1559–1582	Succeeded by Henry Howard
