= Viscount Howard of Bindon =

Title in the Peerage of England

Viscount Howard of Bindon was a title in the Peerage of England. It was created in 1559 for Thomas Howard, second son of Thomas Howard, 3rd Duke of Norfolk. His two sons, the second and third Viscount, both succeeded him in the title. As neither had any male children, the title became extinct on the death of the third Viscount in 1611. The title referred to Bindon Abbey in Dorset.

The title is in some sources referred to as Viscount Bindon. The Bindon title was revived in 1706 when another member of the Howard family, Henry Howard, Lord Walden, was made Earl of Bindon.

== Viscounts Howard of Bindon (1559) ==
- Thomas Howard, 1st Viscount Howard of Bindon (c. 1520–1582)
- Henry Howard, 2nd Viscount Howard of Bindon (c. 1542–1590)
- Thomas Howard, 3rd Viscount Howard of Bindon (d. 1611)

== See also ==
- Duke of Norfolk
- Earl of Bindon
