= Jane Meutas =

English noble (c. 1517-c.1551)

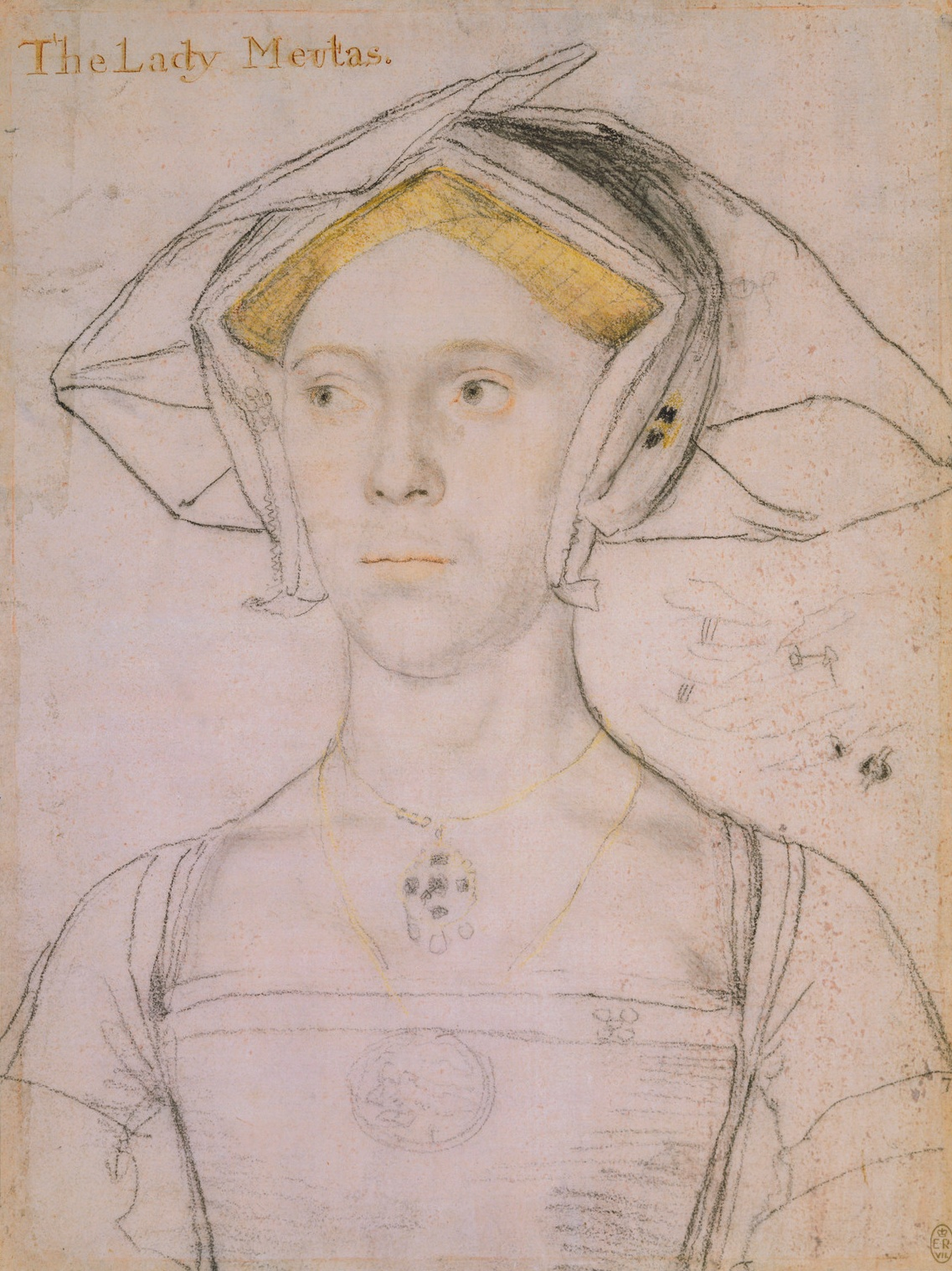
'The Lady Meutas', drawing in chalks by Holbein

Jane Meutas (or Mewtas, or Mewtis, or Meautis, or Meautys) (c. 1517 – c. 1551) was an English lady of the Queen's privy chamber who became the wife of the courtier Peter Meutas. Her name is sometimes given as Joan, and her maiden name was Astley or Ashley. Her husband was knighted on 18 May 1544, when she became Lady Meutas. She is the subject of a portrait sketch by Hans Holbein the Younger which is believed to date from the 1530s and is in the Royal Collection.

== Life ==
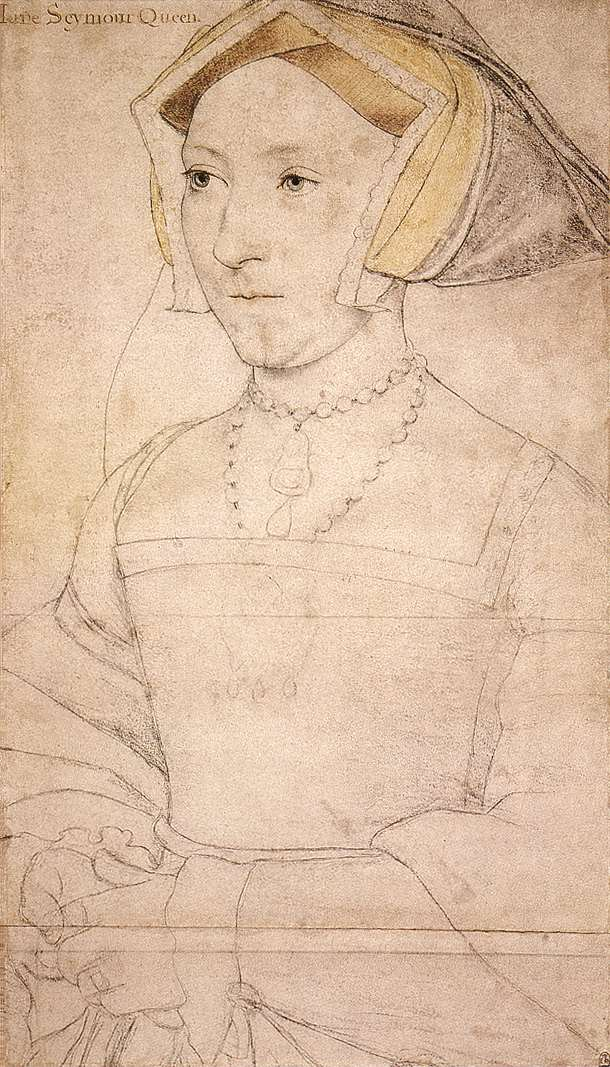
Queen Jane Seymour, drawn by Holbein, c. 1536-1537

Jane Astley, a lady of the privy chamber of Queen Jane Seymour, married her fellow courtier Peter Meutas in 1537, before 9 October. He was a man of action, tall, strong, an expert in small arms, with fair hair and a long beard. A follower of Thomas Cromwell, Mewtas had seen action in the suppression of the Pilgrimage of Grace of 1536 and the same year had been appointed a gentleman of the privy chamber and master of Bethlem Hospital. In 1537, he gained two further preferments, as Comptroller of the Royal Mint and Overseer of Artillery.

The couple had a child who was baptized in February 1539. This was probably their son Henry, or perhaps their daughter Frances, who later became a gentlewoman of the chamber to Queen Elizabeth I and married Henry, second Viscount Howard of Bindon. Jane and Peter Mewtas had at least two other sons, Thomas and Hercules, of whom Hercules was their youngest.

In 1539, after the dissolution of Stratford Abbey, Peter Mewtas and his wife acquired a large estate at West Ham in Essex. In 1540, they were granted the manor of Bretts, also at West Ham, which centred on Plaistow but included tenements at Upton, Stratford, and elsewhere.

In August 1540 Jane Meutas and others ladies of the court visited Portsmouth to see a newly built ship. They sent Henry VIII a joint letter which was signed by Mabel, Lady Southampton, Margaret Tallebois, Margaret Howard (sister of Catherine Howard), Alice Browne, Anne Knyvett (daughter of Thomas Knyvett), Jane Denny, "Jane Meowes", Anne Bassett, Elizabeth Tyrwhitt, and Elizabeth Harvey.

Peter Mewtas was one of the dignitaries who met Anne of Cleves at Calais in 1540 and was knighted on active military service on 18 May 1544 at Edinburgh. In 1545, he was appointed Governor of Guernsey, where his works at Castle Cornet included the building of the new 'Mewtas Bulwark'.

No record of the date of Jane Meutas's death has been traced. By 1552, Sir Peter Mewtas had married another Jane, who may have been Jane Angersley. The second Jane survived her husband, who died in 1562, and she was still holding the manor of Bretts in 1567. She died in 1577.

== Family ==
After the death of Jane Meutas, Peter Meutas married another woman called Jane (died 1577). Peter's children (by both wives) included

- Henry Meautys (1526-1588), who married Ann Jermy, daughter of Sir John Jermy of Metfield and Brightwell, Suffolk, their children included Thomas Meautys (father of the civil servant and politician Thomas Meautys), and Margaret Meautys, who married Sir Thomas Wilson.
- Thomas Meautys.
- Hercules Meautys, who married Phillipa, daughter of Richard Cooke (1531-1579) of Gildea Hall.
- Frances Meautys, a Maid of Honour to Queen Elizabeth, she married (1) Henry Howard, 2nd Viscount Howard of Bindon, (2) Edmund Stansfield.

== Drawing by Holbein ==
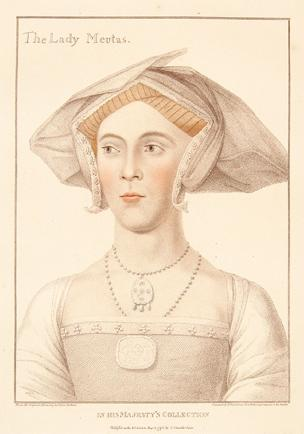
Bartolozzi's engraving

Holbein's portrait of Jane Meutas is a drawing in black and coloured chalks on pink prepared paper, 283 x 212 mm, and has the name 'The Lady Meutas' written clearly on its face. To the right of the head, Holbein has added a schematic sketch of his sitter's hands. On one finger is a heart-shaped leaf which German painters of the time used as a symbol for the colour green, taken to represent an emerald ring. The same leaf symbol appears in Lady Meutas’s oval medallion.

The web site of the Tate Gallery gives the date of the drawing as "about 1536", and if this is correct, the words 'The Lady Meutas' must have been added some years later, as Peter Meutas was not knighted until 1544. The drawing of Jane Meutas can be compared with another by Holbein, of her royal mistress Jane Seymour, which is also in black and coloured chalks on pink paper. The two appear to have been done at the same time, and Jane Seymour died on 24 October 1537, twelve days after the birth of the future King Edward VI.

== Engraving by Bartolozzi ==
Holbein's portrait sketch of Jane Meutas was engraved by Francesco Bartolozzi in 1795 and published by John Chamberlaine of London in Imitations of Original Drawings by Hans Holbein in the Collection of His Majesty, for the Portraits of Illustrious Persons of the Court of Henry VIII. This includes with the engraving a short biography of Lady Meutas.

Bartolozzi was famous for his stipple engravings and developed his technique to imitate the subtleties of Renaissance and baroque chalk drawings.
