= Helena Snakenborg =

Swedish noblewoman

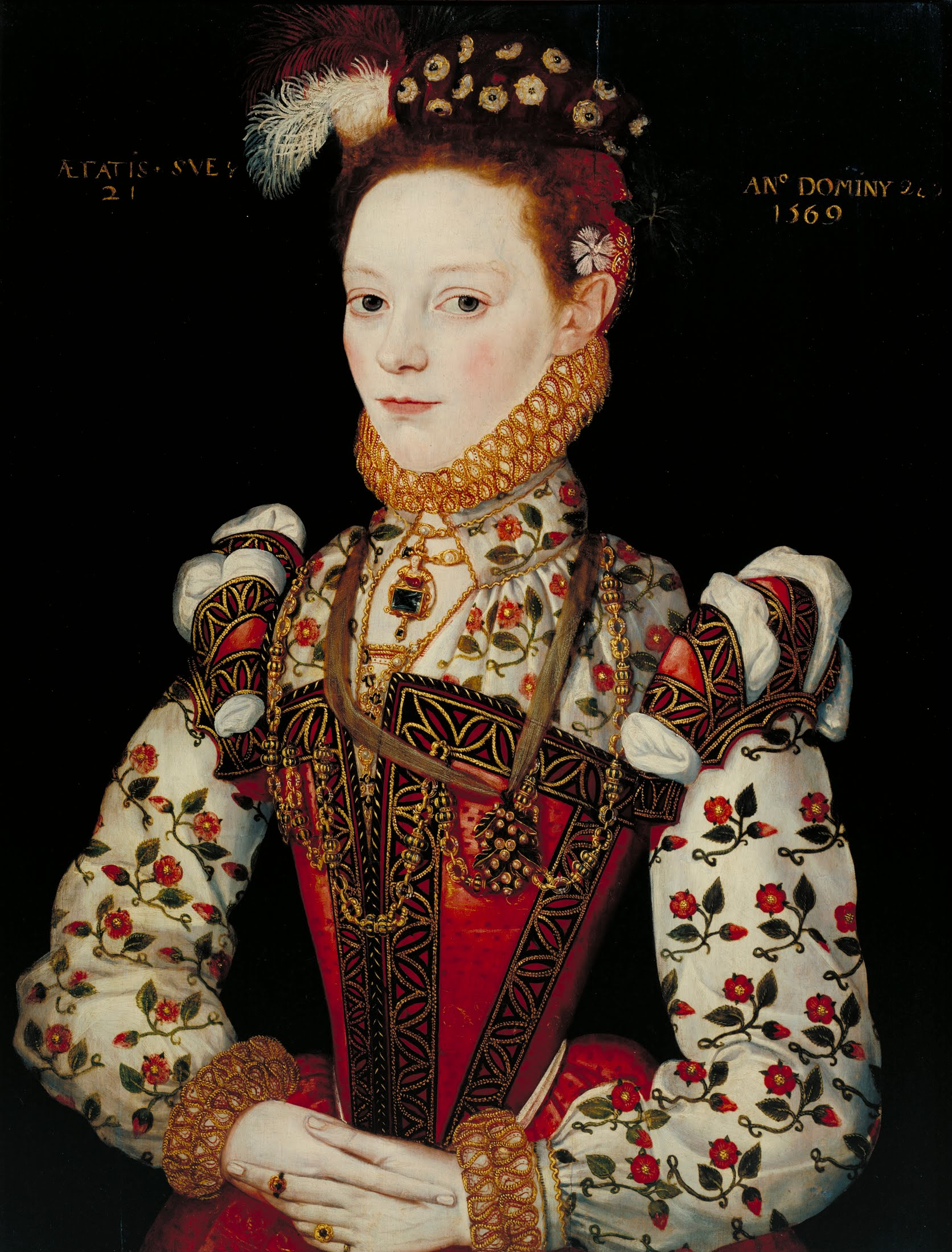
- A Young Lady Aged 21 in 1569, possibly a portrait of Helena Snakenborg
- Born: Elin Ulfsdotter of Fyllingarum c. 1548; Ostrogothia
- Died: 10 April 1635
- Spouses: William Parr, Marquess of Northampton (m. 1571; died 1571) Sir Thomas Gorges (m. 1576; died 1610)
- Children: Elizabeth Gorges; Francis Gorges; Frances Gorges; Edward Gorges, 1st Baron Gorges of Dundalk; Sir Theobald Gorges; Bridget Gorges; Robert Gorges; Thomas Gorges
- Parents: Ulf Henriksson (father); Agneta Knutsdotter (mother)

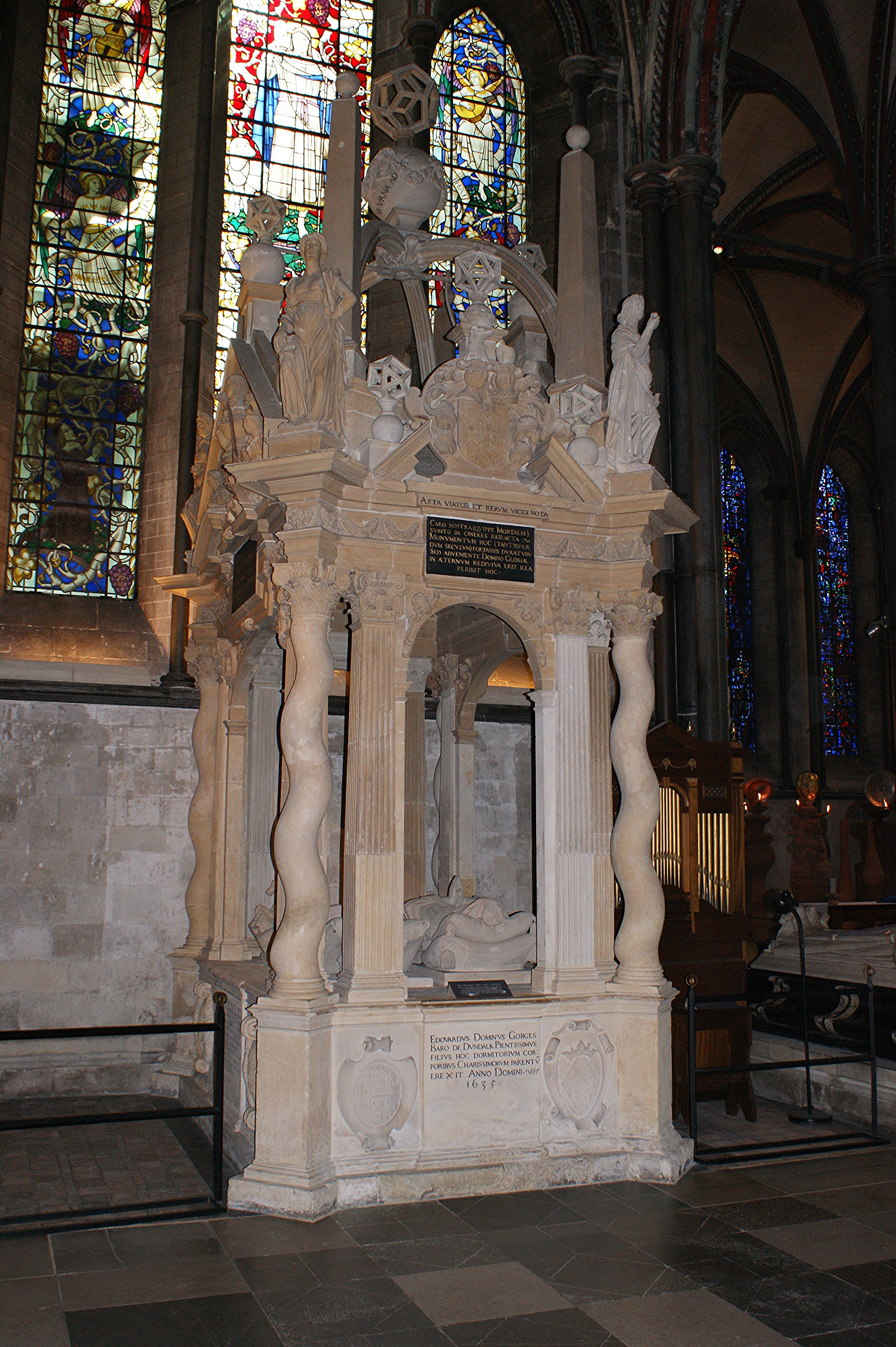
Monument and effigies in Salisbury Cathedral, Wiltshire, of Helena Snakenborg (died 1635) and her second husband Sir Thomas Gorges (1536–1610). Erected after her death in 1635

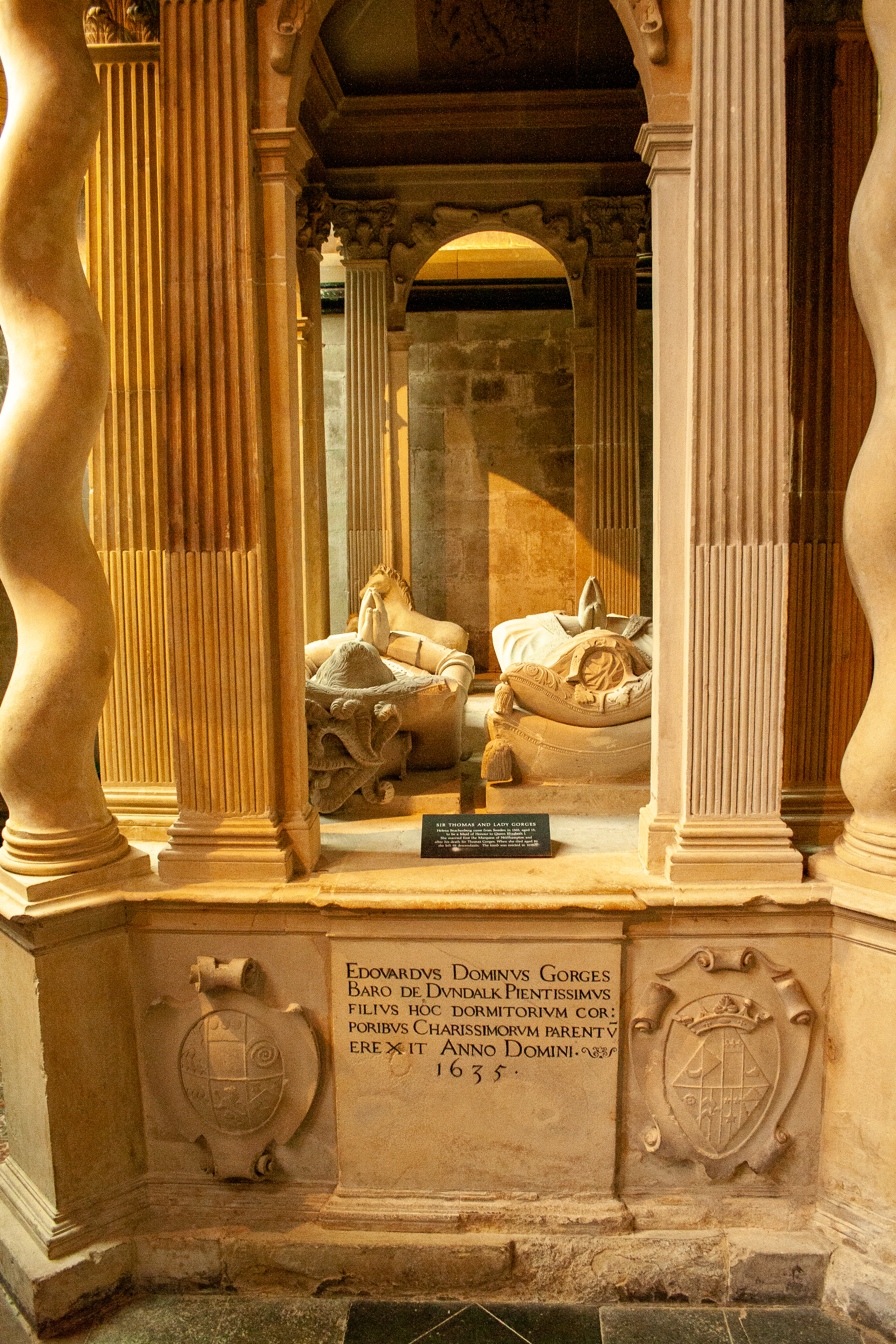
Monument in Salisbury Cathedral of Helena Snakenborg and her second husband Sir Thomas Gorges

Elin Ulfsdotter Snakenborg, Marchioness of Northampton, also known as Helena, and Helena the Red for her red hair, (1548/1549 – 10 April 1635) was a Swedish-born noblewoman, Maid of Honour of Queen Elizabeth I of England, and Marchioness of Northampton by her marriage to William Parr, 1st Marquess of Northampton.

== Family and lineage ==
She was born in Sweden, as Elin Ulfsdotter of Fyllingarum in the province of Ostrogothia, in either 1548 or 1549, as a younger daughter of Ulf Henriksson, lord of Fyllingarum (d. c. 1565), of the Bååt family, and his wife, Agneta Knutsdotter, of the Lillie af Ökna family, heiress of Norrnes. Her father was a supporter of Gustav I, king of Sweden. By all accounts, Helena was a beautiful woman, with large brown eyes, red hair, and a pink and white complexion. She was described as having a strong will and independent mind.

Helena had two brothers and three sisters who survived childhood and later had children of their own. Helena was baptized and given the name of her paternal grandmother, Elin Ulfsdotter Roos af Ervalla, of the Norwegian house of Sudreim, and her paternal grandfather's grandmother, Elin Snakenborg.

Contrary to claims presented in some genealogies, Helena's ancestry has not been proven to include medieval Viking Earls of Orkney (she was related to, but not descended from, Erengisle Sunesson, who held the title). And also contrary to claims in some genealogies, she seems not to have descended from the sister of St Bridget of Sweden. She was, however, a descendant of the statesman Birger Jarl and thus possibly a descendant of the Danish kings Sweyn I Forkbeard, Harald Bluetooth and Gorm the Old as well as European royals, including Charlemagne and Alfred the Great.

== Journey to England ==
Helena was one of six young Swedish noble ladies who were Maids of Honour in the retinue of Princess Cecilia of Sweden, Margravine of Baden, second-eldest daughter of King Gustav I. Cecilia and her retinue departed Sweden in Autumn 1564 on a voyage to England, at the invitation of Queen Elizabeth I. It was rumoured that Cecilia was journeying to England to press the suit of her half-brother King Eric XIV of Sweden to marry Queen Elizabeth.

As Denmark-Norway was hostile towards Sweden, they were forced to take a roundabout, land route. They travelled through Finland, Livonia, Poland and Germany, which was a lengthy journey, until they reached Calais. The party is also reported to have been hampered by bad weather, and the last leg by seasickness. The journey lasted almost a year until they reached their destination – they arrived on 8 September 1565 at Dover. Cecilia of Baden was at the time in her ninth month of pregnancy. Helena had become ill on the journey.

The welcoming party at Dover was led by Sir William Parr, 1st Marquess of Northampton (1513–1571), the only surviving son of Sir Thomas Parr of Kendal, and brother of the late Queen consort Catherine Parr.

== Marchioness of Northampton ==
In London, they settled at Bedford House. On their arrival many prominent members of the English nobility received the party, including Queen Elizabeth. Helena Snakenborg caught the interest of the elderly (then 52 years old) Marquess of Northampton, who soon started to court her.

Margravine Cecilia left England in April 1566 in order to escape her creditors. Helena then became one of the maids of honour to Queen Elizabeth I, and remained in the country for the rest of her life. She was promoted to gentlewoman of the royal privy chamber. She was subsequently granted many privileges, such as her own lodgings at Hampton Court Palace, servants, and a horse. A record of Elizabeth's wardrobe notes that Helena was given a French-style gown of russet velvet in February 1567. She signed her name for this gift as "Ellin Wlfs".

Lord Northampton hoped to marry Helena but there was a difficulty because his first, though divorced, wife Anne Bourchier, 7th Baroness Bourchier, was still living. They had divorced in 1552, and he had since remarried, his second wife having died in 1565; however, the Church of England did not acknowledge subsequent marriages of divorced persons until the death of the previous spouse. Anne died in 1571, and Northampton married Helena almost immediately, with the queen's approval.

The wedding took place on 6 May 1571 in Elizabeth's presence in the queen's closet at Whitehall Palace, and for the few months of their marriage, the couple divided their time between their houses in Guildford, Surrey, and at Stanstead Hall, Essex. They had no children. The marquess died suddenly on 28 October 1571, five months after the marriage. Nothampton had not yet provided Helena with a jointure, and his estate reverted (escheated) to the crown, so she was left with little financial support. Elizabeth I stepped in and paid for Northampton’s funeral. She gave Helena lands worth £400 a year and gave her a job in her privy chamber. In 1574 she was granted the manor of Hemingford Grey by the Queen.

== Second marriage ==
Helena's second husband was Thomas Gorges, of Longford, Wiltshire, a second cousin of the late Anne Boleyn, and descended from the first Howard Duke of Norfolk. The queen was originally in favour of Thomas' courtship of Helena but changed her mind and refused to consent to a marriage: Helena was a marchioness, and by marriage the Queen's kinswoman, Gorges yet only a gentleman. Helena married Thomas Gorges secretly in about 1576. When Elizabeth learned of their clandestine act, Helena was exiled from the court, and Thomas was incarcerated in The Tower of London for a brief period. However, Helena was later reinstated, possibly with the help of her influential friend, Lord Chamberlain Thomas Radcliffe, 3rd Earl of Sussex.

Helena and Thomas had eight (surviving) children. The couple's first child was born in June 1578 and named Elizabeth (1578–1659) after the queen, who stood as godmother; Elizabeth would marry twice, first Sir Hugh Smyth and second Ferdinando Gorges. Helena's first son, Francis Gorges (c.1579–1599), was allegedly named after their close friend, Sir Francis Drake. They had two more daughters, Frances Gorges (1580–1649) and Bridget Gorges (1584-c1634), and four more sons, all of whom were later knighted: Edward Gorges, first Baron Gorges of Dundalk (b 1582/3, d in or before 1652), Theobald Gorges (1583–1647), Robert Gorges (1588–1648), and Thomas Gorges (b 1589, d after 1624).

The couple had their town house at Whitefriars. Helena persuaded Thomas Gorges to rebuild his property at Longford. The mansion had been damaged by fire when he acquired it and a replacement was completed at great expense by 1591, under the final supervision of John Thorpe. Longford Castle was the model for the 'Castle of Amphialeus' in Sir Philip Sidney's Arcadia. Thomas Gorges of Longford was knighted in 1586.

Queen Elizabeth granted Helena manors in Huntingdonshire and Wiltshire. The marchioness was still highly regarded by Queen Elizabeth and often acted as her deputy at the baptism of the children of distinguished noblemen, particularly towards the end of the reign, when the queen's health was deteriorating.

In 1582, Thomas was sent as English envoy to Sweden and met Helena's family members. Helena also had continuous correspondence with relatives in Sweden, as well as the Duke Charles of Södermanland, later king Charles IX, her childhood friend.

In 1584, the queen granted the estate at Sheen to Helena and Thomas for their life. It was a former monastery directly north from the queen's chief residence, the Richmond Palace near the City of London. This meant that Thomas and Helena were able to live with their children while also serving at the Royal Court.

== Later life ==
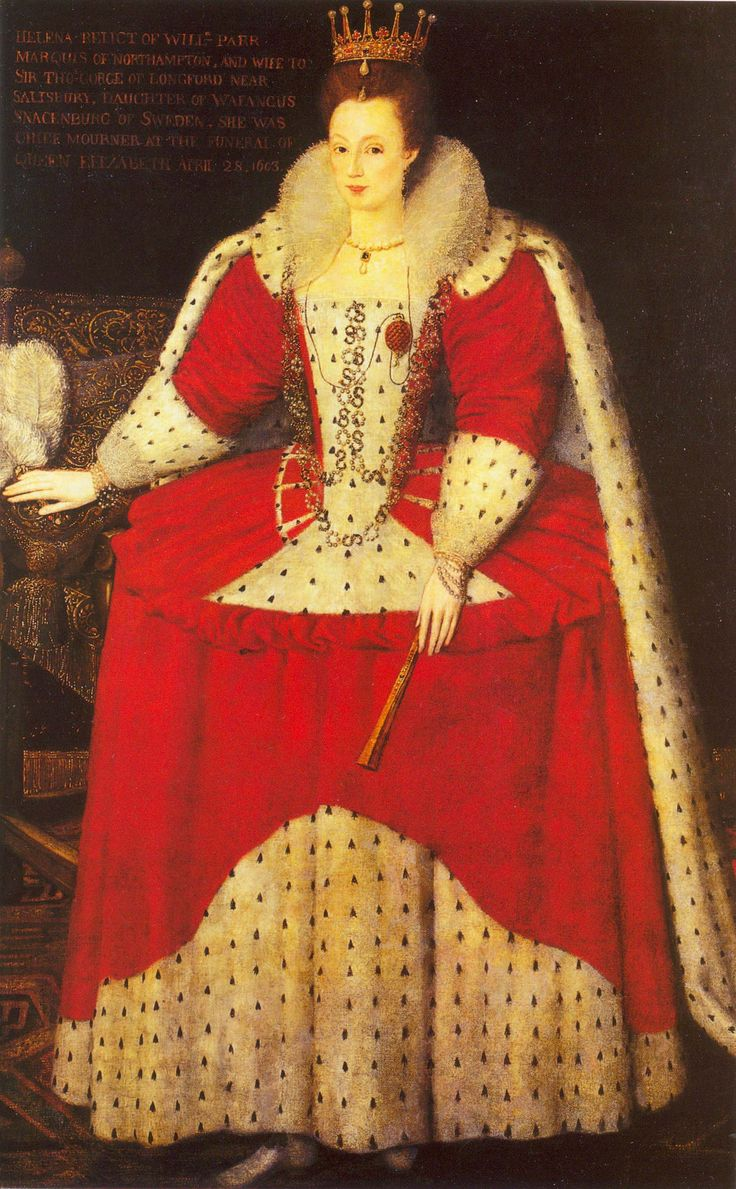
Helena Snakenborg, Marchioness of Northampton, in coronation robes, 1603.

Queen Elizabeth died in March 1603. Arbella Stuart was lodged with the Marchioness Helena at Sheen. Helena was the chief mourner in the royal funeral procession as senior peeress because Arbella Stuart refused to undertake the role and King James had not yet arrived in London. In the funeral procession, she walked close behind the Queen's coffin, supported by the Lord High Treasurer and the Lord High Admiral of England. This is mentioned as the apogee of her career. In July 1603, Helena and Thomas took part in the coronation of the new monarch, James I and his wife Anne of Denmark. Shortly afterward, they moved to Longford from plague-ridden London.

The accession of James I meant that Helena was demoted from the chamber of the new queen, Anna of Denmark. However, she served at the new Court and in other royal tasks. She was Keeper of Richmond Palace and the royal wardrobe and garden there.

Helena brokered the king's relations with Sweden; for example the Swedish attempt to have Princess Elizabeth, the king's eldest daughter, as bride for the Swedish heir, Gustav Adolf, son of Charles IX (which project was prevented by Anne of Denmark, her mother). Sir Thomas Gorges died on 30 March 1610 at the age of seventy-four, after which Marchioness Helena increasingly retreated from public life.

She reportedly remained a devoted member of the Church of England. Most of the time she resided at her house of Sheen, near the Court, but in the end retreated to Redlynch in Somerset, the manor of her son Sir Robert Gorges. Letters show that Helena had close contact with her children and grandchildren. In April 1604 she had a fashion doll dressed in the latest styles in London to send to her sister Karin in Sweden. Marchioness Helena's last preserved letter, dated 8 September 1634, to her grandson, is signed with a clearly wavering hand.

Helena died at the age of 86 on 10 April 1635 at Redlynch, and was buried on 14 May in Salisbury Cathedral. It has been claimed that Helena had no fewer than ninety-eight direct descendants at the time of her death.
