= De Mowbray =

De Mowbray is a surname. Notable people with the surname include:

== Nobles ==
- Alexander de Mowbray, 14th-century Scottish noble
- Anne de Mowbray, 8th Countess of Norfolk (1472–1481), child bride of Richard of Shrewsbury, Duke of York, one of the Princes in the Tower
- Eleanor de Mowbray (before 1361–1417), sister of the 1st Earl of Nottingham and the 1st Duke of Norfolk (see below)
- Geoffrey de Mowbray (died 1300), Scottish noble, Justiciar of Lothian, Baron of Dalmeny and Lord of Barnbougle and Inverkeithing, father of Philip de Mowbray
- John de Mowbray, 2nd Baron Mowbray (1286–1322), Lord of Tanfield and Well, Yorkshire and Governor of York
- John de Mowbray, 3rd Baron Mowbray (1310–1361), only son of the 2nd Baron Mowbray
- John de Mowbray, 4th Baron Mowbray (1340–1368), knighted by King Edward III and died en route to the Holy Land
- John de Mowbray, 1st Earl of Nottingham (1365–1383), elder son of the 4th Baron Mowbray
- John Mowbray, 2nd Duke of Norfolk (1392–1432), also Baron Segrave, Baron Mowbray and Earl Marshal of England
- John de Mowbray, 4th Duke of Norfolk (1444–1476)
- Philip Mowbray or de Mowbray (died 1318), Scottish noble who opposed Robert the Bruce in the Wars of Scottish Independence
- Robert de Mowbray (died 1125), Norman warrior, Earl of Northumbria from 1086 until 1095
- Roger de Mowbray (disambiguation)
- Thomas de Mowbray, 1st Duke of Norfolk (1366–1399)
- Thomas de Mowbray, 4th Earl of Norfolk (1385–1405), English noble and rebel, son of the above
- William de Mowbray (c. 1173–c. 1224), lord of Thirsk and Mowbray, Norman lord, English noble and one of the 25 executors of Magna Carta

== Other ==
- Colin de Mowbray (1945–2010), Royal Navy helicopter pilot and round-the-world yacht races organiser and participant
- Stephen de Mowbray (1925–2016), British MI6 counterintelligence officer

== See also ==
- House of Mowbray
