= Mowbray =

Mowbray may refer to:

== People and titles ==
- Mowbray (surname), including a list of people with the name
- Mowbray (given name), a list of people with the name
- House of Mowbray, an Anglo-Norman noble house
- Baron Mowbray, a title in the Peerage of England
- Mowbray Baronets, a title in the Baronetage of the United Kingdom
- Mowbray Herald Extraordinary, an English officer of arms

== Places ==
=== Australia ===
- Mowbray, Queensland, a coastal locality
- Mowbray National Park, Queensland
- Mowbray Park and War Memorial, Brisbane, Queensland
- Mowbray, Tasmania, a suburb of Launceston

=== United Kingdom ===
- Melton Mowbray, a town in Leicestershire
- Mowbray Park, Sunderland, Tyne and Wear, England
- Vale of Mowbray, an area of North Yorkshire, England
- Mowbray, planned community in West Sussex

=== Elsewhere ===
- Mowbray, Cape Town, South Africa, a suburb of Cape Town
- Mowbray, Manitoba
  - Mowbray railway station
- Mowbray River, New Zealand

== Other uses ==
- Mowbray House, Sydney, New South Wales, Australia, a heritage-listed historic building
- Mowbray College, a former day school in Victoria, Australia
- Mowbray Cricket Club, a cricket club in Mowbray, Tasmania, Australia

== See also ==
- De Mowbray, a list of people with the surname
- Moubray (disambiguation)
- Mowbraytown Presbyterian Church, Brisbane, Queensland
- Thomas v Mowbray, a 2007 High Court of Australia decision
