= Hirst Priory =

Country house in Lincolnshire, England

Coordinates: 53.5830°N 0.8265°W

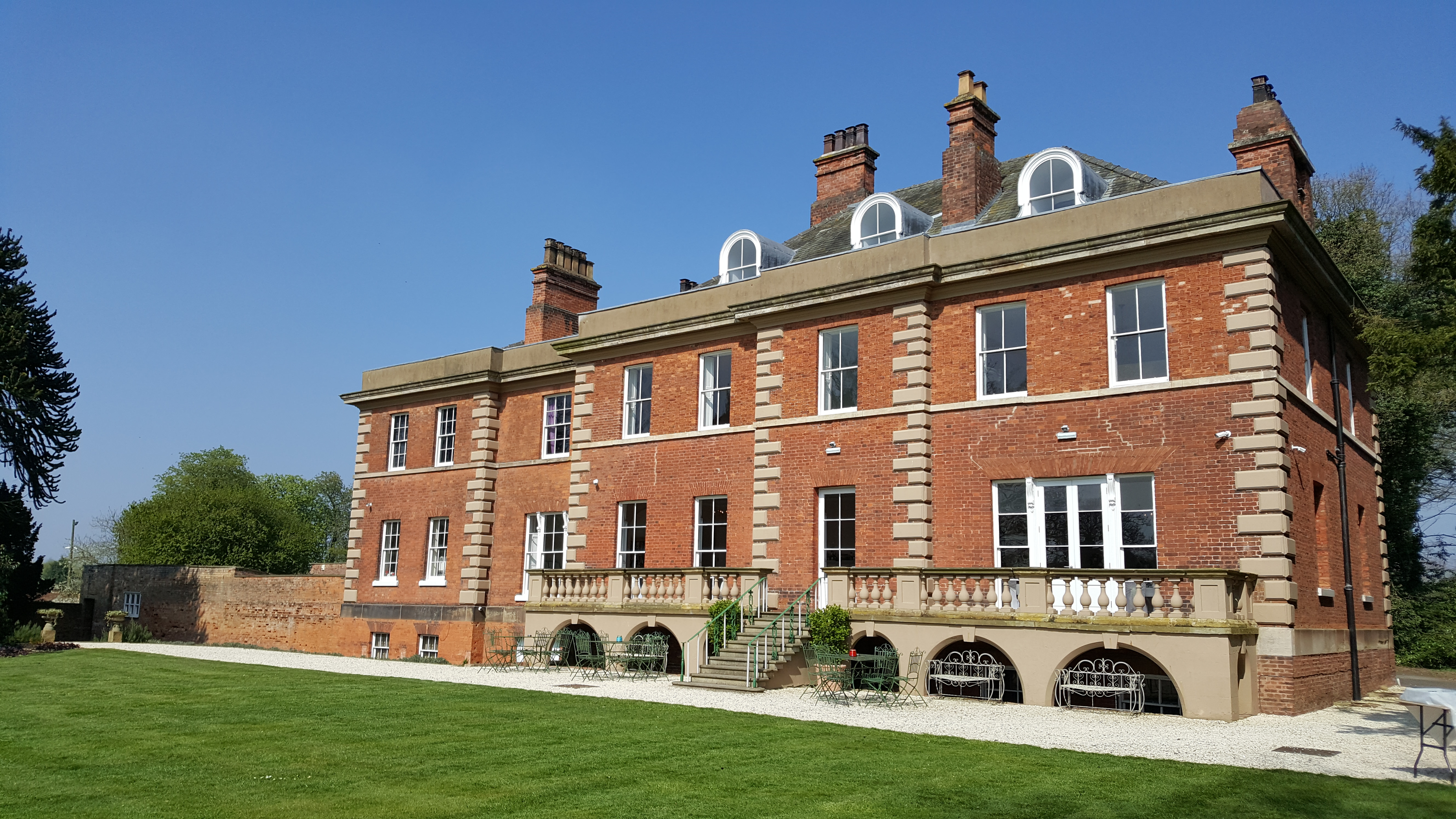
Hirst Priory, North Lincolnshire

Hirst Priory is an 18th-century country house in Belton on the Isle of Axholme, North Lincolnshire, United Kingdom. The current house was built on the site of a 12th-century Augustinian priory (Hirst Priory).

Hirst Priory served as a family residence first for the Stovin family, and later for the Lister family in the 19th century. In 1903, the property was purchased by D. Stubley for £18,000. In the early 1990s, a development group purchased Hirst Priory in order to develop a hotel and leisure complex, but these plans were abandoned. In 2014, Hirst Priory was converted to a wedding and events venue, with renovation work carried out to ensure the preservation of the Grade II listed building.

== Architecture ==
Hirst Priory is a red brick-built structure consisting of a partial subterranean basement, ground floor, first-floor, and second-floor loft space which previously served as servants' quarters.

The house was built in two stages, with the older of the two parts containing a partially subterranean brick-vaulted basement. The 19th-century extension added another more standard basement area. This part of the basement has a hand wheel water pump, an end room with barred windows, and a reinforced door reputed to have served as a temporary holding cell for the local magistrates.

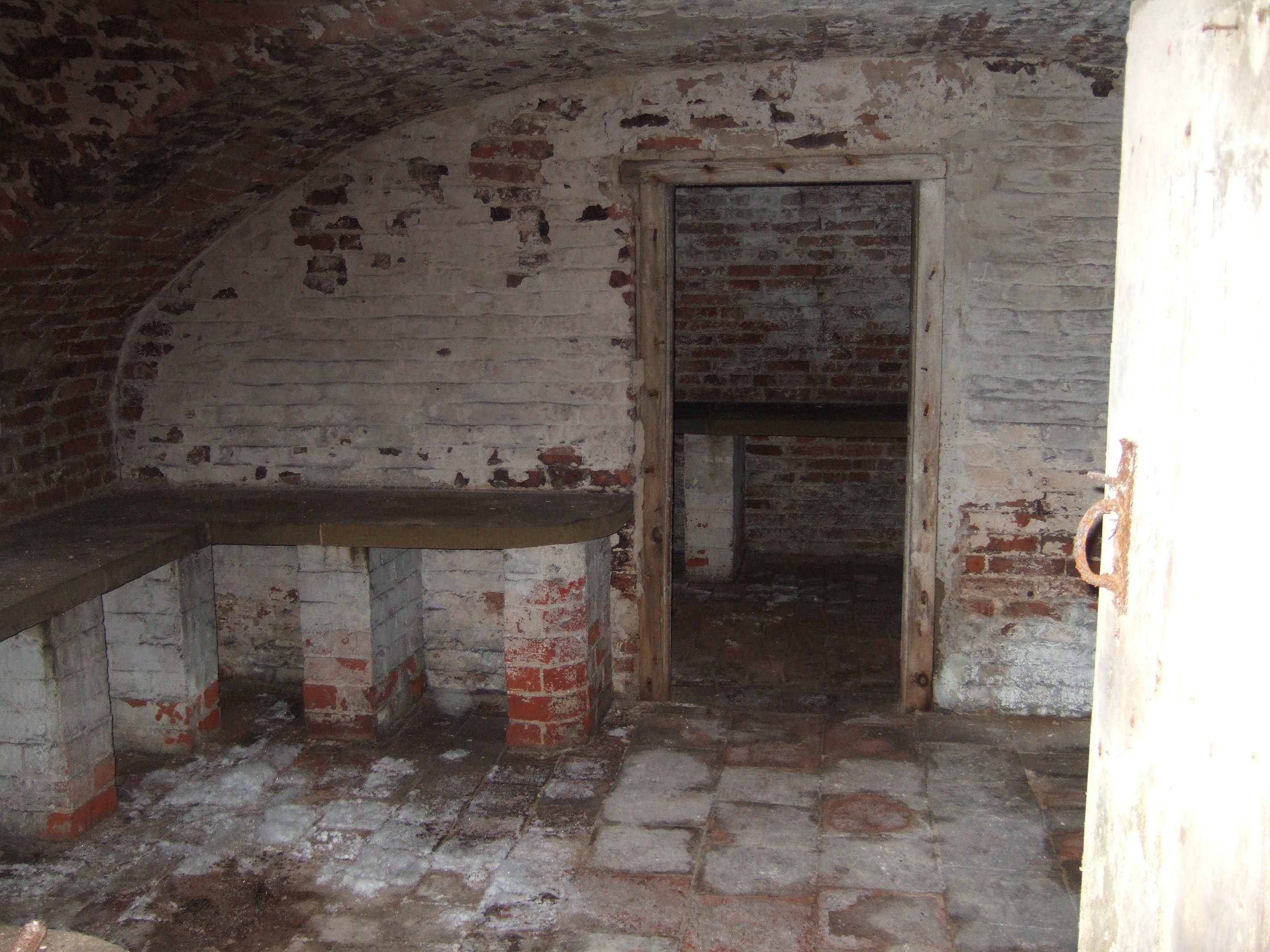
Hirst Priory's 18th-century vaulted brick basement

All the rooms, including the loft and the basement extension, have open hearths. The northwest first-floor corner room also includes a bread oven. Under the courtyard on the west side of the building is a large vaulted and vented brick storage area, most likely used for keeping fuel stores dry. The building is only accessible via raised entrances with steps to ensure the ground floor is well above any potential flood level.

== History ==
Hirst Priory was the site of Augustinian priory cell in Nostell, founded by Nigel d'Albini in the early 12th century as Hyrst Priory. It was not conventual, and was likely intended for one or two canons as a supervising estate of Nostell. It was dissolved c. 1540. A rectangular moat and buildings are shown on an "ancient map" and the Ordnance Survey 1-inch first edition map of 1824. "The moat is still perfect on the NE and W, and enclosed about half an acre of ground, an old barbary tree marks the place where the chapel stood; and at a short distance is the holy pond, which seems to have been a well dug to some small spring, which was descended by a few steps, of these there are some remains."

The present building is Georgian-Victorian, and part of the moat survives, possibly altered by later landscaping.

=== Hirst Augustinian cell ===
Founded before 1135 and dissolved in 1539, the Hirst Augustinian cell was dependent on Nostell. The priory of St. Mary was built as a dependency of Nostell by Nigel D'Albini, apparently in the reign of Henry I (Dugdale's Monasticon). The canon in charge may have had two companions at first, to comply with the regulations; but from the 14th century, there was probably only one canon with 1–2 servants, supervising the estate of Nostell.

=== North Lincolnshire Heritage Environment Record ===
The little cell of Hyrst in Axholme was built on lands granted by Nigel d'Albini to the prior and convent of Saint Oswalds, Nostell. The property consisted only of the grove and marsh of Hyrst, with certain tithes of corn, malt, and fish from the neighbourhood. In 1534 it still belonged to St. Oswald's Priory, and was worth £7 11s. 8d. a year (in the pre-decimal £sd system); in the Ministers' Accounts the value is said to be £9 8s.

There is a seal of the twelfth or early thirteenth century. The obverse is a pointed oval representing the Virgin seated on a throne, with nimbus; in the right hand is the Child, in the left hand is a scepter fleur-de-lys. The reverse is a small oval signet or counter seal representing Athena Nikephoros, to the right of a Greek oval gem.

Two arms of a potential moat were shown as earthworks on the Ordnance Survey 25-inch first edition map of 1887. They were located to the north and east of Hirst Priory house and had garden pathways within the ditches. 'Hirst' was shown on Armstrong's map of Lincolnshire, published in 1778. A house was depicted within a rectangular moat, with entrances to the south and west.

=== Listed building ===
Briefly, the listing designation describes the property as a small country house, built early-mid 18th century for Richard Taylor or Jonathan Stovin, with later 18th-century alterations for Cornelius Stovin; substantial alterations and additions of mid-19th century for George Lister, including a new west wing, remodelling north and south fronts, and a new balcony to the south. The house stands in a partly moated enclosure, on or near the site of an Augustinian cell of Nostell Priory, founded in the early 12th century and dissolved c. 1540.

=== As a wedding and events venue ===
In 2014, Hirst Priory was converted into a wedding and events venue, and a number of changes were made to the building. Alterations in 2014 were largely confined to the ground floor, with two main rooms being knocked through to create an approximately 220m^{2} function space, and alterations to a washing room, cupboard, and existing toilet to create suitable guest toilet facilities. A second wall was also knocked through and a floating floor was added to create level access to a new bar area. The use of a floating floor prevented any potential damage to the existing wood paneling, door frame, and windows. Care had to be taken to protect the intricate grade II listed coving around the ceilings during the building works.

== Owners and occupants ==
- Nigel d' Albini (son was Roger de Mowbray); granted by William the Conqueror
- Canons of St. Oswald at Nostell Priory 1540
- John Earl of Warren; granted after the Dissolution of the Monasteries
- William Breton of London
- Alexander Bannister of Epworth
- Sir Peter Ewer
- Thomas Brewer; later settled it upon his daughter and her male heirs, upon her marriage with John Taylor of Newland in Yorkshire; passed through the family.
- Richard Taylor
- Jonathan Stovin of Tetley (b. c. 1705, d. 1759)
- 1759 – Cornelius Stovin, died 1814 (b. 1738, d. 1814) – son
- 1814 – Cornelius Hartshorn Stovin, (b. 1798, d. 1845) – son
- 1845 – Anna Maria Stovin (b. 1772, d. 1847) – sister
- 1847 – James Lister (b. 1777, d. 1866) – cousin
- 1866 – George Spofforth Lister (b. 1811, d. 1903) – son
- 1903 – D. Stubley (d. 1934)

=== Tenants ===
- 1847–1866 – George Spofforth Lister
- 1869(?)–1886 – Thomas Harsley Carnochan, a solicitor in Crowle
- 1903–1934 – D. Stubley, an existing tenant at time of purchase
