= Roger de Mowbray =

Roger de Mowbray may refer to:

- Roger de Mowbray (died 1188) (c. 1120–1188), Anglo-Norman magnate
- Roger de Mowbray (d. c. 1218), younger brother of William de Mowbray
- Roger de Mowbray (c. 1220–1266), son of William de Mowbray
- Roger de Mowbray, 1st Baron Mowbray (died 1297), English peer and soldier
- Roger de Mowbray (Scottish sheriff), 13th century noble
- Roger de Mowbray (died 1320), Scottish noble, tried for treason against King Robert I of Scotland
