= Mowbray (surname) =

Mowbray is an English surname. Notable people with the surname include:

- Alan Mowbray (1896–1969), English stage and film actor
- Anna Mowbray (born 1983/1984), New Zealand entrepreneur and businessperson
- Charles Mowbray (1857–1910), British anarcho-communist
- Ethel Jones Mowbray (died 1948), American teacher, co-founder of Alpha Kappa Alpha sorority
- Francis Mowbray (died 1603), Scottish intriguer
- George Mowbray (1847–1910), English-born American politician and missionary, mayor of Tulsa, Oklahoma, 1903–1904
- Gillis Mowbray, servant of Mary, Queen of Scots
- Guy Mowbray (born 1972), British football commentator
- Harris Mowbray (born 1999), Braille-related linguist
- Harry Mowbray (1947–2022), Scottish footballer
- Harry Siddons Mowbray (1858–1928), American artist
- Louis L. Mowbray (1877–1952), Bermudian naturalist
- Malcolm Mowbray (1949–2023), British screenwriter and director
- Nick Mowbray (born 1984/1985), New Zealand entrepreneur and businessperson
- Thomas Mowbray (fl. 1850s), Queensland clergyman
- Tony Mowbray (born 1963), English footballer

== See also ==
- Mowbray (disambiguation)
- House of Mowbray
- Baron Mowbray
- Mowbray baronets
- De Mowbray, a list of people with the surname
