= Hyrst Priory =

Priory in Crowle, England

Coordinates: 53.5830°N 0.8265°W

Hyrst (or Hirst) Priory was a priory just south of the town of Crowle in the Isle of Axholme, Lincolnshire, England. It was dedicated to St. Mary.

== History ==
The cell of Hyrst was built on land granted by Nigel d'Albini to the prior and convent of Saint Oswalds, Nostell, probably early in the twelfth century. Roger de Mowbray confirmed the gifts of his father. It seems likely that there never was more than one canon living there taking charge of the lands. The charter of Nigel speaks of 'Ralf the Canon' being resident there, and the charter of Roger names 'Osbert Silvanus the Canon.'

The property consisted only of the grove and marsh of Hyrst (or Hirst), with tithes of corn, malt, and fish from the neighbourhood. As of 1534 it still belonged to St. Oswald's Priory.
