= Kirkby Malzeard =

Village and civil parish in North Yorkshire, England

Coordinates: 54°09′50″N 1°38′47″W

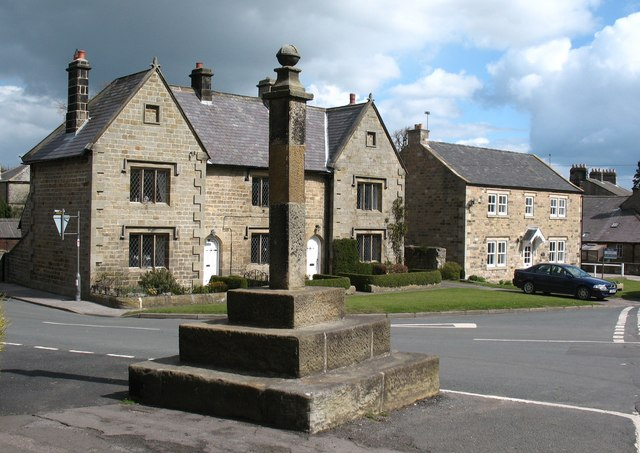
- The market cross at Kirkby Malzeard, the village was the site of a market for around 700 years

- Location within North Yorkshire
- Population: 887 (2011 census)
- OS grid reference: SE230743
- Unitary authority: North Yorkshire
- Ceremonial county: North Yorkshire
- Region: Yorkshire and the Humber
- Country: England
- Sovereign state: United Kingdom
- Post town: RIPON
- Postcode district: HG4
- Dialling code: 01765
- Police: North Yorkshire
- Fire: North Yorkshire
- Ambulance: Yorkshire
- UK Parliament: Skipton and Ripon

Kirkby Malzeard (/ˈkɜːrbi ˈmælzərd/) is a village and civil parish in the county of North Yorkshire, England. There has been a creamery in the village making Wensleydale cheese for almost 100 years, first owned by Mrs Mason, then Kit Calvert, of Hawes, subsequently the Milk Marketing Board and more recently it was acquired by the Wensleydale Creamery.

== History ==
Historically part of the West Riding of Yorkshire, the village was mentioned in the Domesday Book of 1086 as Chirchebi (meaning "church village"). The suffix Malzeard (another place-name, meaning "bad clearing" in Norman French) was added by the early 12th century. In medieval times the honour of Kirkby Malzeard included large areas to the west of the village in upper Nidderdale, and the parish came to include several townships:

- Azerley
- Fountains Earth
- Grewelthorpe
- Hartwith cum Winsley (a detached part)
- Laverton
- Stonebeck Down
- Stonebeck Up

The townships became separate civil parishes in the 19th century.

In mediaeval times there was a castle at Kirkby Malzeard, held by the de Mowbray family. When Roger de Mowbray participated in the Revolt of 1173–74 against King Henry II, the castle was besieged by the Bishop elect of Lincoln, and Mowbray surrendered it, together with Thirsk Castle, to the king: both castles were demolished. St Andrew's Church, Kirkby Malzeard was built in the 12th century.

In 1307, King Edward I granted Kirkby Malzeard the right to hold two fairs annually, and a weekly market on Wednesday. These were subsequently abandoned, but revived in 1816. In 1871 the fairs were still held (on Whit Monday and 2 October), but the market had lapsed again.

Creets Bridge, across the Kex Beck, was built in 1749.

In 1866 a landowner named Joseph Helliwell demolished the Market Cross. There was an outcry, and after a year of litigation, Helliwell was compelled to remove a cottage and part of his house that were encroaching on the Market Place. A new Market Cross was erected by public subscription, inaugurated on 30 September 1868. Several newspapers and documents relating to the market place and the cross were placed in a sealed bottle when the foundations were laid.

The writer and historian William Grainge was born to a farming family at Dishforth, and grew up at Castiles Farm, near Kirkby Malzeard. He attended Kirkby Malzeard village school, the only formal education that he received; he was otherwise self-educated.

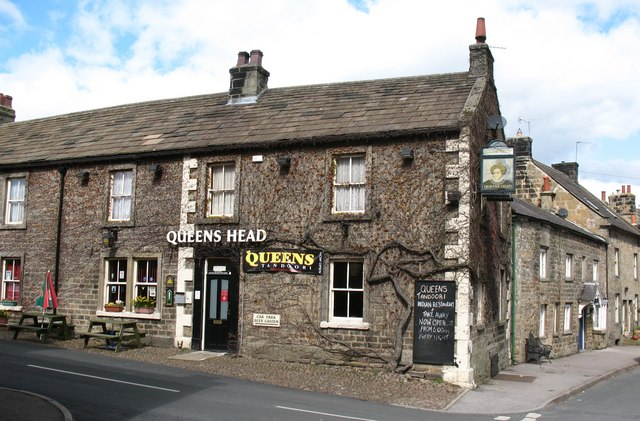
The Queens Head in 2008

== Amenities ==
The Highside Playing Fields, which provide facilities for several sports, were created in the 1970s. One of the benefactors was Bing Crosby, who came shooting in the area in 1975. He donated £1,250 towards the playing fields, and visited them during a cricket match in 1976.

There is a convenience store and a butcher in Kirkby Malzeard, as well as one pub, the Queens Head. A second pub, The Henry Jenkins, (named after a man from Ellerton-on-Swale who died in 1670, allegedly aged 169), closed on 29 June 2008, and in 2016 is derelict. The Shoulder of Mutton, a seventeenth century listed private house, was formerly a pub.

== Governance ==
An electoral ward in the same name exists. This ward stretches south to Sawley and has a total population taken at the 2011 census of 3,109.

From 1974 to 2023 it was part of the Borough of Harrogate, it is now administered by the unitary North Yorkshire Council.

== See also ==
- Listed buildings in Kirkby Malzeard
