= Thirsk Castle =

Former castle building in North Yorkshire, England

- Thirsk, North Yorkshire in England
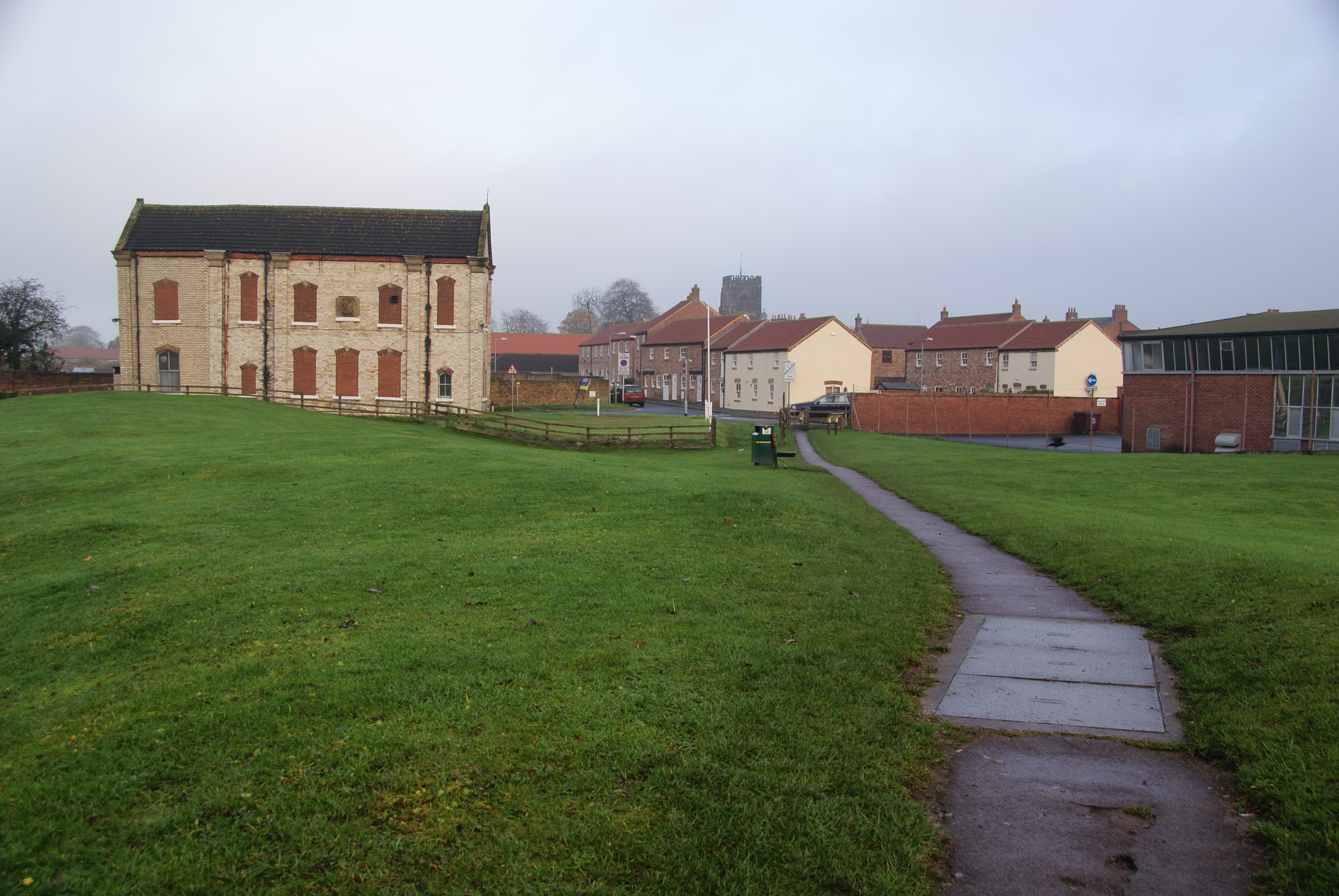
- Castle Croft, Thirsk. The castle was to the left.

Site information
- Type: Castle

Location
- Location within North Yorkshire
- Coordinates: 54.232°N 1.345°W
- Grid reference: SE427820

Site history
- Built: c. 1092
- In use: c. 1176
- Fate: Demolished

Thirsk Castle was a medieval castle in the town of Thirsk, in North Yorkshire, England. The castle was one of three held by the de Mowbray family in Yorkshire and was destroyed in 1176.

== History ==
Thirsk Castle belonged to the de Mowbray family, who possessed two other castles in Yorkshire, at Burton-in-Lonsdale and Kirkby Malzeard. Additionally, the de Mowbray family had a fourth castle at Epworth on the Isle of Axholme (now Lincolnshire). Thirsk Castle is believed to have been built in the 1090s, with the castle becoming a holding place for the gathering fighters for the Battle of the Standard at nearby Northallerton. The massed fighters set out for the battlefield from Thirsk Castle.

The date of the castle's construction has been the subject of some debate, with writers in the 19th century believing it to predate the Conquest, however there is no evidence of this. (Note: Jefferson writing in The History of Thirsk states the town grew from a few houses clustered around the 10th century castle.) In the late 1130s/early 1140s, monks who had lost their lands in Cumbria to Scots raids, were offered sanctuary at the castle before being given lands by the de Mowbray family at Byland for their own house.

Roger de Mowbray lost favour with the king (Henry II of England), and rebelled against him in the Great Revolt. Henry later besieged Thirsk Castle, and de Mowbray was forced to give up his castles, including Thirsk in 1175. Henry II ordered that the castles at Kirkby Malzeard and Thirsk be destroyed (slighted) in early 1176. Roger de Mowbray left to Crusade in the Holy Land, dying after being taken prisoner after the Battle of Hattin.

The castle was said to have covered 4 acres (1.6 ha), being quite prominent on the skyline in Thirsk, and commanding the road north from York.

After its destruction, material from the castle was said to have been used in the construction of the church in Thirsk, (which can be seen in the background of the image). The de Mowbray family still owned the land, and a manor house that was built upon the site was supposedly destroyed in a Scots raid in 1322. Excavations on the site have determined that the bailey rampart was about 460 feet (140 m) in length, which had a ditch on the outer side some 33 feet (10 m) wide, and 6 feet 7 inches (2 m) deep. The site is now protected as a scheduled monument.
