= Philip Mowbray =

Scottish nobleman

Philip de Mowbray
- Noble family: House of Mowbray

Sir Philip Mowbray or Philip de Mowbray (died 1318) was a Scottish noble who opposed Robert the Bruce in the Wars of Scottish Independence. He later changed his allegiance to Scotland and was killed in 1318 fighting in Ireland.

== Life ==
He was the son of Sir Geoffrey de Mowbray and a daughter of John I Comyn, Lord of Badenoch and Alice de Ros. Philip married Eva de Umfraville, Lady Redcastle, daughter and heiress of Ingram de Umfraville.

In 1307, he was at the head of an English force of 1,000 men going from Bothwell Castle to Kyle when they were ambushed by Bruce's ally Sir James Douglas. While his forces retreated to Bothwell, Mowbray, who had lost his sword, fled a long way to Inverkip Castle. According to John Barbour's The Brus:

Sync throu the Largis, him allane

Till Ennerkip the way he tane,
Rigcht to the castell that wes then
Stuffyt all with Ingless men,

That him resaiffyt in daynte.

He subsequently was made Constable of Stirling Castle, which was held by English forces. It came under prolonged siege from Edward Bruce, the King's younger brother, and in 1314 they made a deal that the castle would return to Scottish control unless relieved by English forces before 24 June. When the English army arrived Mowbray advised Edward II of England against taking Bruce on, but Edward insisted leading to the Battle of Bannockburn.

Mowbray subsequently changed to supporting Bruce, and was killed alongside Edward Bruce at the Battle of Faughart in 1318. His son John succeeded to his estates, and also the Umfraville estates, including Tours-en-Vimeu in France.

His brother Roger de Mowbray, the Standard Bearer of Scotland was arrested in 1320 for treason against King Robert I of Scotland. His daughter Phillippa married Bartholomew de Leon, she was restored her brother's (father's?) forfeited lands in 1346, their son David adopted the names and arms of Mowbray.
