= Nigel d'Aubigny =

Norman lord and baron (died 1129)

- Died: 21 November 1129 unknown
- Family: House of Mowbray
- Spouse: Matilda de L'Aigle; Gundred de Gournay
- Issue: Roger de Mowbray
- Father: Roger d'Aubigny
- Mother: Amice or Avice Mowbray

Nigel d'Aubigny (Neel d'Aubigny or Nigel de Albini, died 1129), was a Norman Lord and English baron who was the son of Roger d'Aubigny and Amice or Avice de Mowbray. His paternal grandfather, William was lord of Aubigny. Nigel and his brother were supporters of Henry I of England. His brother William d'Aubigny Pincerna was the king's Butler and father of the 1st Earl of Arundel. Nigel was the founder of the noble House of Mowbray.

== Life ==
He is described as "one of the most favoured of Henry's 'new men'". While he entered the king's service as a household knight and brother of the king's butler, William d'Aubigny, in the years following the Battle of Tinchebrai in 1106 Nigel was rewarded by Henry with marriage to an heiress who brought him lordship in Normandy and with the lands of several men, primarily that of Robert de Stuteville. The Mowbray honour became one of the wealthiest estates in Norman England. From 1107 to about 1118, Nigel served as a royal official in Yorkshire and Northumberland. In the last decade of his life he was frequently traveling with Henry I, most likely as one of the king's trusted military and administrative advisors. He died in Normandy, possibly at the abbey of Bec.

== Family ==
Nigel's first marriage, after 1107, was to Matilda de L'Aigle, whose prior marriage to the disgraced and imprisoned Robert de Mowbray, Earl of Northumbria, had been annulled based on consanguinity. She brought to the marriage with Nigel her ex-husband's lordship of Montbray (Mowbray). Following a decade of childless marriage and the death of her powerful brother, Nigel in turn repudiated Matilda based on his consanguinity with her former husband, and in June 1118 Nigel married to Gundred de Gournay (died 1155), daughter of Gerard de Gournay and his wife Edith de Warenne, and hence granddaughter of William de Warenne, 1st Earl of Surrey. Nigel and Gundred had son who would be known as Roger de Mowbray after the former Mowbray lands he would inherit from his father, and he was progenitor of the later noble Mowbray family.
