= Listed buildings in Kirkby Malzeard =

Kirkby Malzeard is a civil parish in the county of North Yorkshire, England. It contains 23 listed buildings that are recorded in the National Heritage List for England. Of these, one is listed at Grade I, the highest of the three grades, and the others are at Grade II, the lowest grade. The parish contains the village of Kirkby Malzeard and the surrounding area. Most of the listed buildings are houses and associated structures, farmhouses and farm buildings, and the others include a church, tombs in the churchyard and a churchyard cross, a pinfold, a bridge, and a market cross.

== Key ==
Grade	Criteria
I	Buildings of exceptional interest, sometimes considered to be internationally important
II	Buildings of national importance and special interest

== Buildings ==
Name and location	Photograph	Date	Notes	Grade
St Andrew's Church; 54.16604°N 1.64091°W		12th century	The church has been altered and extended through the centuries, including a restoration in 1878–80 by Arthur Blomfield, and in 1910 by J. Oldrid Scott following a fire. It is built in stone with lead roofs, and consists of a nave with a north aisle, a south porch, a chancel with a north aisle, and a west tower. The tower has three stages, a plinth with a carved frieze, diagonal buttresses, a south buttressed stair turret, and a three-light Perpendicular west window with a hood mould. In the south front is a small ogee-headed opening and a clock face, the top stage contains three-light bell openings, above which is an embattled parapet with corner pinnacles. The south doorway has a round arch, two orders of columns with scalloped capitals, and three orders of arches with zigzag decoration.	I
Churchyard cross 54.16590°N 1.64031°W	—	Medieval	The cross is in the churchyard of St Andrew's Church, to the southeast of the church. It is in stone, and has a circular plinth, a square shaft, and a simple Celtic cross head.	II
The Shoulder of Mutton; 54.16567°N 1.64134°W	—	17th century	The house, at one time a public house, is in rendered stone, and has a pantile roof with three courses of stone slates. There are two storeys and three bays, and a single-storey outshut on the right. The central doorway has a chamfered surround and a fanlight, and the windows are sashes with chamfered surrounds.	II
Table Tomb to William and Helen Holds; 54.16591°N 1.64063°W	—	1674	The table tomb is in the churchyard of St Andrew's Church, to the south of the chancel of the church, and is to the memory of William and Helen Holds. It consists of a rectangular stone slab with well cut inscriptions, on short columns with moulded bases and capitals.	II
Lawnwith Farmhouse; 54.16390°N 1.62909°W	—	1703	The farmhouse is in stone with a moulded cornice and a pantile roof. There are two storeys and three bays. The doorway has a moulded architrave with impost bands, and the windows are mullioned. In the centre is a datestone with curved framing.	II
Table tomb southeast of the chancel 54.16595°N 1.64045°W	—	1705	The table tomb is in the churchyard of St Andrew's Church, to the southeast of the chancel of the church. It consists of a rectangular slab with a moulded shield shape, on four legs with half-columns facing the outside. The lettering is badly worn.	II
1 Church Street; 54.16510°N 1.64147°W	—	Early 18th century	The house is in stone, with quoins, and a Welsh slate roof with coping on the left. There are two storeys and four bays. On the front is a doorway with a chamfered surround and a gabled wooden hood with a finial and pendants. To its right is a square bay window with a plinth, a frieze and a cornice. There are two single-light windows, the other windows are mullioned, and they have moulded architraves.	II
Tombstone to Peter Save; 54.16589°N 1.64106°W	—	1732	The tombstone is in the churchyard of St Andrew's Church, to the south of the west end of the nave of the church, and is to the memory of Peter Save, vicar of the parish. It is in stone, and consists of a shaped tablet with moulded edges, on a plinth with carved consoles on each side. On the front is an inscription.	II
Table Tomb to George Hewitt; 54.16594°N 1.64039°W	—	1739	The table tomb is in the churchyard of St Andrew's Church, to the southeast of the chancel of the church, and is to the memory of George Hewitt. It consists of a rectangular stone slab, arched at the top, on short square legs. The lettering is bordered by a shield shape.	II
Mowbray House; 54.16529°N 1.64010°W	—	Mid 18th century	A country house in stone with quoins, central rusticated pilasters, moulded eaves, a balustrade, and hipped tile roofs. There are two storeys and seven bays, flanked by three-bay canted bay windows. The central doorway has a fanlight and a flat hood with a balustraded balcony, above which is a sash window with a moulded surround and a panel with a coat of arms under a segmental pediment. The windows are sashes. To the left is a screen wall with a balustrade and a central pedimented finial. The south front has five bays and a projecting loggia on the right containing three arches with keystones.	II
South View; 54.16379°N 1.65185°W	—	18th century	The house is in stone, with chamfered quoins, an eaves band, and a stone slate roof with stone coping. There are two storeys and three bays. The central doorway has a Gibbs surround and a moulded open pediment. The windows are casements in moulded architraves with double keystones.	II
Cottage to right of Churchbye House; 54.16547°N 1.64140°W	—	Mid to late 18th century	The house is in stone, and has a pantile roof with two courses of stone slates, and stone coping on the right. There are two storeys and two bays. The central doorway has a chamfered surround, and a lintel with rounded corners. The windows are casements with plain surrounds.	II
Churchbye House and railings 54.16539°N 1.64148°W	—	Late 18th century	The house is in stone, with chamfered quoins, a sill band, and a stone slate roof with stone copings and shaped kneelers. There are two storeys and three bays. The doorway has Doric pilasters, a fanlight and a keystone. The windows are sashes with plain surrounds. In front are wrought iron railings, the bars with spear finials, and urn finials on the corners.	II
Creets Bridge; 54.16551°N 1.63275°W		Late 18th century	The bridge carries a road over Kex Beck. It is in stone, and consists of a single segmental arch with voussoirs and a keystone. It has flanking pilasters, a band, and a coped parapet.	II
Pinfold; 54.16431°N 1.64844°W	—	Late 18th century	The pinfold is in stone, and has wall about 0.75 metres (2 ft 6 in) high with curved coping. The north wall is straight, and the other walls are irregular. At the northeast corner is a gateway with stone jambs and a cast iron gate.	II
Rose Cottage and adjoining house 54.16449°N 1.64453°W	—	Late 18th century	The two houses are in stone, with quoins, and a pantile roof with stone coping. There are two storeys and five bays. On the front are two doorways, the windows are a mix of casements and horizontally-sliding sashes, and all the openings have segmental arches with voussoirs.	II
Barn, Long Swales Lane; 54.16447°N 1.64651°W	—	1791	The barn is in stone, with quoins, and a pantile roof with stone gable copings, and a single storey. On the front is a central doorway, at the rear is a segmental-arched cart entrance with dated keystone, and in the west gable is a small upper opening.	II
Kexmoor Farmhouse East, outbuilding and pump 54.17050°N 1.69283°W	—	Early 19th century	The farmhouse is in stone, with quoins, and a stone slate roof with stone coping. There are two storeys and an L-shaped plan, with a front of three bays, a rear wing and an adjoining outhouse. In the centre is a doorway, and the windows are sashes, all with plain surrounds. At the rear is a round-headed stair window, and in the outhouse are large rectangular bee boles. In front of the outhouse is an initialled and dated pump.	II
Cart shed/granary, Kexmoor Farm East; 54.17098°N 1.69263°W	—	Early 19th century	The farm building is in stone, with quoins, a moulded eaves band and a slate roof. There are two storeys and two bays. In the gable end is a doorway in a segmental arch with voussoirs, and flanked by buttresses. Over it is a round-arched door with raised impost bands and a keystone, above which is a similar opening, smaller and blind. On the right return are external steps to the granary, and the left return contains two hayloft doors.	II
Dovecote, Kexmoor Farm East; 54.17071°N 1.69279°W	—	Early 19th century	The dovecote is in stone, with quoins, a moulded eaves band, and a pyramidal slate roof. There are four storeys and one bay. In the ground floor is a doorway with a plain surround, and external steps leading to the next floor. Above are a doorway, windows, and a round-arched opening with three rows of pigeon holes.	II
The Old Rectory; 54.16558°N 1.64095°W	—	Early 19th century	The house is in stone, with quoins, a sill band, an eaves band, and a hipped slate roof. There are two storeys and three bays. In the centre is a Doric doorcase with a plinth, half-columns, a frieze, a cornice and a pediment, and a doorway with a fanlight. The windows are sashes with flat brick arches and incised voussoirs. Ar the rear is a round-headed stair window.	II
Barkways and Greystone; 54.16500°N 1.64114°W		Mid 19th century	A pair of houses in stone, with quoins, and a Welsh slate roof with stone coping and fleur de lys finials. There are two storeys and three bays, the outer bays projecting and gabled. In the outer parts of the middle bay are round-arched doorways with chamfered surrounds and lintels with pointed arches. The windows are mullioned with hood moulds.	II
Market Cross; 54.16481°N 1.64127°W		1886	The market cross is in stone, and it has a square shaft on a stepped square base. At the top is a plain cornice and a banded ball finial, and half way up the shaft is an inscribed cast iron plaque.	II
