= Moubray =

Moubray may refer to:

- Moubray Glacier, Antarctica
- Moubray Piedmont Glacier, Antarctica
- Moubray Bay, Antarctica
- Moubray St John, 19th Baron St John of Bletso (1877-1934), an English peer
- John James Moubray, Lord Lieutenant of Kinross-shire, Scotland, from 1911 to 1928

== See also ==
- Moubray House, Edinburgh, Scotland
- Mowbray (disambiguation)
