= William d'Aubigny (died 1139) =

Anglo-French baron

William
- Butler to Henry I
- Died: 1139
- Buried: Wymondham Abbey
- Noble family: House of Mowbray
- Spouses: Maud, daughter of Roger Bigod of Norfolk
- Issue: William d'Aubigny, 1st Earl of Arundel
- Father: Roger d'Aubigny
- Mother: Amice

William d'Aubigny (died 1139), sometimes William de Albini, was an Anglo-French baron and administrator who served successive kings of England and acquired large estates in Norfolk. From his title of Butler (pincerna in medieval Latin) to King Henry I of England, he was called William d'Aubigny Pincerna to distinguish him from other men of the same name.

== Origins ==
From a family originating in the village of Aubigny in Loire region of France and born before 1070, William was the eldest surviving son of Roger d’Aubigny and his wife, Amice. William‘s brother was Nigel d'Aubigny.

== Career ==
Not mentioned as a landholder in the 1086 Domesday Book, he was associated with King William II of England by 1091 and in that decade is recorded as an important landholder in the county of Norfolk.

His involvement in central government increased after 1100, when Henry I became king of England. In 1101 he was a witness to the treaty in which Robert II, Count of Flanders pledged military support to Henry and is named there as pincerna, evidence that he was one of the chief officers of the royal household. As part of the king's court, he travelled with him and spent about a quarter of his time in Normandy rather than England. By 1130 he was also a royal judge, hearing cases in Essex and in Lincolnshire.

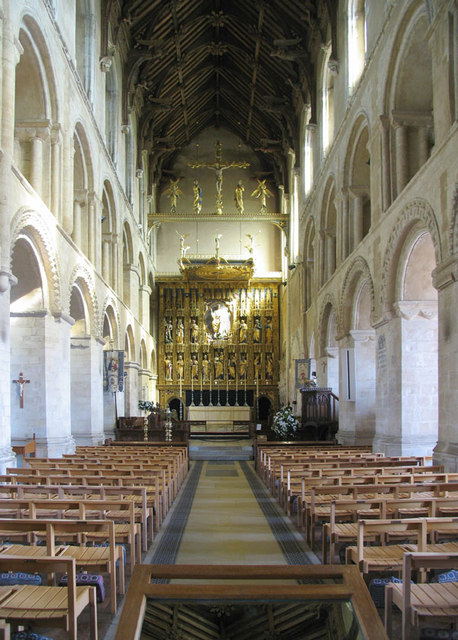
Nave of Wymondham Abbey

His Norfolk estates grew over the years, until in 1135 he had 22 knights holding lands in his barony there, and he also had lands in Kent. At Old Buckenham, the first castle was probably built in his time, as was the nave of Wymondham Priory, now part of the parish church, which he founded in 1107. He was also a benefactor to his father-in-law's foundation of Thetford Priory and, in Normandy, to the Benedictine abbey of Lessay that his father had supported.

When Stephen became king in 1135, William initially retained his place at court, but had died by June 1139, and was buried at Wymondham.

== Founder of Wymondham Priory ==
In or before 1107, William d'Aubigny, founded the Priory of Wymondham in Norfolk as a subordinate cell to the Monastery of St. Albans Abbey in Hertfordshire, and it continued as such until 1448, when it was converted into an independent abbey by a bull of Pope Nicholas V. Its original foundation occurred during the tenure of William's uncle, Richard d'Aubigny, Abbot of St. Albans from 1097 until his death in 1119.

== Family ==
He married Maud, daughter of Roger Bigod of Norfolk and sister of Hugh Bigod, 1st Earl of Norfolk, and had issue:

- William d'Aubigny, 1st Earl of Arundel
