= William de Mowbray =

12th and 13th-century English baron, executor of Magna Carta

- Born: 1173; Thirsk Castle, Thirsk, Yorkshire, Kingdom of England
- Died: 1224 (aged 50–51); Isle of Axholme, Epworth, Lincolnshire, Kingdom of England
- Buried: Newburgh Priory
- Family: Mowbray
- Issue: Nigel de Mowbrey; Roger de Mowbrey
- Father: Nigel de Mowbray
- Mother: Mabel

William de Mowbray (c. 1173–c. 1224), lord of Thirsk and Mowbray, was a Norman lord and English noble who was one of the twenty-five executors of Magna Carta. He was described as being as small as a dwarf but very generous and valiant.

== Family origin ==
William was the eldest son of Nigel de Mowbray, who died on crusade at Acre in 1191, by Mabel, probably daughter of William de Patri. His paternal grandfather was Roger de Mowbray.

== Career under Richard I ==
Mowbray was in the company of Richard I in Speyer, Germany, on 20 November 1193 during Richard's period of captivity, perhaps having accompanied the monarch on his return from Palestine. In 1194 he had livery of his lands, paying a relief of £100. He was immediately called upon to pay a sum nearly as large as his share of the scutage levied towards Richard's ransom, for the payment of which he was one of the hostages. William was later a witness to Richard's treaty with Baldwin of Flanders in 1197.

== Career under John ==
In 1215 Mowbray was prominent with other north-country barons in opposing King John. He was appointed one of the twenty-five executors of Magna Carta, and as such was specially named among those excommunicated by Pope Innocent III. His youngest brother, Roger, has sometimes been reckoned as one of the twenty-five, apparently by confusion with, or as a substitute for, Roger de Mumbezon. Roger died without heirs about 1218, and William received his lands.

== Career under Henry III ==
In the First Barons' War, Mowbray supported Louis. Mowbray was taken prisoner in the Battle of Lincoln (1217), and his estates bestowed upon William Marshal the younger; but he redeemed them by the surrender of the lordship of Bensted in Surrey to Hubert de Burgh, before the general restoration in September of that year.

In January 1221, Mowbray assisted Hubert in driving his former co-executor, William of Aumâle, from his last stronghold at Bytham in Lincolnshire.

== Benefactor, marriage and succession ==
Mowbray founded the chapel of St. Nicholas, with a chantry, at Thirsk, and was a benefactor of his grandfather's foundations at Furness Abbey and Newburgh, where, on his death in Axholme in or before March 1224, he was buried.

Mowbray is found in contemporary documents only with a wife named Avice, by her having sons Nigel and Roger. A 16th-century rendering of the Progenies Moubraiorum attributes to him a different wife, Agnes, daughter of William d'Aubigny, 3rd Earl of Arundel, of the elder branch of the d'Aubignys, but she is not found in contemporary records. William's eldest son and successor, Nigel, paid £500 for relief of his paternal lands, but left no issue by his wife Maud, and was succeeded by his younger brother Roger, who only came of age in 1241, and died in 1266. This Roger's son, another Roger, was summoned to Parliament as Baron Mowbray.
