= Creets Bridge =

Bridge in North Yorkshire, England

Coordinates: 54°09′56″N 1°37′58″W

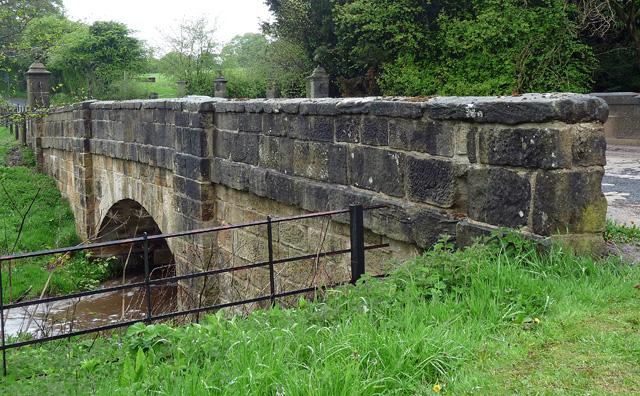
The bridge, in 2013

Creets Bridge is a historic bridge in Kirkby Malzeard, a village in North Yorkshire, in England.

The bridge crosses Kex Beck, about 0.31 miles (0.5 km) east of the village of Kirkby Malzard. It was built in 1749, by Jason Clarkson and John Gill. It was grade II listed in 1987. The bridge was damaged by flooding in 2000, following which it was partly rebuilt, using the original stones.

The bridge is built of stone, and consists of a single segmental arch with voussoirs and a keystone. The arch is 6.36m wide, and rises 1.15m, while the bridge is 4.90m wide. It has flanking pilasters, a band, and a coped parapet. At the west end are two masonry piers, topped by wooden ball finials. During the reconstruction of the bridge, the date stone was recovered from the river, inscribed "Built by Ias Clarkson and Ino Gill junr Anno 1749 Musa Mechanica".

== See also ==
- Listed buildings in Kirkby Malzeard
