= St Andrew's Church, Kirkby Malzeard =

Church in North Yorkshire, England

Coordinates: 54.1660°N 1.6409°W

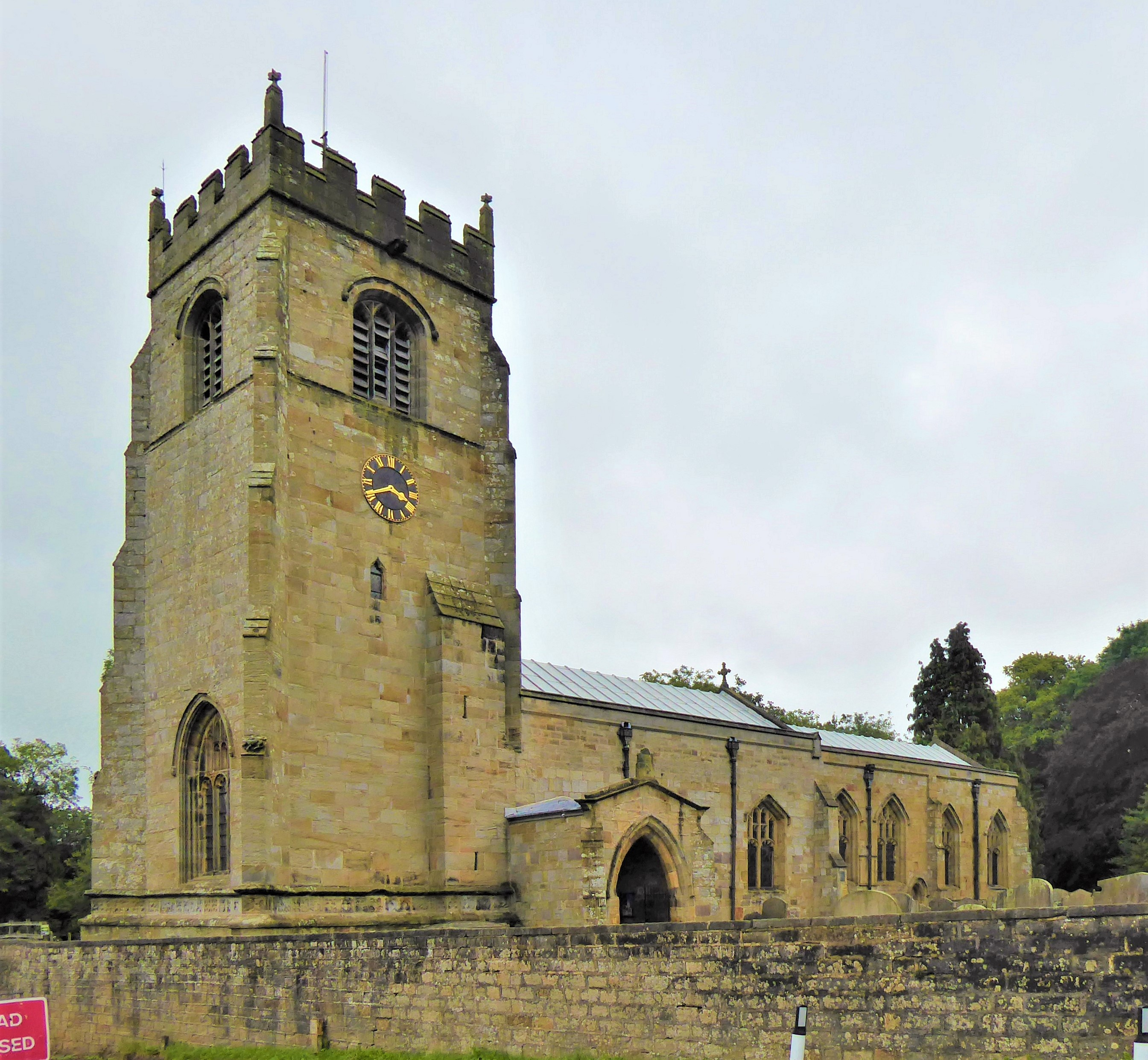
The church, in 2019

St Andrew's Church is the parish church of Kirkby Malzeard, a village in North Yorkshire, in England.

The name "Kirkby" suggests a Saxon church existed in the village. The current building dates from the 12th century, probably the late 1130s, from which period the south wall of the nave including a doorway, and the chancel arch survive. The remainder of the nave, the chancel and the porch are 13th century, while the west tower and vestry were added in the 15th century. The building was restored between 1878 and 1880 by Arthur Blomfield. In 1908, the church suffered a major fire which destroyed the roofs and much of the northern nave arcade. A restoration by J. Oldrid Scott was completed in 1910. The church was grade I listed in 1967.

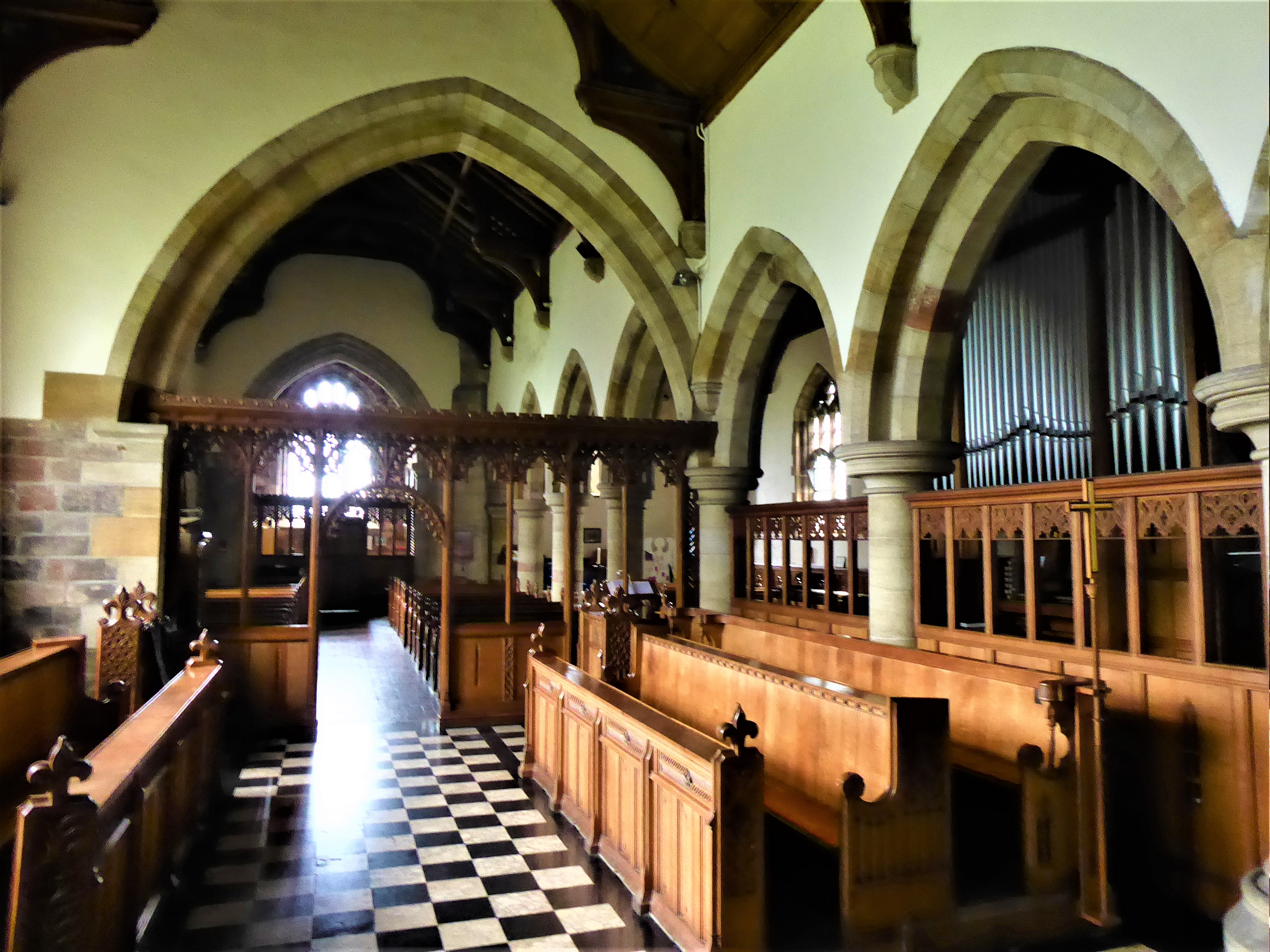
The choir

The church is built of stone with lead roofs, and consists of a nave with a north aisle, a south porch, a chancel with a north aisle, and a west tower. The tower has three stages, a plinth with a carved frieze, diagonal buttresses, a south buttressed stair turret, and a three-light Perpendicular west window with a hood mould. In the south front is a small ogee-headed opening and a clock face, the top stage contains three-light bell openings, above which is an embattled parapet with corner pinnacles. The south doorway has a round arch, two orders of columns with scalloped capitals, and three orders of arches with zigzag decoration. Inside, there is a 13th-century sedilia, and the east end of the north aisle has been made into a chapel, with furnishings by Robert Thompson.

== See also ==
- Grade I listed buildings in North Yorkshire (district)
- Listed buildings in Kirkby Malzeard
