= Stovin =

Stovin is an English surname. Notable people with the surname include:

- Frederick Stovin (1783–1865), British Army officer
- Fred Stovin-Bradford (1919–1974), Royal Navy officer and aviator
- Richard Stovin (died 1825), British Army officer
