= Mowbray (given name) =

Mowbray is a masculine given name borne by:

- Mowbray Howard, 6th Earl of Effingham (1905–1996)
- Mowbray O'Rorke (1869–1953), Anglican bishop in Africa
- Mowbray Ritchie (1905–1966), Scottish chemist
- Mowbray Thomson (1832–1917), British East India Company officer
- Mowbray Weir (1908–1976), Australian rules footballer
