= William d'Aubigny, 1st Earl of Arundel =

English nobleman (c. 1109-1176)

William d'Aubigny
- Earl of Lincoln; Earl of Arundel
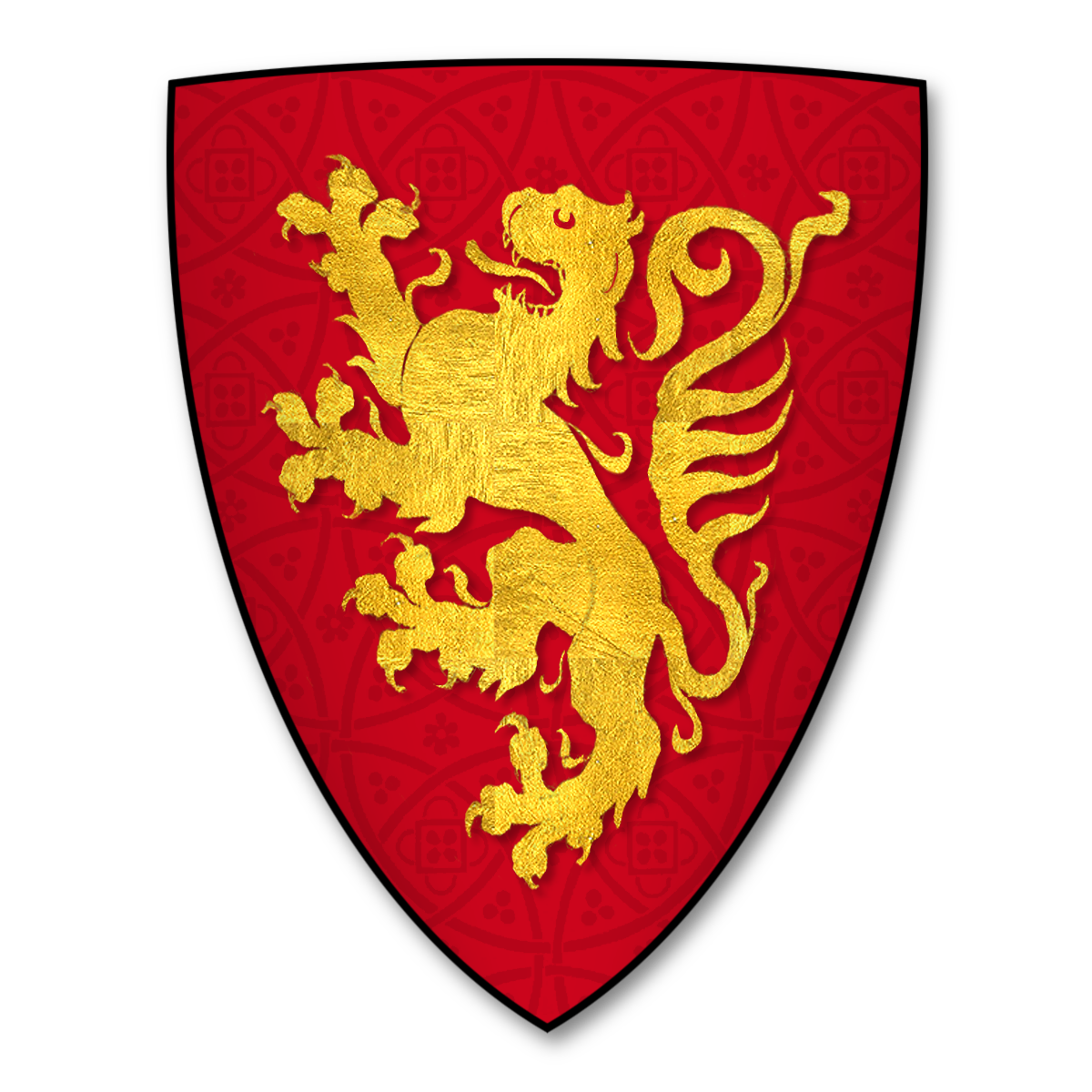
- Died: 12 October 1176
- Buried: Wymondham Abbey
- Noble family: House of Mowbray
- Spouse: Adeliza of Louvain
- Issue: William d'Aubigny, 2nd Earl of Arundel; Reynor d'Aubigny; Henry d'Aubigny; Geoffrey d'Aubigny; Simon d'Aubigny; Alice d'Aubigny; Olivia d'Aubigny; Agatha d'Aubigny
- Father: William d'Aubigny
- Mother: Maud Bigod
- Occupation: Master butler of the Royal household

William d'Aubigny (c. 1109 – 12 Oct 1176), also known as William d'Albini, William de Albini and William de Albini II, was an English nobleman. He was son of William d'Aubigny and Maud Bigod, daughter of Roger Bigod of Norfolk.

William fought loyally for King Stephen of England, who created him first Earl of Arundel (more precisely, Earl of Sussex) and then Earl of Lincoln. In 1153 he helped arrange the truce between Stephen and Henry Plantagenet, known as the Treaty of Wallingford, which brought an end to The Anarchy. His first known appearance as "earl" was at Christmas 1141. When Henry Plantagenet ascended the throne as Henry II, he confirmed William's earldom and gave him direct possession of Arundel Castle (instead of the possession in right of his wife (died 1151) he had previously had). He remained loyal to the king during the 1173 revolt of Henry the Young King, and helped defeat the rebellion.

In 1143, as Earl of Lincoln, he made two charters confirming a donation of land around Arundel in Sussex to the abbey of Affligem in Brabant, with William's brother, Olivier, present.

Castle Rising, one of Norfolk's best-preserved 12th-century castles, located in the village of the same name, was constructed by William, and later sold to Queen Isabella, who resided there following her fall from power in 1330.

William is the first proven English supporter of the crusader Order of St. Lazarus of Jerusalem and before 1146 had granted them land at Wymondham and built a Leper Hospital near his castle in Norfolk. His wife, Adeliza, was also a major benefactor to leper hospitals at Wilton, Wiltshire and Arundel and his cousin, Roger de Mowbray and his family, were to become the most significant patrons of the Order's headquarters at Burton Lazars Hospital.

== Marriage ==
William was an important member of Henry I of England's household, and after the king's death he married Henry's widow, Queen Adeliza of Louvain, in 1138. William and Adeliza were parents to the following children:

- William d'Aubigny, 2nd Earl of Arundel
- Reynor
- Henry
- Geoffrey
- Simon
- Alice
- Olivia
- Agatha

== Sources ==
- Brown, R. Allen (1988). Castle Rising Castle. London, UK: English Heritage. ISBN 185074159X.
- Remfry, Paul Martin. Buckenham Castles, 1066 to 1649. ISBN 1-899376-28-3.
- Weis, Frederick Lewis (2004). Ancestral Roots of Certain American Colonists Who Came to America Before 1700 (8th ed.). Lines 1-22, 18A-22, 139-26, 149-25, 149-26. ISBN 0-8063-1752-3.

Peerage of England
| New creation | Earl of Lincoln; 1141–1143 | Succeeded by William de Roumare |
| New creation | Earl of Arundel c. 1143 – 1176 | Succeeded by William d'Aubigny |
