= Geoffrey de Mowbray (died 1300) =

Sir Geoffrey de Mowbray (Note: Also Geoffrey de Moubray and Galfrid de Mowbray) (died 1300), Justiciar of Lothian, Baron of Dalmeny, Lord of Barnbougle and Inverkeithing was a 13th-14th century Scottish noble.

== Life ==
Mowbray was appointed at the Scone parliament of 2 April 1286, together with the bishop of Brechin, the abbot of Jedburgh to seek out King Edward I of England in Gascony and ask for his advice and protection and liberty of Penrith. They were received by Edward I on 15 September 1286 in Saintes, Gascony.

He was one of the sealers of Treaty of Birgham, intended to secure the independence of Scotland after the death of King Alexander III and the accession of his granddaughter Margaret in 1286.

Geoffrey also ratified at the Scottish parliament at Dunferline, the treaty between France and Scotland on 23 February 1296.

He was part of the inner circle of the Balliol administration, during the reign of King John Balliol.

On 25 September 1298, his Scottish lands were forfeited and granted by Edward I to Guy de Beauchamp, Earl of Warwick for taking arms against the King of England. The lands were later restored. Geoffrey was known to hold lands at Eckford in Roxburgh, Barnbougle and Dalmeny, Inverkeithing, Cessford and Eckford, Methven, Kellie and Kirk Michael in Scotland and Bolton in Cumberland in England. He had inherited Bolton from his uncle Roger de Mowbray, who was cousin to Thomas de Lascelles.

Geoffrey is known to have died before June 1300.

== Marriage and issue ==
Geoffrey married the second daughter of John I Comyn, Lord of Badenoch and his wife Alice, they are known to have had the following known issue:

- William de Mowbray died without issue;
- John de Mowbray died without issue;
- Roger de Mowbray (died 1320), had issue;
- Phillip de Mowbray of Red Castle, Angus (died 1318), married Eva de Umfraville, had issue;
- Geoffrey de Mowbray, Friar of the Order of Preachers (Dominican Order).

== Sources ==
- Barrow, Geoffrey Wallis Stewart (1965). Robert Bruce: And the Community of the Realm of Scotland. Berkeley, CA. doi:10.1525/9780520316348. ISBN 978-0-520-31634-8. OCLC 1149451423. S2CID 251187253.
- Barrow, Geoffrey Wallis Stewart (October 1990). "Studies Commemorative of the Anniversary of the Death of the Maid of Norway". The Scottish Historical Review. 69 (188 Part 2).
- Dowds, T. J. (2014). The origins of Scotland's national identity. Rothersthorpe: T. J. Dowds, Paragon. ISBN 978-1-78222-187-6. OCLC 876143438.
- Young, Alan (1997). Robert the Bruce's rivals: the Comyns, 1212–1314. East Linton, Scotland: Tuckwell Press. ISBN 1-86232-053-5. OCLC 37976670.
