= Mowbray River =

Coordinates: 43°53′S 170°59′E

Location
- Country: New Zealand

Physical characteristics
- Source
  - location: Four Peaks Range
- Mouth
  - location: Orari River
- Length: 14 km (8.7 mi)

The Mowbray River is a river of the south Canterbury region of New Zealand's South Island. A short upper tributary of the Orari River, it flows north from its sources in the Four Peaks Range northeast of Fairlie.

== See also ==
- List of rivers of New Zealand
