= Roger de Mowbray, 1st Baron Mowbray =

English nobleman and soldier (1254–1297)

Arms of Mowbray: Gules, a lion rampant argent

Roger de Mowbray, 1st Baron Mowbray (1254 – 21 November 1297), was an English peer and soldier.

The son of another Roger de Mowbray, and grandson of William de Mowbray, he served in the Welsh and Gascon Wars. He was summoned to the Parliament of Simon de Montfort in 1265, but such summonses have later been declared void. However, in 1283 he was summoned to Parliament by King Edward I as Lord Mowbray.

Mowbray married Rose, a daughter of Richard de Clare, 6th Earl of Gloucester. They had at least two children:

- John, who succeeded his father to the barony
- Alexander, who apparently took up residence in Scotland.

Roger de Mowbray was buried in Fountains Abbey.

== See also ==
- House of Mowbray

Peerage of England
New creation	Baron Mowbray; 1295–1297	Succeeded by John Mowbray I
