= Roger de Mowbray (died 1320) =

- Died: 1320
- Noble family: Mowbray
- Issue: John, Geoffrey and Alexander
- Father: Geoffrey de Mowbray
- Mother: a daughter of John Comyn, Lord of Badenoch

Sir Roger de Mowbray of Barnbougle and Dalmeny (d. 1320), was 13th-14th century Scottish noble. He was tried for treason against King Robert I of Scotland having died of wounds suffered during his capture.

== Life ==
Roger was the son of Geoffrey de Mowbray and a daughter of John Comyn, Lord of Badenoch and Alice de Ros.

He held the office of Standard Bearer of Scotland and signed the Declaration of Arbroath in 1320 and then was arrested later in 1320 for treason for plotting to overthrow King Robert I. He died of wounds suffered during his arrest. Roger's corpse was brought to Parliament in a litter and was found guilty and sentenced to be drawn, hanged and beheaded. King Robert I gave clemency and his body was allowed to be buried. His lands of Barnbougle and Dalmeny, Inverkeithing, Cessford and Eckford, Methven, Kellie and Kirk Michael were forfeited to the Crown.

Roger is known to have had three sons; John, Geoffrey and Alexander. A concession of dispensation for marriage between Roger and Margaret, daughter of Alexander of Abernethy was granted in 1312.
