= Saint-Martin-d'Aubigny =

- Commune
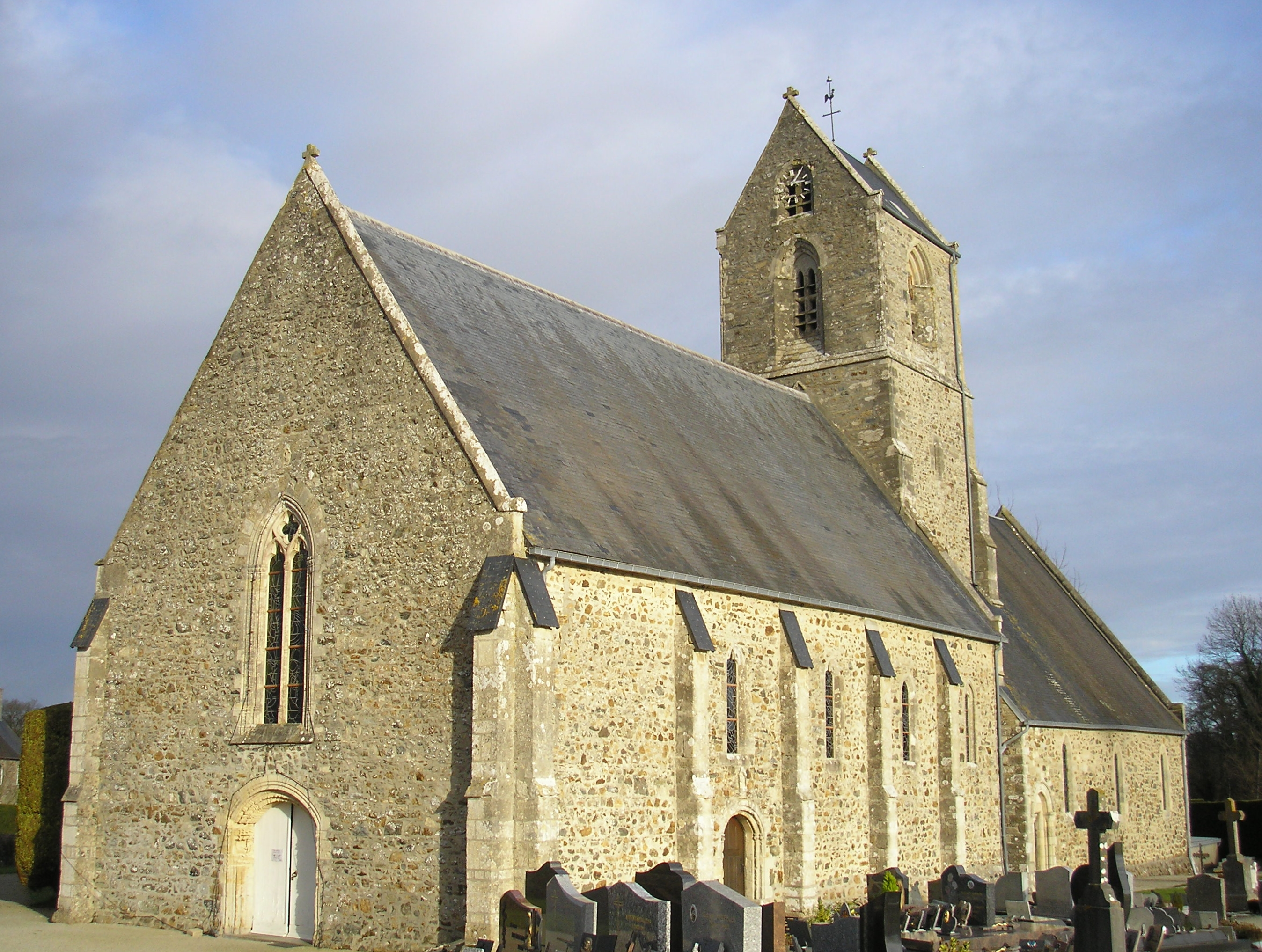
- The church in Saint-Martin-d'Aubigny

- Coat of arms
- Location of Saint-Martin-d'Aubigny
- Location within France Location within Normandy
- Coordinates: 49°09′57″N 1°20′56″W
- Country: France
- Region: Normandy
- Department: Manche
- Arrondissement: Coutances
- Canton: Agon-Coutainville

Government
  - Mayor (2020–2026): Bruno Hamel
- Area^{1}: 15.16 km^{2} (5.85 sq mi)
- Elevation: 33 m (108 ft)
- Highest elevation: 89 m (292 ft)
- Lowest elevation: 10 m (33 ft)
- Population (2023): 606
  - Density: 40.0/km^{2} (104/sq mi)
- Time zone: UTC+01:00 (CET)
  - Summer (DST): UTC+02:00 (CEST)
- INSEE/Postal code: 50510 /50190
- ^{1} French Land Register data, which excludes lakes, ponds, glaciers > 1 km^{2} (0.386 sq mi or 247 acres) and river estuaries.

Saint-Martin-d'Aubigny (French pronunciation: [sɛ̃ maʁtɛ̃ dobiɲi]) is a commune in the Manche department in Normandy in north-western France.

== History ==
The name of Aubigny is mentioned under diverse forms in Medieval Latin and in Old French : Albignio (11th century); Albigneio (ab. 1175); Aubigni (ab 1180). Its original form was *Albiniācum, a Romanization of the name of an earlier Gallo-Roman property (suffix -(i)acum < Gaulish Celtic -ako) + the personal name of its owner, a certain Albinius, Latin personal name popular in Gaul at that time.

== See also ==
- Communes of the Manche department
