= John Mowbray, 2nd Baron Mowbray =

English peer (1286–1322)

Arms of Mowbray: Gules, a lion rampant argent

John (I) de Mowbray, 2nd Baron Mowbray (4 September 1286 – 23 March 1322) was the son of Roger de Mowbray, 1st Baron Mowbray. Lord of the manors of Tanfield and Well, Yorkshire.

De Mowbray served in the Scottish wars of Edward I. The baron held such offices as sheriff of Yorkshire, governor of the city of York, a warden of the Scottish marches, and governor of Malton and Scarborough Castles.

He took part in the rebellion of Thomas, Earl of Lancaster. He was captured at the Battle of Boroughbridge and subsequently hanged at York.

John de Mowbray married Aline de Braose, (b. 1291 d. ca 1331), daughter of William de Braose, 2nd Baron Braose and Lord of Gower. They had at least two sons:

- John, (b. 29 November 1310, Yorkshire, England d.1361 who succeeded his father to the barony.
- Alexander, (c. 1314 – c. 1391.)

John de Mowbray was buried at Greyfriar's in York. The church was destroyed under Henry VIII's rule, and its grounds are now covered by the city's train station.

== Bibliography ==
- Burke, Sir Bernard. "Mowbray-Earls of Nottingham, Dukes of Norfolk, Earls-Marshal, Earls of Warren and Surrey." A Genealogical History of the Dormant, Abeyant, Forfeited, and Extinct Peerages, of the British Empire. London: Wm Clowes and Sons, Ltd, 1962. p. 387.
- Cokayne, G.E., ed. (1936). The Complete Peerage. Vol. 9. Revised and enlarged by H.A. Doubleday and Lord Howard de Walden (2nd ed.). London: St. Catherine Press.

Peerage of England
Preceded by Roger de Mowbray III	Baron Mowbray; 1297–1322	Succeeded by John Mowbray II
