= House of Mowbray =

Anglo-Norman noble family

- Noble house
- Country: Duchy of Normandy; Kingdom of England
- Founder: Roger de Mowbray
- Titles: Various
- Styles: Dukes, Earls, Barons, and Knights
- Estates: Various Dukedoms, Earldoms, and Baronies

The House of Mowbray (/ˈmoʊbri/) was an Anglo-Norman noble house, derived from Montbray in Normandy and founded by Roger de Mowbray, son of Nigel d'Aubigny.

== Foundations ==
Arms granted by Richard II to Thomas de Mowbray, 1st Duke of Norfolk.

Following the Norman Conquest of England, Geoffrey de Montbray, bishop of Coutances, was granted some 280 English manors. His heir, his brother Roger's son, Robert de Mowbray, Earl of Northumbria, was forfeited and imprisoned for life on rebelling in 1095. His lands were confiscated and he was forced to divorce his wife, Matilda de L'Aigle, daughter of Richer, Lord of L'Aigle. His Mowbray lands were granted to her new husband, a royal favourite, Nigel d'Aubigny.

Nigel d'Aubigny was son of Roger d'Aubigny (of Saint-Martin-d'Aubigny) and with his brother William was an ardent supporter of Henry I. The brothers were rewarded with great estates in England. William was made king's butler, and was father of William d'Aubigny, 1st Earl of Arundel; Nigel was rewarded with marriage to the former wife of the imprisoned Robert de Mowbray, and with the escheated Norman fief of her former husband, also being give a number of lands in England. After a decade of childless marriage, he divorced Matilda, remarrying in 1118 to Gundred de Gournay (died 1155), daughter of Gerard de Gournay, lord of Gournay. They had one son, Roger, who inherited the Mowbray lands in Normandy and took the Mowbray surname.

Thomas de Mowbray, 1st Duke of Norfolk as Earl of Nottingham. Surrey Roll (ca.1395), quartering the new and old Mowbray arms

Roger, a great lord with a hundred knight's fees, was captured with King Stephen at the battle of Lincoln, joined the rebellion against Henry II (1173), founded abbeys, and went on crusade. His grandson William, a leader in the rising against King John, was one of the 25 barons of the Magna Carta, as was his brother Roger, and was captured fighting against Henry III at the rout of Lincoln (1217).

== Lords Mowbray ==
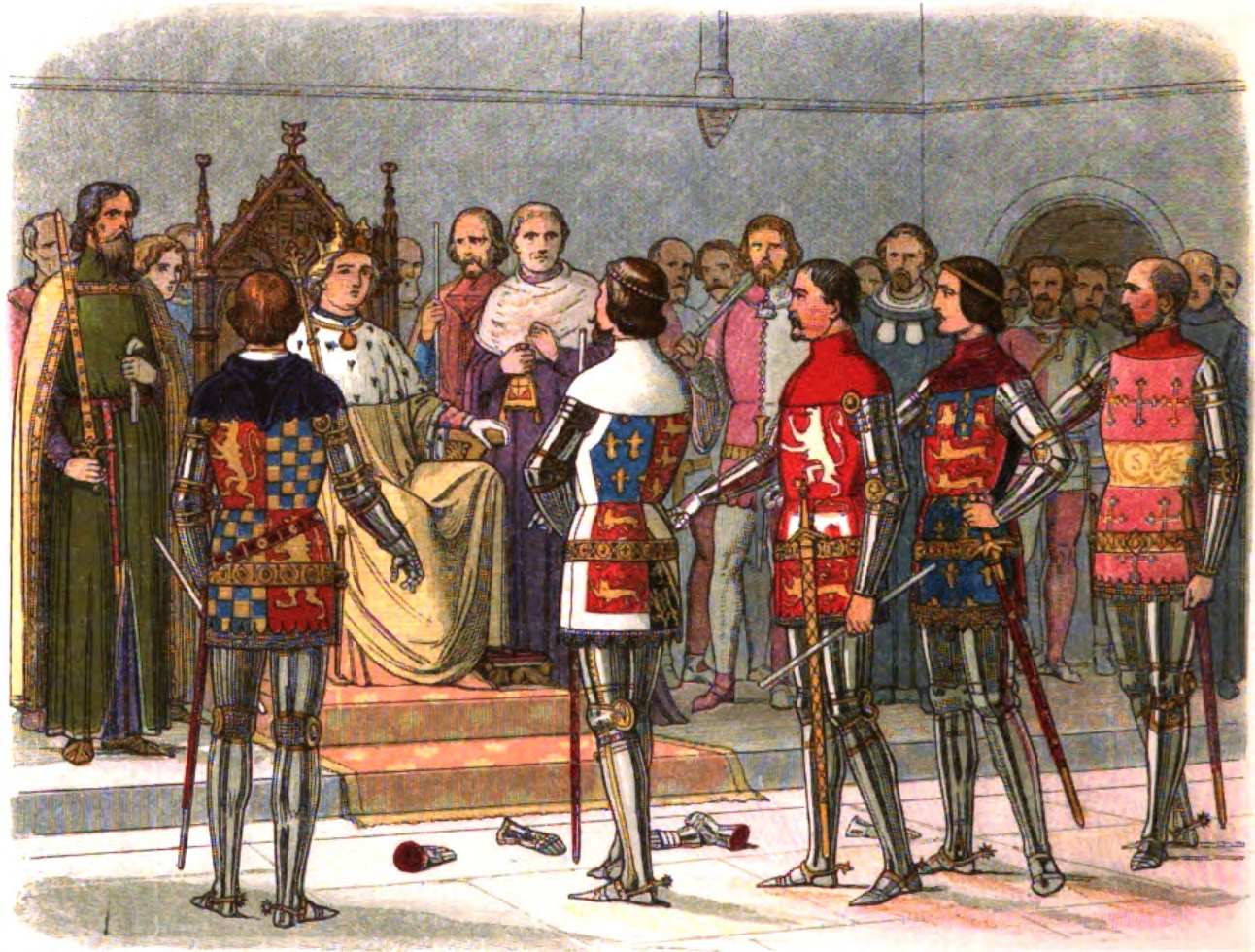
Richard FitzAlan, 11th Earl of Arundel; Thomas of Woodstock, 1st Duke of Gloucester; Thomas de Mowbray, Earl of Nottingham; Henry, Earl of Derby (later Henry IV); and Thomas de Beauchamp, 12th Earl of Warwick, demand that Richard II let them prove by arms the justice of their rebellion

William's grandson Roger de Mowbray (1266–1298), was summoned to parliament by Edward I, by which act he is held to have become the first Lord Mowbray. He was father of John (1286–1322), a warrior and warden of the Scottish March, who, joining in Thomas of Lancaster's revolt, was captured at Boroughbridge and hanged. His wife, a Braose heiress, added Gower in South Wales and the Bramber lordship in Sussex to the great possessions of his house. Their son John de Mowbray, 3rd Baron Mowbray (d. 1361) was father, by Joan of Lancaster, a daughter of Henry, 3rd Earl of Lancaster, of John, Lord Mowbray (c. 1328–1368), whose marriage with the heiress of John de Segrave, 4th Baron Segrave, by the heiress of Edward I's son Thomas, earl of Norfolk and marshal of England, further increased the family's wealth and property. In addition to a vast accession to their lands, the earldom of Nottingham and the marshalship of England were bestowed on them by Richard II, and the dukedom of Norfolk followed.

The 1st duke left two sons, of whom Thomas the elder was only recognized as earl marshal. Beheaded for joining in Scrope's conspiracy against Henry IV (1405), he was succeeded by his brother John, who was restored to the dukedom of Norfolk in 1424. His son John, the third duke, was father of John, 4th and last duke, who was created earl of Warenne and Surrey in his father's lifetime (1451). At his death (1481) his vast inheritance devolved on his only child Anne, who was married as an infant to Edward IV's younger son Richard (created duke of Norfolk and earl of Nottingham and Warenne), but died in 1481.

The next heirs of the Mowbrays were then the Howards and the Berkeleys, representing the two daughters of the first duke. Between them were divided the estates of the house, the Mowbray dukedom of Norfolk and earldom of Surrey being also revived for the Howards (1483), and the earldom of Nottingham (1483) and earl marshalship (1485) for the Berkeleys. Both families assumed the baronies of Mowbray and Segrave, but Henry Howard was summoned in his father's lifetime (1640) as Lord Mowbray, which was deemed a recognition of the Howards' right; their co-heirs, from 1777, were the Lords Stourton and the Lords Petre, and in 1878 Lord Stourton was summoned as Lord Mowbray and Segrave.

The former dignity is claimed as the premier barony, though De Ros ranks before it. Lord Stourton's son claimed, but unsuccessfully, in 1901–1906 the earldom of Norfolk (1312), also through the Mowbrays. Of the Mowbray estates, the castle and lordship of Bramber is still vested in the dukes of Norfolk.

The current Baron of Mowbray is James Stourton, 28th Baron Mowbray, 29th Baron Segrave and 25th Baron Stourton (2021–present).

== Notable Mowbray family members ==
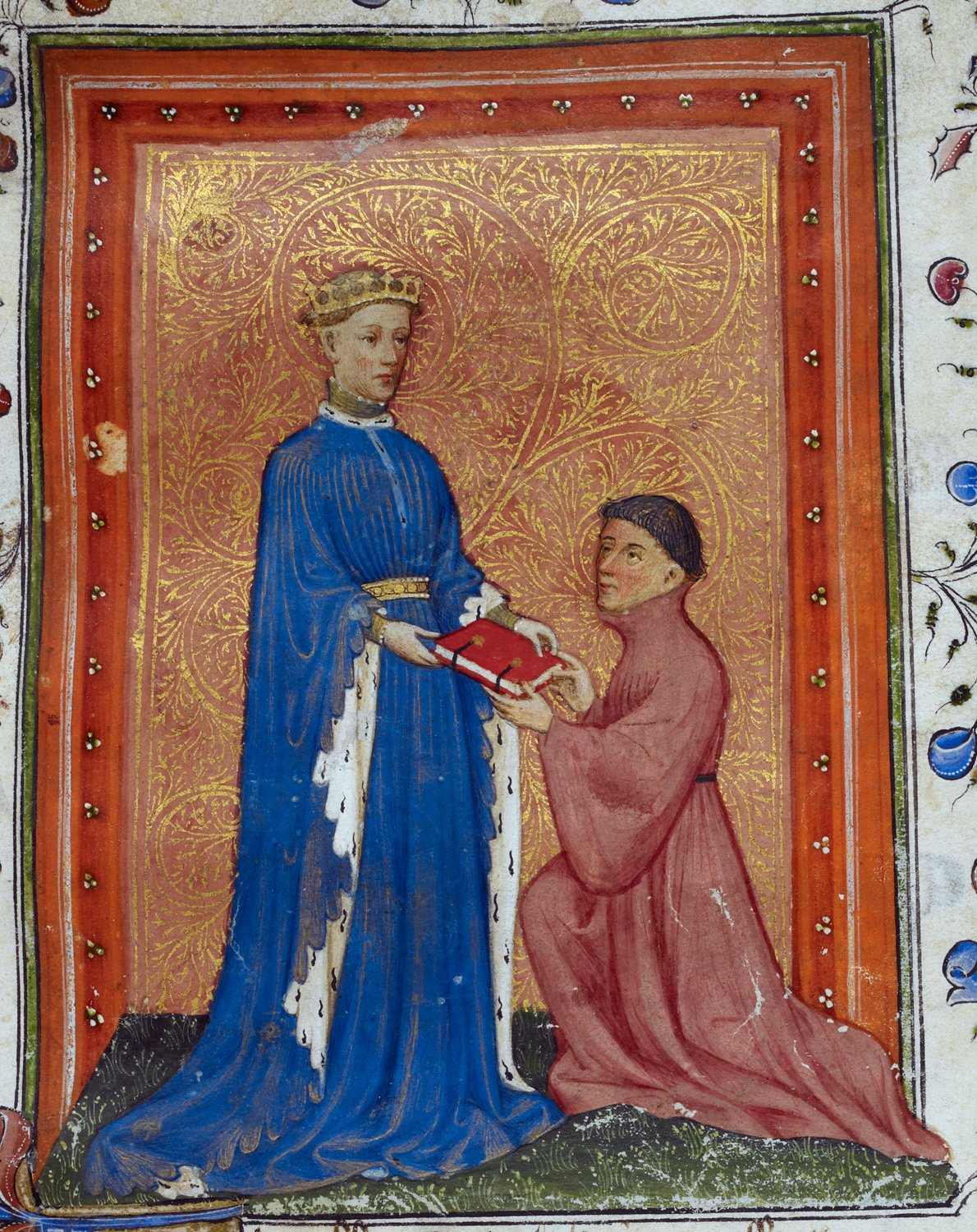
Henry V, while Prince of Wales, presenting Thomas Hoccleve's, Regement of Princes to John de Mowbray, 2nd Duke of Norfolk, 1411–1413. British Library

- Nigel d'Aubigny, lord of Mowbray (d.1129)
- Roger de Mowbray, lord of Mowbray (d.1188)
- William de Mowbray, lord of Mowbray (d.ca.1224)
- Roger de Mowbray, 1st Baron Mowbray (d.1298)
- John de Mowbray, 2nd Baron Mowbray (d.1322)
- John de Mowbray, 3rd Baron Mowbray (d.1361)
- John de Mowbray, 4th Baron Mowbray (d.1368)
- John Mowbray, 1st Earl of Nottingham, 5th Baron Mowbray (d.1383)
- Thomas Mowbray, 1st Duke of Norfolk, Earl of Nottingham and Norfolk, Baron Segrave and 6th Baron Mowbray (d.1399)
- Thomas Mowbray, 4th Earl of Norfolk, Earl of Nottingham, Baron Segrave and 7th Baron Mowbray (d.1405)
- John Mowbray, 2nd Duke of Norfolk, Earl of Norfolk, Baron Segrave and 8th Baron Mowbray (d.1432)
- John Mowbray, 3rd Duke of Norfolk, Earl of Nottingham and Norfolk, Baron Segrave and 9th Baron Mowbray (d.1461)
- John Mowbray, 4th Duke of Norfolk, Earl of Nottingham, Norfolk, Surrey and Warenne, Baron Segrave and 10th Baron Mowbray (d.1476)
- Anne de Mowbray, 8th Countess of Norfolk, Baroness Segrave and 11th Baroness Mowbray (d.1481)

== Tree of House of Mowbray ==
House of Mowbray

Roger de Montbray	Geoffrey de Montbray; Bishop of Coutances (d. 1093)	Roger d'Aubigny
Robert de Mowbray; Earl of Northumbria (d. 1125)	Matilda de l'Aigle	Nigel d'Aubigny (d.1121)	Gundred de Gournay (d. 1155)	William d'Aubigny; Pincerna (d. 1139)
Roger de Mowbray (d. 1188)	William d'Aubigny; Earl of Arundel (d. 1176)
Nigel de Mowbray (d. 1191)	Robert de Mowbray
William de Mowbray; Magna Carta Surety (c. 1173-1224)	Philip de Mowbray	Robert de Mowbray
Nigel de Mowbray (d. 1230)	Roger de Mowbray (d.1266)
Roger de Mowbray; 1st Baron Mowbray (d. 1297)
John de Mowbray; 2nd Baron Mowbray (1286-1324)
John de Mowbray; 3rd Baron Mowbray (1310-1361)
John de Mowbray; 4th Baron Mowbray (1340–1368)
John de Mowbray; 5th Baron Mowbray; 6th Baron Segrave; 1st Earl of Nottingham (1365–1383)	Thomas de Mowbray; 6th Baron Mowbray; 7th Baron Segrave; 1st Earl of Nottingham; 3rd Earl of Norfolk; 1st Duke of Norfolk (c. 1368–1399)
Thomas de Mowbray; 7th Baron Mowbray; 8th Baron Segrave; 2nd Earl of Nottingham; 4th Earl of Norfolk (1385–1405)	John de Mowbray; 8th Baron Mowbray; 9th Baron Segrave; 3rd Earl of Nottingham; 5th Earl of Norfolk; 2nd Duke of Norfolk (1392–1432)	Margaret de Mowbray (d. 1459) m. Robert Howard	Isabel de Mowbray (d. 1452) m1. Henry Ferrers m2. James Berkeley; 1st Baron Berkeley
(progeny were eventual Mowbray heirs)
John de Mowbray; 9th Baron Mowbray; 10th Baron Segrave; 4th Earl of Nottingham; 6th Earl of Norfolk; 3rd Duke of Norfolk (1415–1461)
King Edward IV; 1442–1483	John de Mowbray; 10th Baron Mowbray; 11th Baron Segrave; 1st Earl of Surrey and Warenne; 5th Earl of Nottingham; 7th Earl of Norfolk; 4th Duke of Norfolk (1444–1476)
Richard of Shrewsbury; 1st Duke of York; 1st Duke of Norfolk; 1st Earl Warenne; 1st Earl of Nottingham (1473–1483)	Anne de Mowbray; 11th Baroness Mowbray; 12th Baroness Segrave; 8th Countess of Norfolk (1472–1481)
