= Roger de Mowbray (died 1188) =

12th-century English nobleman

- Born: c. 1120
- Died: 1188; Tyre, Lebanon
- Wars and battles: Battle of the Standard; Battle of Lincoln (1141); Second Crusade; Revolt of 1173–74; Battle of Hattin
- Parents: Nigel d'Aubigny and Gundreda de Gournay

Sir Roger de Mowbray (c. 1120–1188) was an Anglo-Norman magnate. He had substantial English landholdings. A supporter of King Stephen, with whom he was captured at Lincoln in 1141, he rebelled against Henry II. He made multiple religious foundations in Yorkshire. He took part in the Second Crusade and later returned to the Holy Land, where he was captured and died in 1187.

== Family and early life ==
Roger was the son of Nigel d'Aubigny by his second wife, Gundreda de Gournay.

On his father's death in 1129 he became a ward of the crown. Based at Thirsk with his mother, on reaching his majority in 1138, he took title to the lands awarded to his father by Henry I both in Normandy including Montbray, from which he would adopt his surname, as well as the substantial holdings in Yorkshire and around Melton.

== Career under Stephen ==
Soon after, in 1138, he participated in the Battle of the Standard against the Scots and, according to Aelred of Rievaulx, acquitted himself honourably.

Thereafter, Roger's military fortunes were mixed. Whilst acknowledged as a competent and prodigious fighter, he generally found himself on the losing side in his subsequent engagements. During the anarchic reign of King Stephen he was captured with Stephen at the battle of Lincoln in 1141.

Soon after his release, Roger married Alice de Gant (d. c. 1181), widow of Ilbert de Lacy and daughter of Walter de Gant. Roger and Alice had two sons, Nigel and Robert. Roger also had at least one daughter, donating his lands at Granville to the Abbaye aux Dames in Caen when she became a nun there.

In 1147, he was one of the few English nobles to join Louis VII of France on the Second Crusade. He gained further acclaim, according to John of Hexham, defeating a Muslim leader in single combat.

== Career under Henry II ==
Roger supported the Revolt of 1173–74 against Henry II and fought with his sons, Nigel and Robert, but they were defeated at Kinardferry, Kirkby Malzeard and Thirsk.

Roger left for the Holy Land again in 1186, but encountered further misfortune being captured at the Battle of Hattin in 1187. His ransom was met by the Templars, but he died soon after and, according to some accounts, was buried at Tyre in Palestine. There is, however, some controversy surrounding his death and burial and final resting-place.

== Legacy ==
Mowbray was a significant benefactor and supporter of several religious institutions in Yorkshire including Fountains Abbey. With his mother he sheltered the monks of Calder, fleeing before the Scots in 1138, and supported their establishment at Byland Abbey in 1143. Later, in 1147, he facilitated their relocation to Coxwold.

In 1127 he founded the Cistercian abbey at Villers-Canivet.

Roger made a generous donation of two carucates of land (c.240 acres), a house and two mills to the Order of Saint Lazarus, headquartered at Burton St Lazarus Hospital in Leicestershire, after his return from the crusades in 1150. His cousin William d'Aubigny, 1st Earl of Arundel and his wife Adeliza, the widow of King Henry I, had been amongst the earliest patrons of the order and, when combined with Roger's experiences in the Holy Land, may have encouraged his charity. His family continued to support the Order for many generations and the Mowbrays lion rampant coat of arms was adopted by the Hospital of Burton St Lazars alongside their more usual green cross.

He also supported the Knights Templar and gave them land in Warwickshire where they founded Temple Balsall.

In total, Roger is credited with assisting the establishment of thirty-five churches.

The House of Mowbray, the senior line of which would become Barons Mowbray, descended from Roger's son Nigel, who died on crusade at Acre in 1191.

== See also ==
- House of Mowbray
