= John Fitzalan =

John Fitzalan or John FitzAlan may refer to:

- John Fitzalan (died 1240) (1200–1240), Lord of Oswestry
- John Fitzalan, 6th Earl of Arundel (1385–1421), Lord of Oswestry and Clun, Breton-English nobleman
- John Fitzalan, 7th Earl of Arundel (1408–1435), English nobleman
- John FitzAlan, 1st Baron Arundel (c. 1348–1379), Marshal of England
- John FitzAlan, 2nd Baron Arundel (1364–1390)
- John Fitzalan (1246–1272), Lord of Arundel
- John Fitzalan (1223–1267), Lord of Oswestry, Clun, and Arundel
