= John Fitzalan, 7th Earl of Arundel =

English noble

The Earl of Arundel KG
- 7th Earl of Arundel
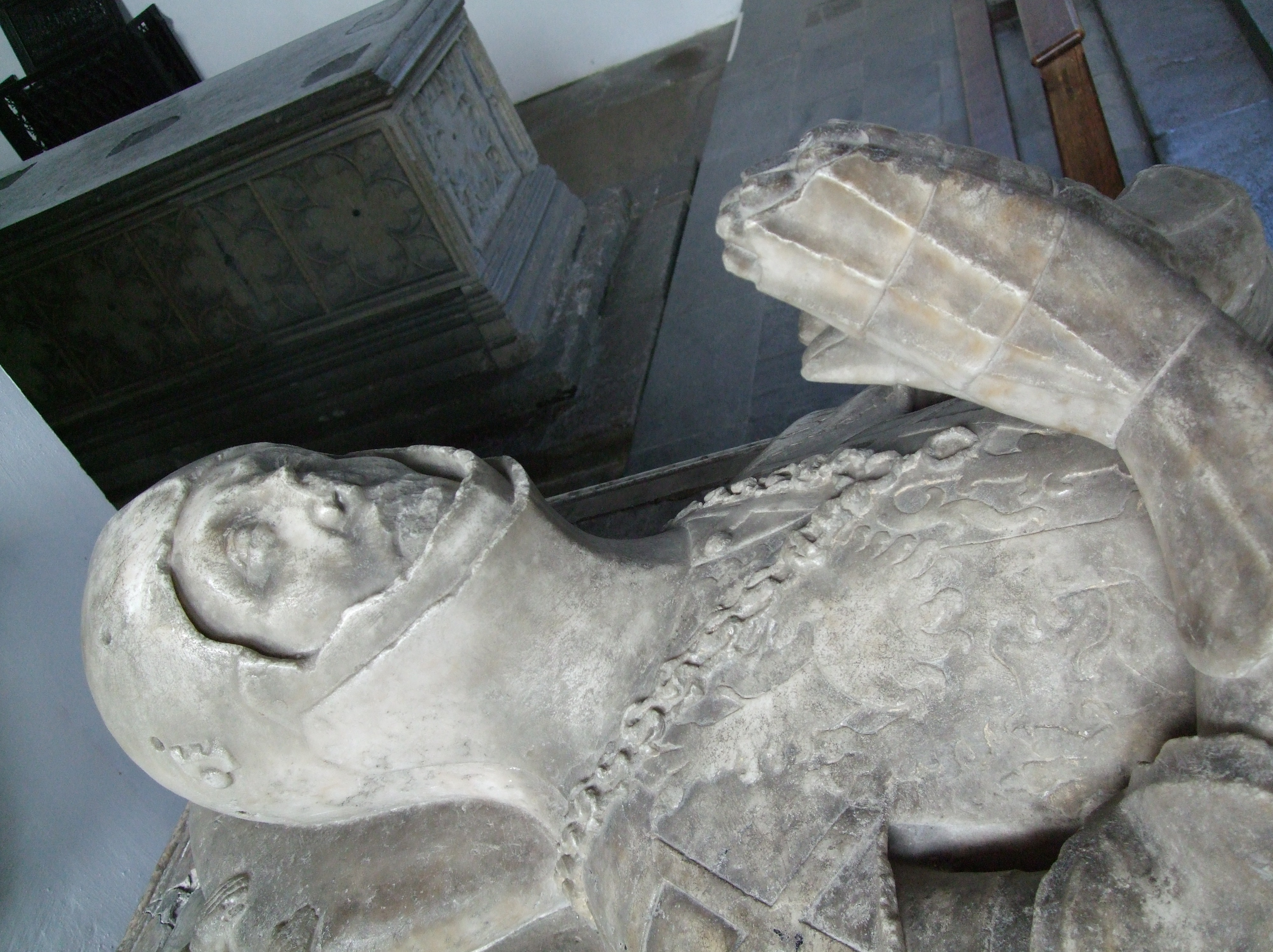
- John FitzAlan's funeral effigy in Arundel Castle
- Tenure: 1433–1435
- Other titles: Baron Maltravers; Duke of Touraine
- Known for: Military service in the Hundred Years' War
- Years active: 1430–1435
- Born: 14 February 1408; Lytchett Matravers, Dorset, England
- Died: 12 June 1435 (aged 27); Beauvais, France
- Cause of death: Wounded in battle
- Buried: Fitzalan Chapel, Arundel Castle, Sussex; 50°51′22″N 0°33′13″W
- Residence: Arundel Castle
- Wars and battles: Hundred Years' War • Siege of Compiègne • Battle of Gerbevoy
- Spouses: Constance Fanhope; Maud Lovell
- Issue: Humphrey Fitzalan, 8th Earl
- Parents: John Fitzalan, 6th Earl; Eleanor Berkeley

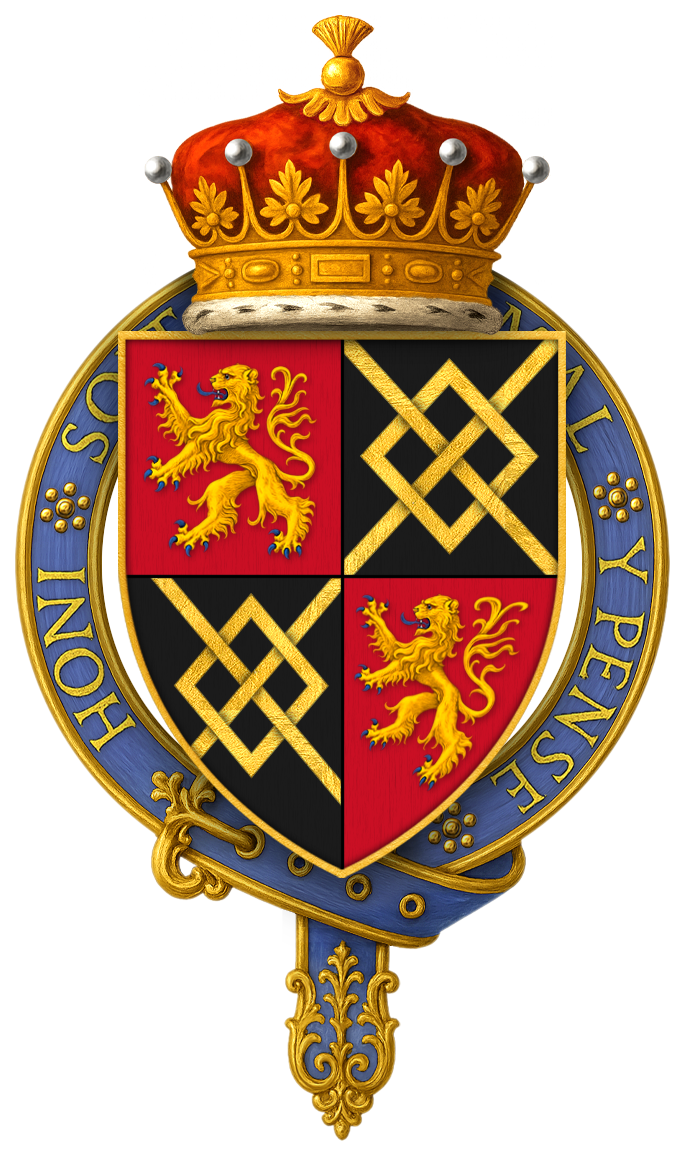
Arms of Sir John FitzAlan, 7th Earl of Arundel, KG - 1 and 4, gules a lion rampant or (FitzAlan); 2 and 3, sable, a fret or (Maltravers)

John Fitzalan, 7th Earl of Arundel, 4th Baron Maltravers KG (14 February 1408 – 12 June 1435), was an English nobleman and military commander during the later phases of the Hundred Years' War. His father, John Fitzalan, 3rd Baron Maltravers, fought a long battle to lay claim to the Arundel earldom, a battle that was not finally resolved until after the father's death, when John Fitzalan the son was finally confirmed in the title in 1433.

Already before this, in 1430, Fitzalan had departed for France, where he held a series of important command positions. He served under John, Duke of Bedford, the uncle of the eight-year-old King Henry VI. Fitzalan was involved in recovering fortresses in the Île-de-France region, and in suppressing local rebellions. His military career ended, however, at the Battle of Gerbevoy in 1435. Refusing to retreat in the face of superior forces, Arundel was shot in the foot and captured. His leg was later amputated, and he died shortly afterwards from the injury. His final resting place was a matter of dispute until the mid-nineteenth century, when his tomb at Arundel Castle was revealed to contain a skeleton missing one leg.

Arundel was considered a great soldier by his contemporaries. He had been a successful commander in France, in a period of decline for the English, and his death was a great loss to his country. He was succeeded by his son Humphrey, who did not live to adulthood. The title of Earl of Arundel then went to John's younger brother, William.

== Family background ==
John Fitzalan was born at Lytchett Matravers in Dorset on 14 February 1408. He was the son of John Fitzalan, 3rd Baron Maltravers (1385–1421) and Eleanor (d. 1455), daughter of Sir John Berkeley of Beverstone, Gloucestershire. John Fitzalan the elder, through his great-great-grandfather Richard FitzAlan, 4th Earl of Arundel, made a claim on the earldom of Arundel after the death of Thomas Fitzalan, 5th Earl of Arundel, in 1415. The claim was disputed, however, by Thomas's three sisters and their families, foremost among these Elizabeth FitzAlan, who had married Thomas de Mowbray, 1st Duke of Norfolk. It is debatable whether Maltravers ever held the title of Earl of Arundel; he was summoned to parliament under this title once, in 1416, but never again. When he died in 1421, the dispute continued under his son, and it was not until 1433 that the younger John FitzAlan finally had his title confirmed in parliament, despite the Mowbrays disputing his claim. Four years earlier, in July 1429, he had received his late father's estates and title.

As a child, John Fitzalan was contracted to marry Constance, who was the daughter of John Cornwall, Baron Fanhope, and through her mother Elizabeth granddaughter of John of Gaunt. The two may or may not have married, but Constance was dead by 1429, when John married Maud, daughter of Robert Lovell.

FitzAlan was knighted in 1426 along with the four-year-old King Henry VI, where he was referred to as "Dominus de Maultravers" ("Lord Maltravers"). In the summer of 1429, he was summoned to parliament, this time styled "Johanni Arundell' Chivaler", meaning he was now Lord Arundel.

In 1430, however, in an indenture for service with the king in France, he was styled Earl of Arundel, a title he also used himself. When he was finally officially recognised in his title of Earl of Arundel in 1433, this was based on the recognition that the title went with the possession of Arundel Castle. In reality though, the grant was just as much a reward for the military services he had by that point rendered in France.

== Service in France ==
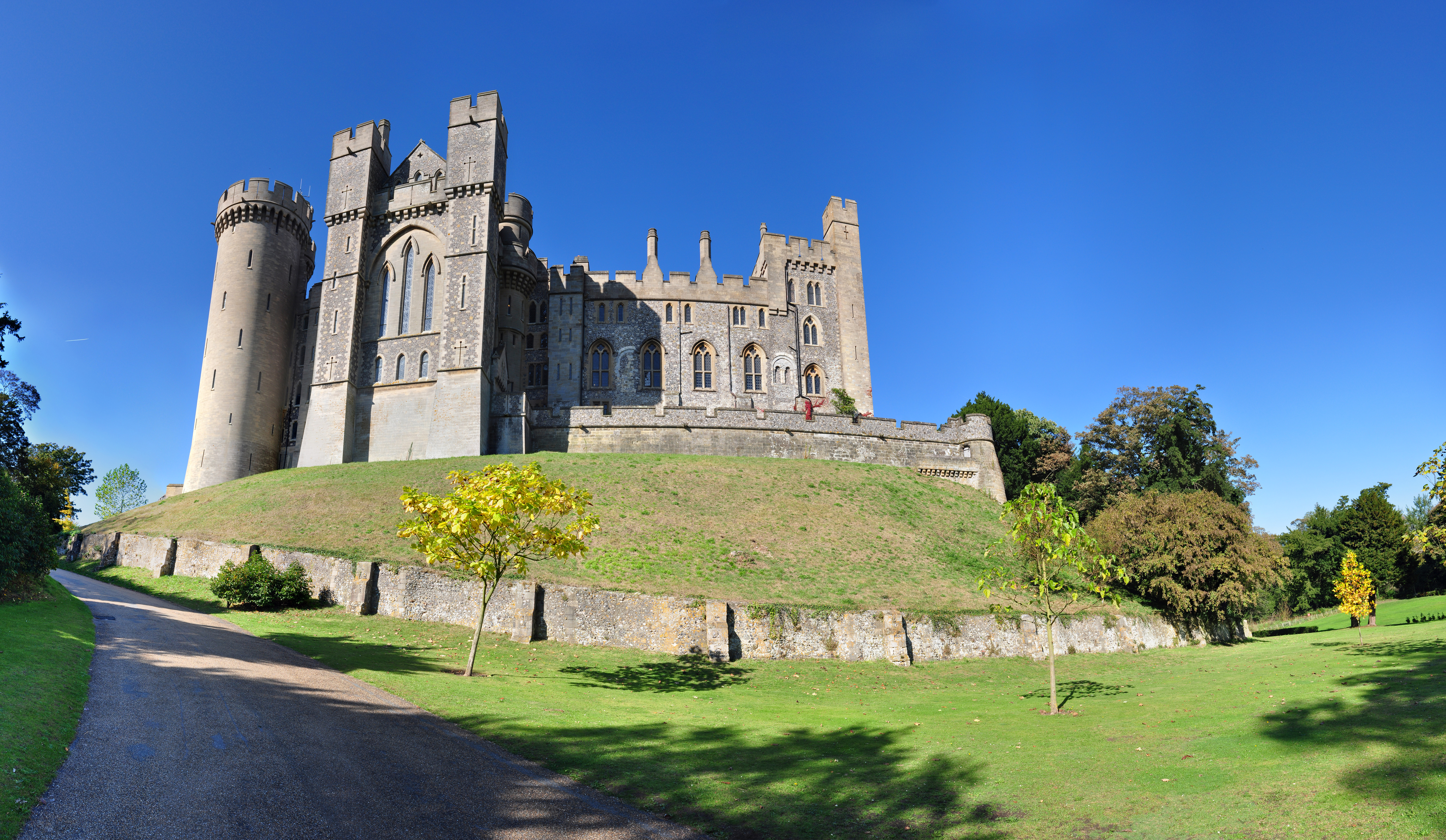
Arundel Castle was the main residence of the FitzAlan family, but John FitzAlan spent most of the years from 1430 until his death in France.

John Fitzalan the father had been a prominent soldier in the Hundred Years' War under King Henry V, and the son followed in his father's footsteps. On 23 April 1430, the younger Fitzalan departed for France in the company of the Earl of Huntingdon. There he soon made a name for himself as a soldier, under the command of the king's uncle, John, Duke of Bedford. In June, he took part in the Siege of Compiègne, where Joan of Arc had recently been captured. Later, he raised the siege of Anglure with the help of the Burgundians. On 17 December 1431, he was present when Henry VI was crowned King of France in Paris, where he distinguished himself at the accompanying tournament. FitzAlan's military success led to several important appointments of command; in November 1431, he was made lieutenant of the Rouen garrison, and shortly after also captain of Vernon. In January 1432 he was appointed captain of Verneuil. On the night of 3 February he was taken by surprise while in bed at the Great Tower of Rouen Castle, when a band of French soldiers from nearby Ricarville managed to take the castle. Arundel was hoisted down the walls in a basket, and made his escape. The assailants could not hold the castle, because Marshall Boussac refused to garrison the town; Guillaume de Ricarville was forced to surrender twelve days later. In April 1432, FitzAlan was rewarded for his actions so far by initiation into the Order of the Garter. In a separate action from Rouen Arundel was sent to rescue Saint Lo. from an attack by the duke of Alençon's army, after the town's captain Raoul Tesson had been appointed to replace Suffolk, who was captured at the Battle of Jargeau. The French retreated to the fastness of Mont St Michel, from where they continued to raid Anglo-Norman towns, like Granville in 1433.

From early 1432 onwards, Fitzalan held several regional commands in northern France. One of his tasks was recovering fortresses in the Île-de-France region, at which he was mostly successful. At Lagny-sur-Marne he blew up the bridge to prevent the citizens from reaching the castle, but still failed to take the fortification. In December he was appointed to a regional command in Upper Normandy, but had to defend the town of Sées from a siege. On 10 March 1433, he issued a pardon to the inhabitants when the town was retaken from the Armagnacs.

In July Arundel was instead made lieutenant-general of Lower Normandy. The earl continued his work of recovering lost fortresses that belonged to Ambroise de Loré, Bonsmoulins was taken easily, but Loré's family had occupied Saint-Céneri. After three months of culverin bombardment, the walls were breached and most of the garrison killed. The remainder were allowed to march out unharmed.

In the County of Alençon, a young, tall and courageous earl led the campaign that probably took place in 1433, taking back Saint-Célerin, Sillé-le-Guillaume, where there was a short skirmish. The Armagnacs arrived, and demanded the return of the hostages in the castle; Arundel feigned to agree and departed. As soon as the Armagnacs rode off Arundel returned and took the castle by assault. and by 1434 Beaumont-le-Vicomte. In December 1433, Bedford again appointed him commander in Upper Normandy, as well as captain of Pont-de-l'Arche.

By now the Earl of Arundel might have returned briefly to England in May 1434, when he was in the process of gathering troops for an English expedition to France. But John, Duke of Bedford was forced to raise loans for the soldiers' pay in the Maine campaign. That Spring he was joined in Paris by John Talbot, Earl of Shrewsbury with nearly 1000 reinforcements from England. Later in May he was replaced as lieutenant of Upper Normandy by Talbot, and instead received a command between the Seine and Loire rivers. This effectively meant that the two shared the command of Normandy, with Talbot east of the Seine and Arundel to the west. But they combined operations capturing Beaumont-sur-Oise, and then Creil, which was finally taken on 20 June 1434. In the summer Arundel captured the Mantes-Chartres regional fortresses; it appeared for a time at least the Armagnacs no longer posed a threat to Paris.

On 8 September, Arundel was also made Duke of Touraine – an area held by the French. The grant was made as a reward for his good service, but also in the hope that he would campaign in the area. In October he was made captain of Saint-Lô, where he had to deal with a rebellion in the Bessin area. The Duke of Alençon was trying to exploit the revolt to take control of Avranches, but Arundel managed to prevent the French advance and ended the rebellion.

But in early 1435 the area of western Normandy erupted in popular revolt. Arundel was summoned to call muster from Rouen in order to protect Caen. Arundel was joined by another lieutenant-general, Lord Scales, from his base at Domfront, commanded to relieve Avranches. Alençon intended to build a fortress at Savigny-le-Vieux, but when the English found out, the bailli of Cotentin was required to demolish it. With 800 men, Arundel was sent to recover Rue, where he learnt that La Hire was fortifying Gerberoy, only 37 miles east of Rouen. Talbot had previously cleared out the Picardy,, but when Arundel arrived he discovered to his surprise La Hire and Jean Poton de Xaintrailles had already occupied the fortress. He was forced to give battle or besiege.

== Death and aftermath ==
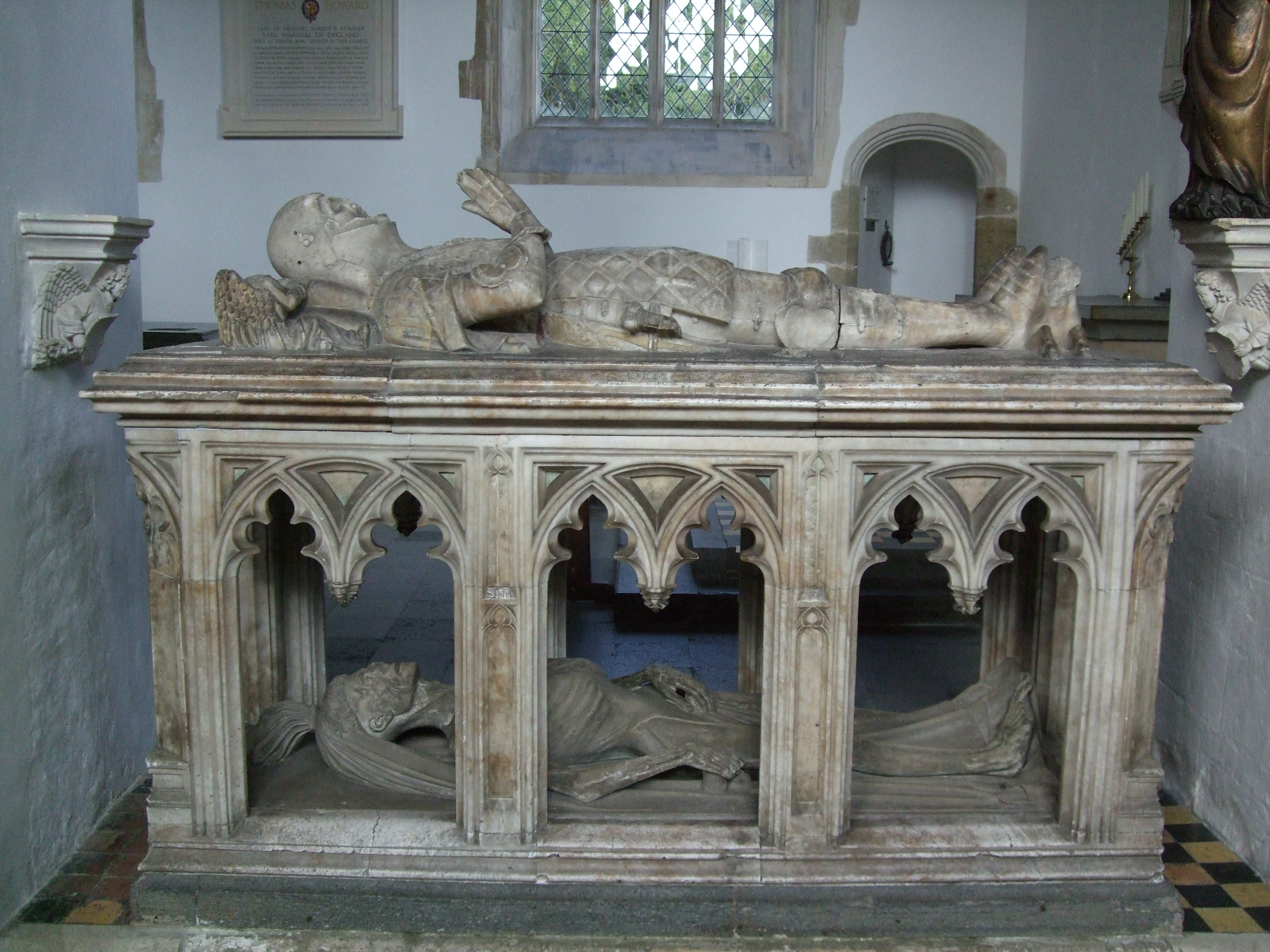
John FitzAlan's free-standing cadaver tomb was opened in 1857, to reveal a skeleton missing one leg.

On the night of 31 May/1 June 1435, Arundel was at Mantes-la-Jolie in the Île-de-France, when he was ordered to relocate north to Gournay-sur-Epte (now Gournay-en-Bray). When he was informed that the French had taken over the nearby fortress at Gerberoy, he moved quickly to attack it. The English met with a large French force at Gerberoy. Many withdrew to Gournay in panic, but Arundel remained to fight. In the ensuing battle, Arundel lost many of his men and was himself hit in the foot by a shot from a culverin, a primitive musket. Heavily wounded, he was taken to Beauvais as a captive of the French. According to the French historian Thomas Basin, Arundel was humiliated by his defeat and refused to receive medical treatment for the damage to his foot. The leg was eventually amputated, but this could not save Arundel's life; he died of his injuries on 12 June 1435, depriving the English of one of their youngest, most able and dedicated military leaders. Arundel was replaced in his command by Lord Scales.

There was long uncertainty about what had happened to the earl's body. The French chronicler Jehan de Waurin claimed that Arundel had simply been buried in Beauvais. In the mid-nineteenth century, however, the chaplain of the Duke of Norfolk came upon the will of Arundel's squire, Fulk Eyton, when he died later in 1454. Eyton maintained therein that he had secured the earl's body and brought it back to England, for which he had been rewarded with a payment of 1400 Marks. The body was disinterred, brought back to England, and then entombed in the Fitzalan Chapel of Arundel Castle, as Arundel had expressly wished for in his own will. On 16 November 1857, the tomb in the Arundel chapel carrying the earl's effigy was opened. In it was found a skeleton measuring over six feet, with a missing leg.

Arundel's military career coincided with a period of general decline for the English in France. He had been an unusually successful campaigner. His death was lamented in England and celebrated in France. He was referred to as the "English Achilles"; the historian Polydore Vergil called him "a man of singular valour, constancy, and gravity". With his wife, Maud, he had a son, Humphrey, who was born on 30 January 1429. Humphrey succeeded to his father's title, but died on 24 April 1438, while still a minor. John FitzAlan's younger brother, William, was next in line of succession. William was born in 1417 and was created Earl of Arundel in 1438 when he came of age.

== Fitzalan family tree ==
The following simplified family tree shows the background for the dispute over the Arundel title and inheritance. Solid lines denote children and dashed lines marriages.

Richard Fitzalan, 3rd Earl of Arundel (c. 1313–1376)
Richard Fitzalan, 4th Earl of Arundel (1346–1397)	John Fitzalan, 1st Baron Arundel (c. 1348–1379)
Thomas Fitzalan, 5th Earl of Arundel (1381–1415)	Elizabeth Fitzalan (1366–1425)	Thomas de Mowbray, 1st Duke of Norfolk (1366–1399)	Joan de Beauchamp, Baroness Bergavenny (c.1375–1435)	William de Beauchamp, 1st Baron Bergavenny (c. 1343–1411)	Margaret FitzAlan (b. after 1375)	Rowland Lenthall	John Fitzalan, 2nd Baron Arundel (1364–1390)
John Fitzalan, 3rd Baron Arundel, 6th Earl of Arundel (1385–1421)
John Fitzalan, 7th Earl of Arundel (1408–1435)
Humfrey; 8th earl of Arundel (1429-1438)

== Sources ==
- Aberth, John (2000). From the Brink of the Apocalypse: Confronting Famine, War, Plague, and Death in the Later Middle Ages. New York, London: Routledge. p. 237. ISBN 978-0-415-92715-4.
- Cokayne, G. E. (1910). Vicary Gibbs (ed.). The Complete Peerage. Vol. 1 (2nd ed.). London: The St. Catherine Press.
- Collins, Hugh E. L. (2000). The Order of the Garter, 1348–1461: Chivalry and Politics in Late Medieval England. Oxford: Clarendon. ISBN 978-0-19-820817-4.
- Curry, A. (2003). The Hundred Years War. Basingstoke: Macmillan. ISBN 978-0-333-53176-1.
- Curry, A. (23 September 2004). "Fitzalan, John (VI), seventh earl of Arundel (1408–1435)". Oxford Dictionary of National Biography (online ed.). Oxford University Press. doi:10.1093/ref:odnb/9532. (Subscription, Wikipedia Library access or UK public library membership required.)
- Fryde, E. B. (1961). Handbook of British Chronology (2nd ed.). London: Royal Historical Society. p. 415.
- Pollard, A. J. (1983). John Talbot and the War in France 1427–1453. London: Royal Historical Society. ISBN 978-0-901050-88-5.

=== Secondary ===
- Barker, J. (2012). Conquest: The English Kingdom of France 1417–1450 (PDF). Harvard University Press. Archived (PDF) from the original on 12 June 2018.
- C. de Beaurepaire, Les Etats d e Normandie sous la Domination Anglaise 1422-1435, Évreux 1859
- Chisholm, Hugh, ed. (1911). "Arundel, Earldom of" . Encyclopædia Britannica. Vol. 2 (11th ed.). Cambridge University Press. pp. 705–706.
- L. Douet-D'Arcq, (ed.), La Chronique d'Enguerran de Montsrelet, Paris, 1859–62, vols 3–6
- A. J. R. Pollard, John Talbot and the War in France, 1427–1453, London and New Jersey, 1983
- Thomas Rymer, ed., Foedera, Conventiones, Litterae, London, 1726–35, 10 vols.
- Tierney, Very Rev Canon (1860). "Discovery of the Remains of John, 7th Earl of Arundel". Sussex Archaeological Collections. 12: 232–9. doi:10.5284/1085230.
- J. H. Wylie, The History of England under Henry the Fifth (1896)

Peerage of England
Preceded by John Fitzalan	Earl of Arundel; 1433–1435	Succeeded by Humphrey Fitzalan
