= William Arundel =

English knight (c.1369–1400)

Sir William Arundel (born about 1369, died 1400) was a Knight of the Order of the Garter, Constable of Rochester Castle and Constable and Warden of Reigate Castle. He owed all his appointments to Richard II whose reign (1377-1399) covered most of Arundel's life.

The arms of Sir William Arundel KG as displayed in his Garter stall plate at St George's Chapel, Windsor

== Family background ==
Arundel was the son of John FitzAlan, 1st Baron Arundel and the grandson of Richard FitzAlan, 10th Earl of Arundel.

His mother was Eleanor Maltravers, daughter and heiress of Sir John Maltravers and the granddaughter (and, eventually, sole heiress) of John Maltravers, 1st Baron Maltravers.

Sir William Arundel's family used the surname Arundel rather than FitzAlan but in most cases his relations have been re-designated as FitzAlans by subsequent writers and historians. That was not done in his case, and he is always referred to as Sir William Arundel.

== Life and career ==
The precise date of Arundel's birth is not known, but it was after 1365. and has been estimated as 1369. He is first referred to in 1375 when he is one of those receiving a legacy in the will of his grandfather Richard FitzAlan, 10th Earl of Arundel. In 1389 he was granted a licence to travel (with Sir Simon Felbrigge and Robert Teye). According to Froissart, he attended Richard II to Ireland in 1394

In 1395 he was appointed as the Constable (or custos) of Rochester Castle.

Arundel was with Richard II in Ireland in 1394. In 1395 he was Constable of Rochester Castle.

He was appointed Constable and Warden of Reigate Castle, and given responsibility as Ranger for all the surrounding parks and chases, in 1397.

He and his wife Agnes both received robes of the Order of the Garter in 1399, which shows that they were expected to attend the Garter ceremonies together in that year.

== Knight of the Garter ==
He was created a Knight of the Garter in 1395. He took the place of Sir Nicholas Sarnesfeld. There was no obvious reason for him to be granted such a high honour and personal mark of favour from the Sovereign, which came at a time when his uncle Richard FitzAlan, 11th Earl of Arundel and the King had already fallen out with each other.

The fortunes of nephew and uncle may have been related, because Arundel's appointment as Constable and Warden of Reigate Castle was formalised on 7 October 1397, which was only weeks after his uncle's attainder and execution by beheading on 21 September.

Arundel's Garter stall plate (dated to about 1421) in St George's Chapel, Windsor is recognised as one of the most beautiful examples of medieval heraldic art, notable for the continuation of the feathers of the gryphon's head in his crest to form the rest of the mantling over his shield of arms. The arms displayed on the stall plate are FitzAlan quartering Maltravers (i.e. 1st and 4th, Gules, a lion rampant Or for Fitzalan: and 2nd and 3rd Sable, a fret Or for Maltravers). The crest is a gryphon's head argent beaked and langued gules arising out of a ducal coronet gules. The stall plate is in the second stall on the Sovereign's side of the Chapel

== Marriage and death ==
Sir William married a lady called Agnes, of whose family nothing else is known.

Sir William Arundel died in 1400. His will, dated London 1 August 1400 (in which month he died), specified that his body should be "buried in the Priory at Rochester, at the back of the high altar" and his tomb is still visible there, in what is now Rochester Cathedral.

There is no record of him having any children.

Sir William's widow, Lady (Agnes) Arundel, died shortly after him, in 1401. Her will, made shortly before her death, asked that her body be buried "under the tomb where my husband and me are pictured" in Rochester Cathedral. When the Cathedral was being restored shortly before 1880, their stone slab with brass memorial over depicting husband and wife was disturbed and examined during the restoration of the choir. Removal of the slab uncovered a large lead coffin and the body of a woman wrapped in lead. The brasses had at that point been torn from the slab, but the impression in the stone formed to receive the brass showed the figure of a knight in armour (Sir William) holding the hand of a lady by his side (Lady Arundel)

== Surviving monuments ==
There is still, behind the high altar of Rochester Cathedral, a stone memorial slab formerly housing a now-lost memorial brass over the remains of Sir William and his wife, Lady Agnes Arundel. A laser scan recording and imaging of the stone tomb was commissioned in 2012 and the results were published in 2014

His Garter stall plate also survives in its place in the second stall on the Sovereign's side of St George's Chapel, Windsor.
