= Thomas FitzAlan =

English knight

Sir Thomas FitzAlan (died 1430) of Betchworth Castle in Surrey was a medieval English knight.

He was the 3rd son of John FitzAlan, 2nd Baron Arundel and Elizabeth le Despenser of Betchworth. Thomas was the younger brother of John Fitzalan, 3rd Baron Arundel who was eventually made 6th Earl of Arundel. Thomas also had a younger brother, Edward Fitzalan, and was a grandson of John FitzAlan (D'Arundel) and Eleanor Maltravers. Thomas was Lord of Betchworth Castle, also known as Beechworth.

Sir Thomas married Joan Moyns, and they were parents of Eleanor FitzAlan. She was married to Sir Thomas Browne. They had four sons and a daughter.

They are ancestors of many famous English families. As well as the poet, Percy Bysshe Shelley. Another descendant is the American Abolitionist, John Brown.

Thomas FitzAlan sold Betchworth Castle to his son-in-law, Sir Thomas Browne, and upon FitzAlan's death, the castle passed from the FitzAlans to the Brownes, who occupied it until 1690.
