= Thomas FitzAlan (disambiguation) =

Thomas FitzAlan (died 1430), was an English knight.

Thomas FitzAlan may also refer to:

- Thomas FitzAlan, 12th Earl of Arundel (1381 – 1415), English nobleman, one of the principals of the deposition of Richard II, and a major figure during the reign of Henry IV
- Thomas FitzAlan, 17th Earl of Arundel (1450–1524)
