= Battle of Gerberoy =

Battle of the Hundred Years' War

- Part of the Hundred Years' War
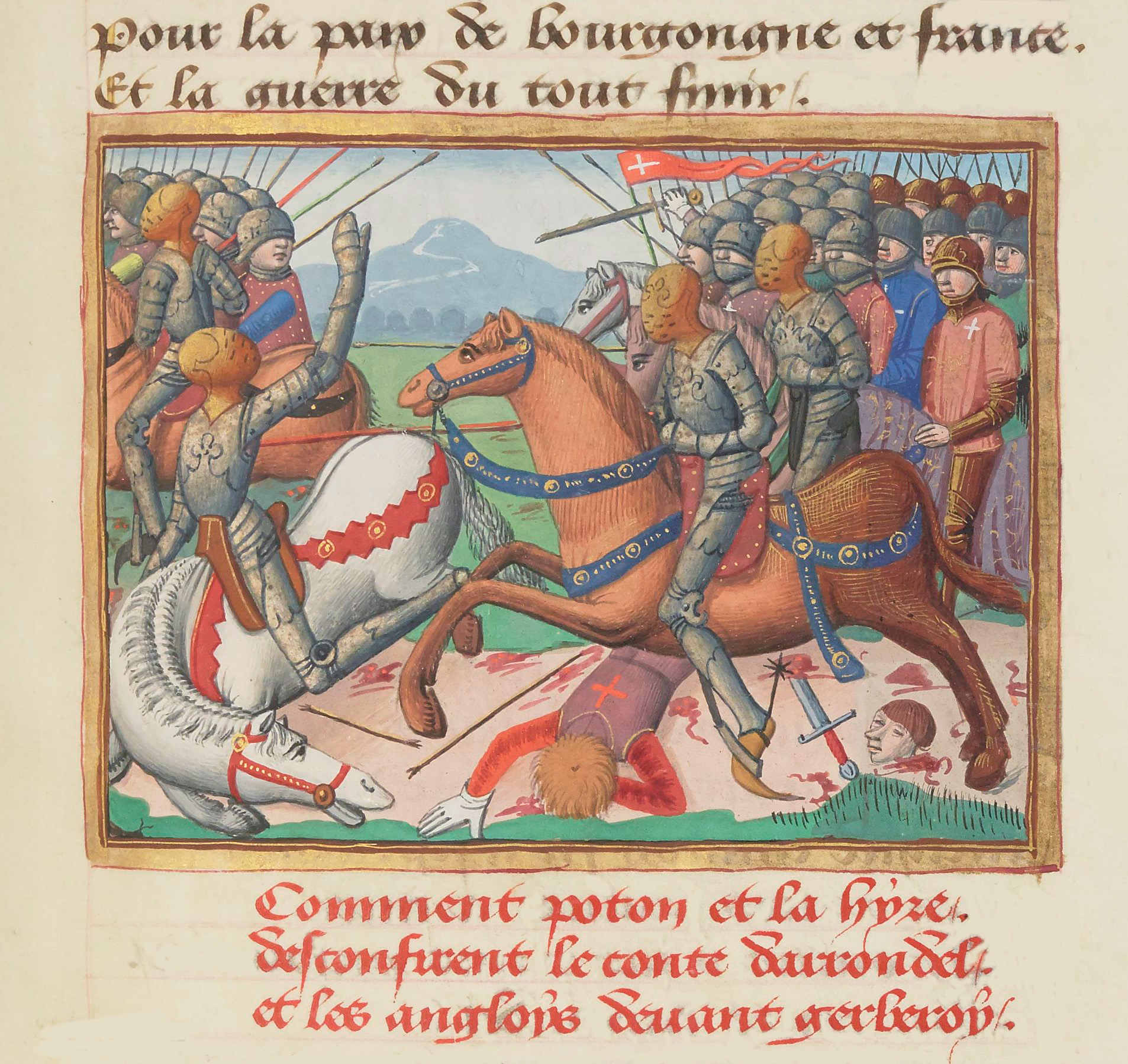
- The battle depicted in Vigiles de Charles VII, c. 1484
Date	9 May 1435
Location	Gerberoy, Hauts-de-France, France 49.535°N 1.8506°E
Result	French victory

Belligerents
Kingdom of France	Kingdom of England

Commanders and leaders
La Hire; Jean de Xaintrailles	John FitzAlan (DOW)

Strength
600–1,800	3,000

Casualties and losses
20–30	1,000

The Battle of Gerberoy was fought in 1435 between French and English forces. The French were led by La Hire and Jean Poton de Xaintrailles, who were victorious. The English losses were heavy, which later included their commander, John FitzAlan, 14th Earl of Arundel.

== Background ==
In spring 1435 the Hundred Years' War, after a few years of relative calm began to come back into a hot phase. The English armies were operating from northern France and Aquitaine. They also controlled Paris, Saint-Denis and the whole of Normandy. Nevertheless, the situation in the occupied territories for the English during the last decades had become more difficult. Although Joan of Arc was captured in 1430 and executed in 1431, it seemed to be more difficult to rule France and enforce the Treaty of Troyes.

During the year 1434 the French king Charles VII increased control over the territories north of Paris, including Soissons, Compiègne, Senlis and Beauvais. Due to its position Gerberoy appeared as a good outpost to threaten the English occupied Normandy and even stronger to protect the nearby Beauvais of a possible reconquest. The French hoped to expand into the city already in 1432, but due to the low state revenues they could not raise sufficient troops and gave up the project at first. In spring 1435, the project was taken up again and corresponding expenditure in the defense budget was prepared. According to the writings of the canon Jean Pillet (the first historian of Gerberoy), there was a troop of 600–1800 men positioned for this, and under the command of Jean Poton de Xaintrailles and La Hire, both former commanders with Joan of Arc. They arrived secretly at Gerberoy and set to work to restore the old defenses.

At this time, in Gournay-sur-Epte, Normandy (now Gournay-en-Bray in Seine-Maritime), about a dozen kilometers southwest of Gerberoy, sat an English army under the command of John FitzAlan, 14th Earl of Arundel, in motion. This should bring the city Rue, which had also been recently recaptured by the French, again under English control. The troops led material for a siege with them. Arundel reached with his troops in early May 1435 at Gournay and marched without special backup on Gerberoy, he believed only weakly defended. His troops (according to Jean Pillet about 3,000 men, but this figure is probably only a rough estimate) were certainly numerically far superior to the French troops.

== Battle ==
The Earl of Arundel appeared on 9 May before Gerberoy along with a vanguard that probably consisted of a few knights and withdrew after a brief observation of the valley, waiting for the arrival of the main English force.

The French, who had followed all the action from an elevated position from Gerberoy, quickly realized that it was merely an advance party and the main force of the English army was still on the road to Gournay. Since they had not yet sufficiently recovered their strength and repaired the fortifications for the impending siege, the French decided to take the initiative and to attack the Englishmen when they were completely unprepared.

A column of French cavalry under La Hire left the town, and bypassed the position of the English vanguard to launch a surprise attack on the English, as they were marching along the road to Gournay. The French cavalry arrived undetected in a place called Les Epinettes, near Laudecourt, a hamlet near Gournay, and then attacked the English main force. At the same time the rest of the garrison (the foot soldiers and archers) was under the command of Xaintrailles. This, in isolation from the rest of the troops took shelter behind a pile dwelling nearby.

After it was La Hire and his horsemen attacked the English on the streets of Gournai, and heavy fighting between the two sides ensued with many English soldiers and French cavalry being killed. During the battle, the Earl of Arundel was badly wounded when a shot from a culvern, a medieval firearm, struck the earl in his foot. When the French reinforcements appeared, the remaining English soldiers realised their situation was now hopeless and retreated to Gerberoy. During the retreat, the French cavalry continued to attack the remnants of the English Army, and despite inflicting losses on the English force, failed to break up the army's formation and were eventually driven off after suffering a number of casualties.

During the retreat, the French were able to kill a large number of English soldiers; the badly wounded Earl of Arundel was captured, initially refusing to allow his shattered foot to be amputated, the insuring infection led to his death. The losses of the English army were high and perhaps went into the hundreds, while the French army are said to have lost around twenty soldiers, although it could well have been more than thirty.

== Results ==
Despite the victory, the French were unable to exploit their success and strengthen their position in Gerberoy area. The city was besieged again by the English in the wake of the French victory and was captured by the English in 1437. The French succeeded in recapturing the city in 1449. In 1451 when all of Normandy was back under French control, the city of Gerberoy lost its role as a strategic frontier post.

The victory of 9 May 1435 does not appear, in spite of its remarkable results, as one of the decisive French victories of the Hundred Years' War. But it illustrates well how developed the French the military situation was after the victories of Joan of Arc, and her subsequent death.
