= John Fitzalan, 10th Baron Arundel =

15th/16thC English nobleman

John Fitzalan
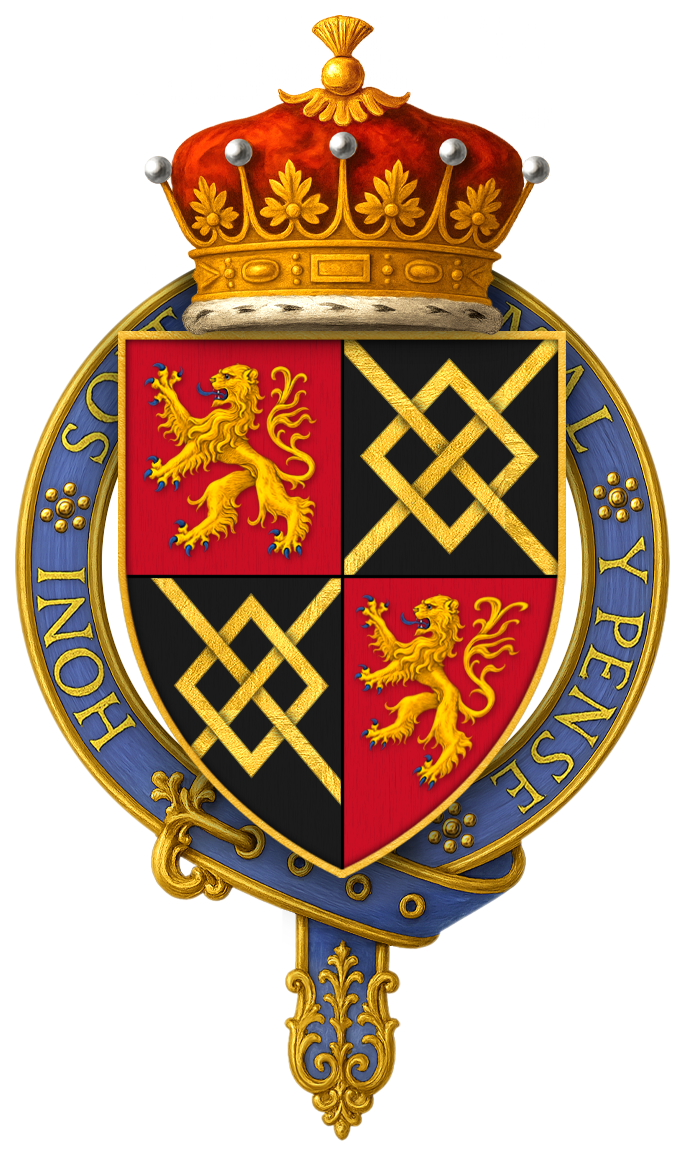
- Born: 1455; Lytchett Matravers, Dorset
- Died: 1533 (aged 77–78)
- Parent(s): William Fitzalan, 9th Earl of Arundel; Joan Neville
- Relatives: Thomas, 10th Earl of Arundel (brother); John, 7th Earl of Arundel (uncle); Humphrey, 8th Earl (cousin)

John Fitzalan of Arundel was an English nobleman. He was called John Arundel (the family had ceased using the surname Fitzalan a century before his birth).

Born in 1455, John was the fourth son of William Fitzalan, 9th Earl of Arundel. and Joan Neville.

In 1486, John Arundel was present with Edward Woodville in Henry Tudor 's entourage as he planned to become King, during his exile in Brittany.

At the Battle of Stoke Field in 1487, John Arundel was knighted on the field after the battle.

In 1488, against the advice of King Henry Tudor, Sir John Arundel mounted an expedition with Sir Edward Woodville on the Isle of Wight to help the Bretons against the French. They wanted to sail to Saint-Malo in Brittany. Edward Woodville managed to embark for Saint-Malo, but John Arundel was intercepted by royal agents while still on Wight and arrested with his ship and all men of his company for ignoring the King's order not to fight.

Edward had marched his men down from Saint-Malo to join the Breton and allied forces giving battle in July at Saint-Aubin-du-Cormier against much a larger French force and was killed. John of Arundel, later freed when King Henry Tudor changed his mind, reached Saint-Malo, but arrived after the battle.

== Notes ==
Defeated, the high-ranking Breton commander, Jean de Rieux, Marshal of Brittany, withdrew his troops a few kilometers north of Saint-Aubin-du-Cormier and east of the town of Dol. John of Arundel joined them. Jean de Rieux was Lord of Grand-Fougeray.

According to most genealogists, around 1500, John Arundel changed his name to Jean Arondel as a survival strategy and married a Breton woman from a wealthy family (notable landowners in Grand-Fougeray) to blend in with the local nobility. The Arondels' English ancestry was apparently concealed by the family for more than three centuries, as it was considered suspect and dangerous, and then claimed by the same family starting in the 19th century, as it had become highly valued.

== Bibliography ==
- Cokayne, George Edward (1910). The Complete Peerage, edited by H.A. Doubleday. Vol. I. London: St. Catherine Press.
- Cokayne, George Edward (1916). The Complete Peerage, edited by the Honourable Vicary Gibbs. Vol. IV. London: St. Catherine Press.
- Richardson, Douglas (2011). Everingham, Kimball G. (ed.). Magna Carta Ancestry: A Study in Colonial and Medieval Families. Vol. I (2nd ed.). Salt Lake City. ISBN 978-1449966379.
- Richardson, Douglas (2011). Everingham, Kimball G. (ed.). Magna Carta Ancestry: A Study in Colonial and Medieval Families. Vol. III (2nd ed.). Salt Lake City. ISBN 978-1449966393.
