= John FitzAlan, 1st Baron Arundel =

English soldier

John Fitzalan, 1st Baron Arundel (c. 1348 – 1379), also known as Sir John Arundel, was an English soldier.

== Lineage ==
He was born in Etchingham, Sussex, England to Richard Fitzalan, 3rd Earl of Arundel (c. 1313 – 1376), and his second wife Eleanor of Lancaster (1318–1372), daughter of Henry, 3rd Earl of Lancaster, and widow of John Beaumont, 2nd Baron Beaumont. His brother was Thomas Arundel, Archbishop of Canterbury. His sister was Joan Fitzalan, Countess of Hereford.

== High office ==
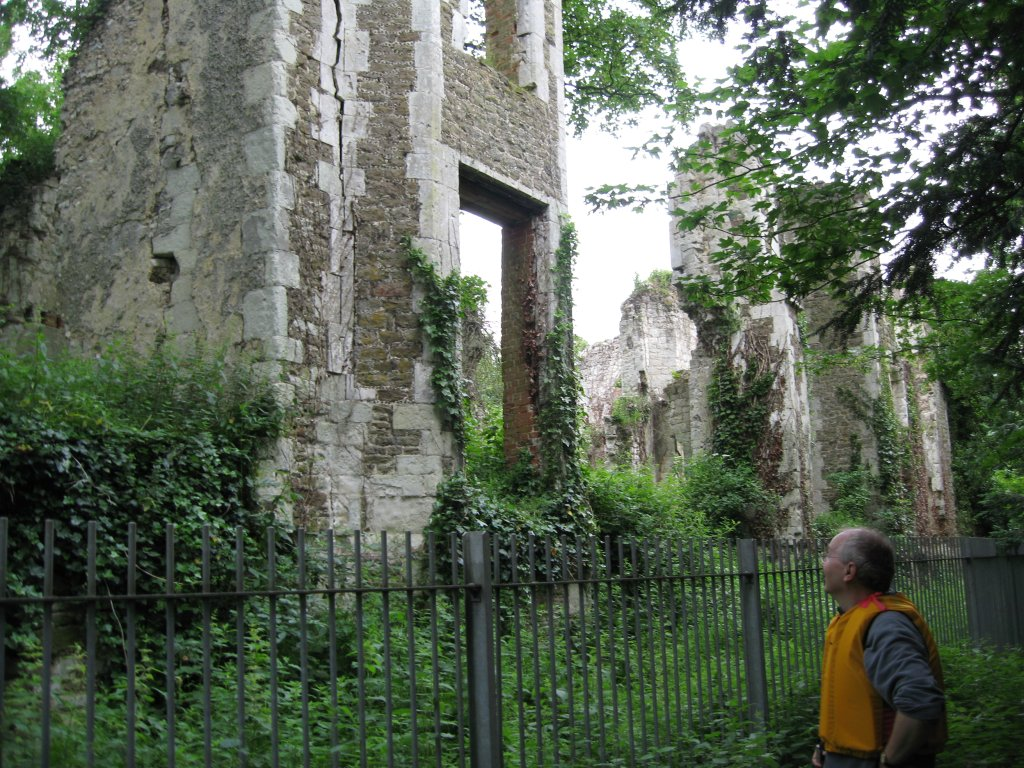
Betchworth Castle

John was appointed Lord Marshal of England by Richard II in 1377, and summoned to the House of Lords on 4 August 1377, by writ directed Johanni de Arundell. He served as Lord Marshal until 1379.

On 26 July 1379 he was given licence to crenellate (i.e., permission to fortify) a stone castle on the site of an 11th-century earthwork fortress in Surrey. Over the years since then the structure was rebuilt and remodelled and its remains are now known as Betchworth Castle.

== Naval victory ==
Being in command of a naval expedition in aid to the Duke of Brittany, he defeated the French fleet off the coast of Cornwall.

== Death at sea ==
Commanding a force with the purpose of bringing relief to the Duke of Brittany, Sir John was compelled to wait for stronger winds. During this wait he decided to take refuge in a nunnery, where his men "took no notice of the sanctity of the place and... violently assaulted and raped" those they found inside. Further to this Sir John "allowed his men to ransack the countryside as they liked and to impoverish the people". When the force eventually set out to sea, carrying with them goods stolen from a nearby church and under a pronouncement of excommunication from the wronged priests, the expedition was caught in a storm. Thomas Walsingham reports that during the panic of the storm, Sir John murdered those of his men who refused to make for shore for fear of being shipwrecked upon the rocks. Subsequently, after safely arriving on an island off the Irish coast, Sir John and his boat captain were swept back into the sea and drowned.

According to Thomas Walsingham's story, FitzAlan's men profaned a convent at or near Southampton, and abducted many of its occupants. The fleet was then pursued by a violent tempest, when the wretched nuns who had been carried off were thrown overboard to lighten the ships. The vessels were, however, wrecked on the Irish coast, near Scarriff according to some authorities, but at Cape Clear Island according to others. Sir John Arundell, together with his esquires, and other men of high birth, were drowned, and twenty-five ships were lost with most of their crews. Froissart's account of the event differs essentially from Walsingham's, in the omission of the story of the desecration of the convent.

== Burial ==
He was buried in Lewes, Sussex.

== Marriage and children ==
On 17 February 1358, FitzAlan married Eleanor Maltravers (Mautravers) (1345 – 10 January 1404 or 1406), daughter of John Maltravers, 1st Baron Maltravers and Gwenthin. They had at least five children (some references list more):

- Joan FitzAlan (D' Arundel) (c. 1360 – 1 September 1404. She married first William de Brien (one son) and secondly Sir William de Echingham.
- John FitzAlan, 2nd Baron Arundel (3 November 1364 – 14 August 1390), who married Elizabeth le Despenser.
- Richard FitzAlan (c. 1366 – 3 June 1419). His daughter Joan married Thomas Willoughby of Parham, a grandson of Alayne FitzAlan, daughter of Edmund Fitzalan, 2nd Earl of Arundel.
- Sir William Arundel (c. 1369 – 1400). He was a Knight of the Garter.
- Margaret (1372 – 7 July 1439) married William Ros, 6th Baron Ros of Hamlake and had descendants

== Ancestry ==
Ancestors of John FitzAlan, 1st Baron Arundel

Richard Fitzalan, 8th Earl of Arundel
Edmund Fitzalan, 9th Earl of Arundel
Alice of Saluzzo
Richard Fitzalan, 10th Earl of Arundel
William de Warenne
Alice de Warenne
Joan de Vere
John FitzAlan, 1st Baron Arundel
Edmund Crouchback, 1st Earl of Lancaster
Henry, 3rd Earl of Lancaster
Blanche of Artois
Eleanor of Lancaster
Sir Patrick de Chaworth, Lord of Kidwelly
Maud Chaworth
Isabella de Beauchamp

== Notes ==
Political offices
Preceded by The Countess of Norfolk	Lord Marshal; 1377–1383	Succeeded by The Earl of Nottingham
Peerage of England
New creation	Baron Arundel; 1377–1379	Succeeded by John Arundel (de jure); John Fitzalan VI (de facto)
