= Baron Arundel =

Baron Arundel was a title in the Peerage of England created on 4 August 1377 by the summons of John Fitzalan to Parliament as "Johanni de Arundell". As he was then married to Eleanor Maltravers, coheir and eventual sole heir of John Maltravers, 1st Baron Maltravers, this is sometimes taken to be identical with the Barony of Maltravers. The barony subsequently came to be held by the Earl of Arundel, now itself a subsidiary title of the Duke of Norfolk.

== Barons Arundel (1377) ==
- John Fitzalan, 1st Baron Arundel (c. 1348 – 1379)
- John Fitzalan, 2nd Baron Arundel (1364–1390)
- John Fitzalan, 3rd Baron and 13th Earl of Arundel (1385–1421)

For further Barons: Earl of Arundel
