= William Fitzalan, 9th Earl of Arundel =

English nobleman

William Fitzalan Earl of Arundel
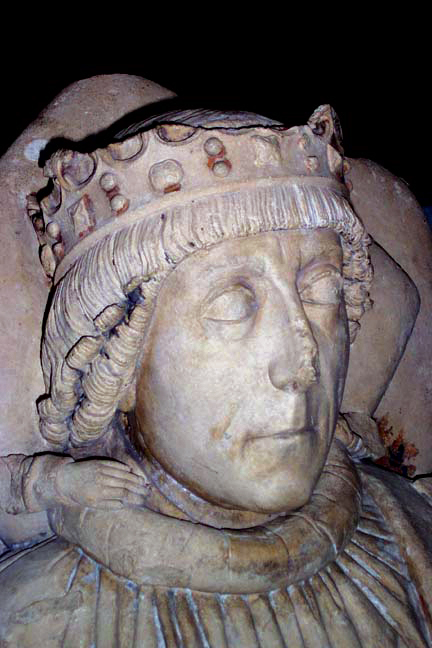
- Born: 23 November 1417
- Died: 1487 (aged 69–70)
- Spouse: Joan Neville
- Children: 5, including Thomas, 10th Earl of Arundel
- Parent(s): John, 6th Earl of Arundel; Eleanor Berkeley
- Relatives: John, 7th Earl of Arundel (brother); Humphrey, 8th Earl (nephew)

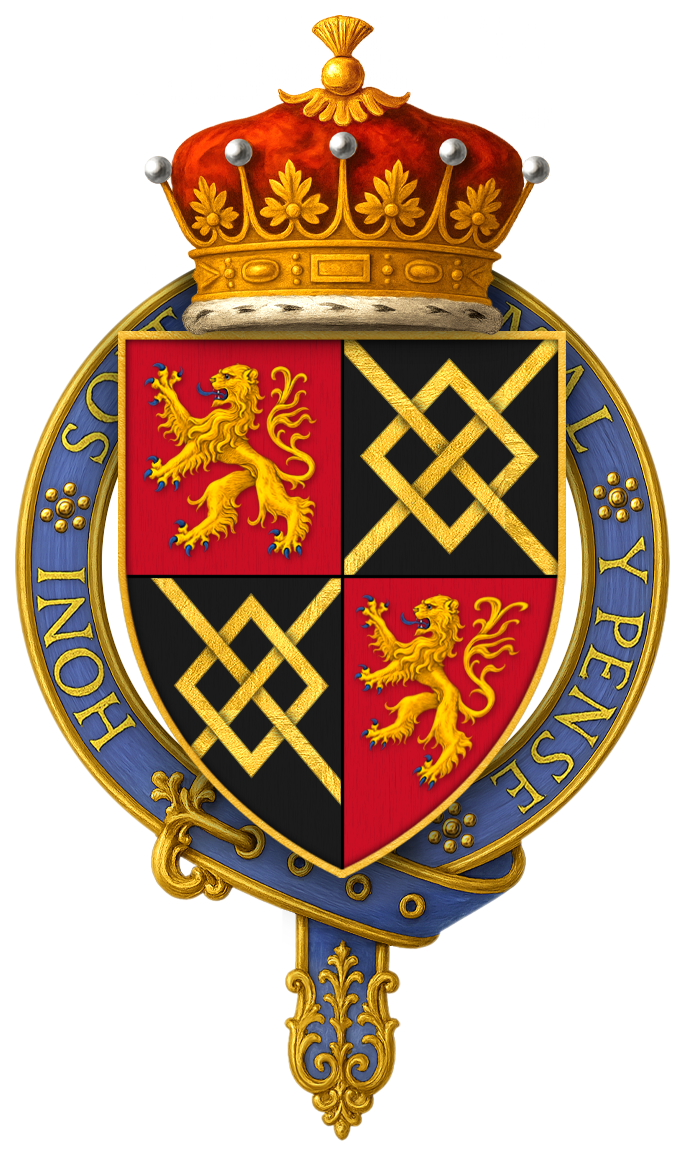
Arms of Sir William Fitzalan, 9th Earl of Arundel, KG

William Fitzalan, 9th Earl of Arundel, 6th Baron Maltravers (23 November 1417 – 1487) was an English nobleman.

Born on 23 November 1417, William was the second son of John Fitzalan, 6th Earl of Arundel (1385–1421), and Eleanor Berkeley (d. 1455), daughter of John Berkeley of Beverston.

His elder brother John Fitzalan, 7th Earl of Arundel, died on 12 June 1435. The title passed to William's nephew Humphrey Fitzalan, 8th Earl of Arundel, who was only a six-year-old with no descendants. William thus became the heir presumptive and, when Humphrey died three years later on 24 April 1438, he succeeded to the title.

== Marriage and issue ==
He married Joan Neville, eldest daughter of Richard Neville, 5th Earl of Salisbury, and Alice Montagu, suo jure Countess of Salisbury. Alice was a daughter of Thomas Montacute, 4th Earl of Salisbury, and Eleanor Holland. Eleanor was a daughter of Thomas Holland, 2nd Earl of Kent, and Alice FitzAlan. Alice was a daughter of Richard FitzAlan, 4th Earl of Arundel, and Eleanor of Lancaster.

William and Joan had five children:

- Thomas Fitzalan, 10th Earl of Arundel (1450–1524).
- William Fitzalan, who had issue.
- George Fitzalan.
- John Fitzalan.
- Mary Fitzalan.

William was summoned to the Great Council of February 1458, (and indeed, he was instructed to stop foot-dragging and attend). He was one of the few nobles to fight first for the House of Lancaster, and then change to supporting the House of York. He fought at the Battle of Ludford Bridge in 1459 for Lancaster, and later fought in the Second Battle of St Albans (17 February 1461) as a supporter of the house of York. The Yorkists were commanded by his brother-in-law Richard Neville, 16th Earl of Warwick.

Edward IV of England named him a Knight of the Garter in 1471, probably in honour of his support during the Wars of the Roses. He was Warden of the Cinque Ports in 1471 and from 1483 to 1487.

| Preceded by John Scott: Vacant after 1471 | Lord Warden of the Cinque Ports; 1483-1488 | Succeeded by Philip Fitz Lewes |

== Notes ==
Legal offices
| Preceded by vacant? | Justice in eyre south of the Trent; 1459–1461 | Succeeded by The Duke of Norfolk |
| Preceded by The Earl of Essex | Justice in eyre south of the Trent; 1483–1485 | Succeeded by Lord Fitzwalter; Sir Reynold Bray |
Peerage of England
| Preceded by Humphrey Fitzalan | Earl of Arundel; 1438–1487 | Succeeded by Thomas Fitzalan |
| Preceded by Humphrey Fitzalan | Baron Maltravers (descended by acceleration); 1438–1482 | Succeeded by Thomas Fitzalan |
