= Beauvaisis =

The Beauvaisis (/bo.vɛ.zi/, in picard : Bieuvésis or Bieuvaisis,), sometimes written in its old spelling Beauvoisis, is a traditional country of Picardy, south to the Amiénois and north to the French Vexin. Beauvais is the traditional seat of the Beauvaisis region, the main towns encompass Clermont, Breteuil, Gerberoy, Chambly, Liancourt and Ressons-sur-Matz.

Map of Beauvaisis.

Coat of arms of the Bishops of Beauvais

== Geography ==
At the contrary of other traditional countries of Picardy, which were formed due to natural disposition, such as the Santerre, Albert Demangeon shows evidence that the Beauvaisis was originally formed by the concatenation of multiple smaller ancient countries.

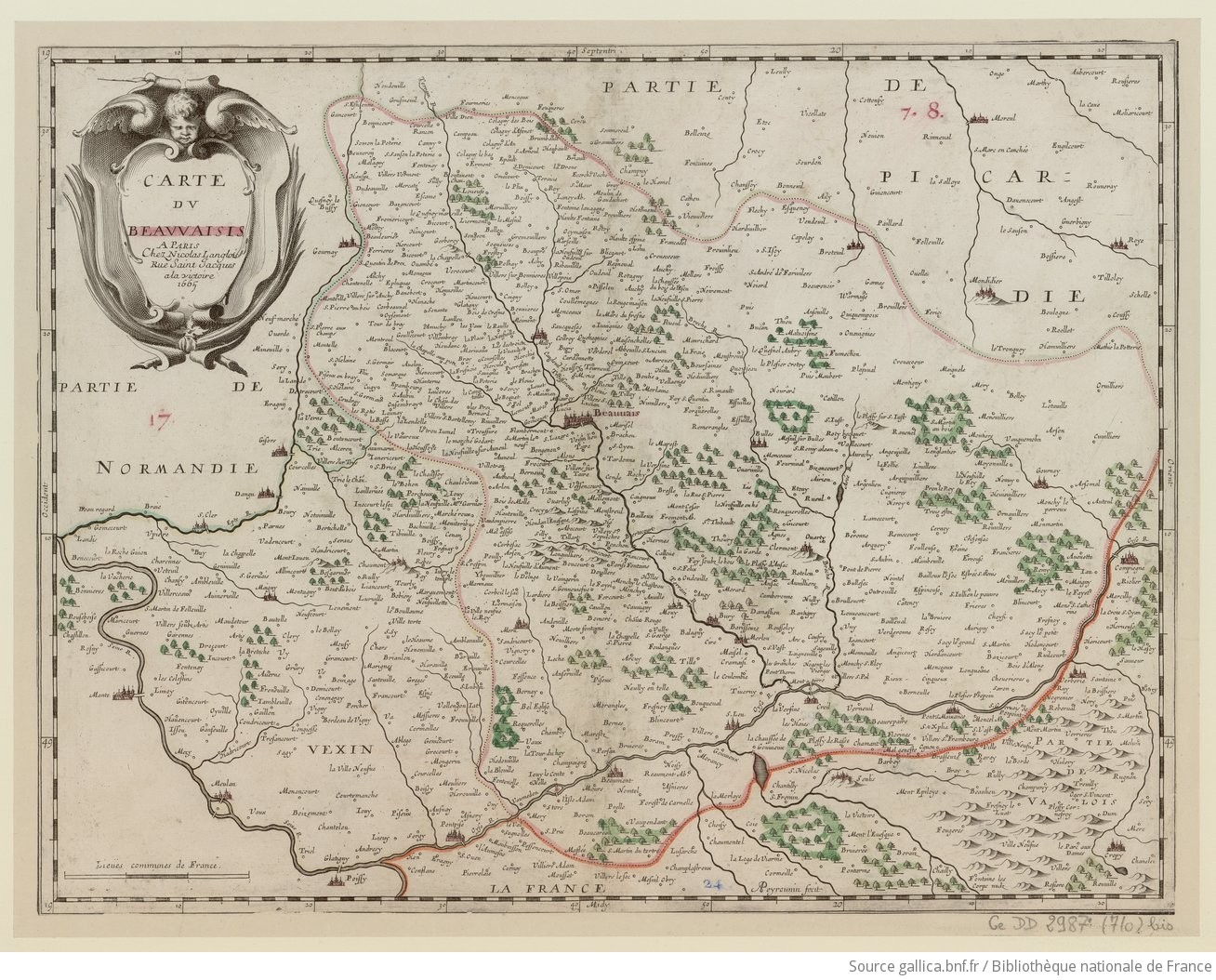
Ancient map of the Beauvaisis by Abraham Peyrounin, 1665.

There used to be a proper Beauvaisis, in the surrounding areas of Beauvais and Clermont, then there is the Picard Bray, near Gerberoy, the Vendelois or Vendeuillais, surrounding Breteuil, the Chambliois, near Chambly, also named the country of Thelle, and finally the Ressontois, near Ressons-sur-Matz.

The term of Clermontois also appeared in modern times, encompassing the surroundings of Clermont.

== History ==
During ancient times, the current territory of the Beauvaisis was occupied by a belgic celtic tribe named the Bellovaci, who later gave its name to the Bellovacensis pagus, and to the Bellovaci city, Beauvais. This pagus extended over Beauvais, the Picard Bray, Clermont, Coudun, Aulchy-la-Montagne, Mouchy-le-Châtel, Pont-Sainte-Maxence and Ressons-sur-Matz.

The city of the Bellovaci (Belvacensis civitas) was divided into four pagi : Belvacensis (Beauvais), Camliacensis (Chambliois), Rossontensis (Ressons-sur-Matz) and Vindoilensis (Breteuil). These four pagi formed the countries encompassed in Beauvaisis, in its greatest extent. It is to be underlined that many ancient or current toponyms highlight this belonging to the Beauvaisis region: Marseille-en-Beauvaisis, Chambly (Chambli en Beauvoisis) Breteuil (Britulium territorii belvacensis castellum, Bretheuil en Beauvoisis), Venette (Venete en Beauvoisis) or Maignelay-Montigny (Montigny en Beauvoisis).
