= John FitzAlan, 2nd Baron Arundel =

John FitzAlan
- 2nd Baron Arundel; 2nd Baron Maltravers
- Coat of arms of John FitzAlan, 2nd Baron Arundel, 2nd Baron Maltravers: FitzAlan quartering Maltravers
- Born: 30 November 1364
- Died: 14 August 1390 (aged 25)
- Buried: Missenden Abbey
- Spouse: Elizabeth le Despenser
- Issue: John FitzAlan, 13th Earl of Arundel; Thomas FitzAlan; Edward Arundel
- Father: John FitzAlan, 1st Baron Arundel
- Mother: Eleanor Maltravers

John FitzAlan, 2nd Baron Arundel, 2nd Baron Maltravers jure matris, also called John de Arundel (30 November 1364 – 14 August 1390), of Buckland, Surrey, was the son and heir of John FitzAlan, 1st Baron Arundel by his wife Eleanor Maltravers, the grand-daughter and eventual heiress of John Maltravers, 1st Baron Maltravers.

John was with the army in Scotland in 1383 and with the English Fleet in the western coast of France.

He married Elizabeth le Despenser, daughter of Edward le Despencer, 1st Baron le Despencer (Despenser), by Elizabeth Burghersh, daughter and heiress of Bartholomew de Burghersh, 2nd Baron Burghersh. They had issue:

- John Fitzalan, 6th Earl of Arundel, 3rd Baron Maltravers (1385-1421), eldest son and heir;
- Thomas Fitzalan (d.1430) of Betchworth Castle in Surrey;
- Edward (or Edmund) Arundel.

Sir John de Arundel, 2nd Lord Arundel, died on 14 August 1390, and was buried at Missenden Abbey, Buckinghamshire.

Peerage of England
Preceded by John FitzAlan	Baron Arundel; 1379–1390	Succeeded by John FitzAlan
