= Elizabeth le Despenser =

English noblewoman

- Baroness Arundel; Baroness Zouche
- Died: 10 April/11 April 1408
- Noble family: Le Despenser (by birth); FitzAlan (by marriage); La Zouche (by marriage)
- Spouses: John FitzAlan, 2nd Baron Arundel; William la Zouche, 3rd Baron Zouche
- Issue: John de Arundel, Lord Maltravers; Thomas Fitzalan; Edward/Edmund Arundel; Margaret, Baroness de Ros
- Father: Edward le Despencer, 1st Baron le Despencer
- Mother: Elizabeth de Burghersh, 3rd Baroness Burghersh

Elizabeth Despenser (died 10 April/11 April 1408) was an English noblewoman of the late 14th century. She should not be confused with Elizabeth le Despenser, Baroness Berkeley, who was her great-aunt and who was the daughter of her great-grandmother, Eleanor de Clare. She was the daughter of Sir Edward le Despencer, 1st Baron le Despencer, by Lady Elizabeth Burghersh, daughter and heiress of Bartholomew de Burghersh, 2nd Baron Burghersh.

== First marriage ==
She married Sir John FitzAlan, 2nd Baron Arundel. They had three sons and one daughter:

- John de Arundel, Lord Maltravers, and Lord Arundel.
- Thomas FitzAlan.
- Edward/Edmund Arundel.
- Margaret (married to William de Ros, 6th Baron de Ros)

Sir John de Arundel, 2nd Baron Arundel, died on 14 August 1390, and was buried at Missenden Abbey, Buckinghamshire.

== Second marriage ==
Elizabeth married secondly, apparently after 28 April 1393 (as his second wife), William la Zouche, 3rd Baron Zouche of Haryngworth (d. 13 May 1396). They had no children. Her will requested burial at Tewkesbury Abbey, Gloucestershire.

== Ancestry ==
Ancestors of Elizabeth le Despenser

8. Hugh le Despenser the Younger
4. Edward le Despenser
9. Eleanor de Clare
2. Edward le Despencer, 1st Baron le Despencer
10. Sir William de Ferrers of Groby, Lord Ferrers
5. Anne Ferrers
11. Ellen de Segrave
1. Elizabeth le Despenser
12. Bartholomew de Burghersh, 1st Baron Burghersh
6. Bartholomew de Burghersh, 2nd Baron Burghersh
13. Elizabeth de Verdun
3. Elizabeth de Burghersh, 3rd Baroness Burghersh
14. Richard of Weyland
7. Cecily de Weyland
