= Eleanor Maltravers =

English noblewoman

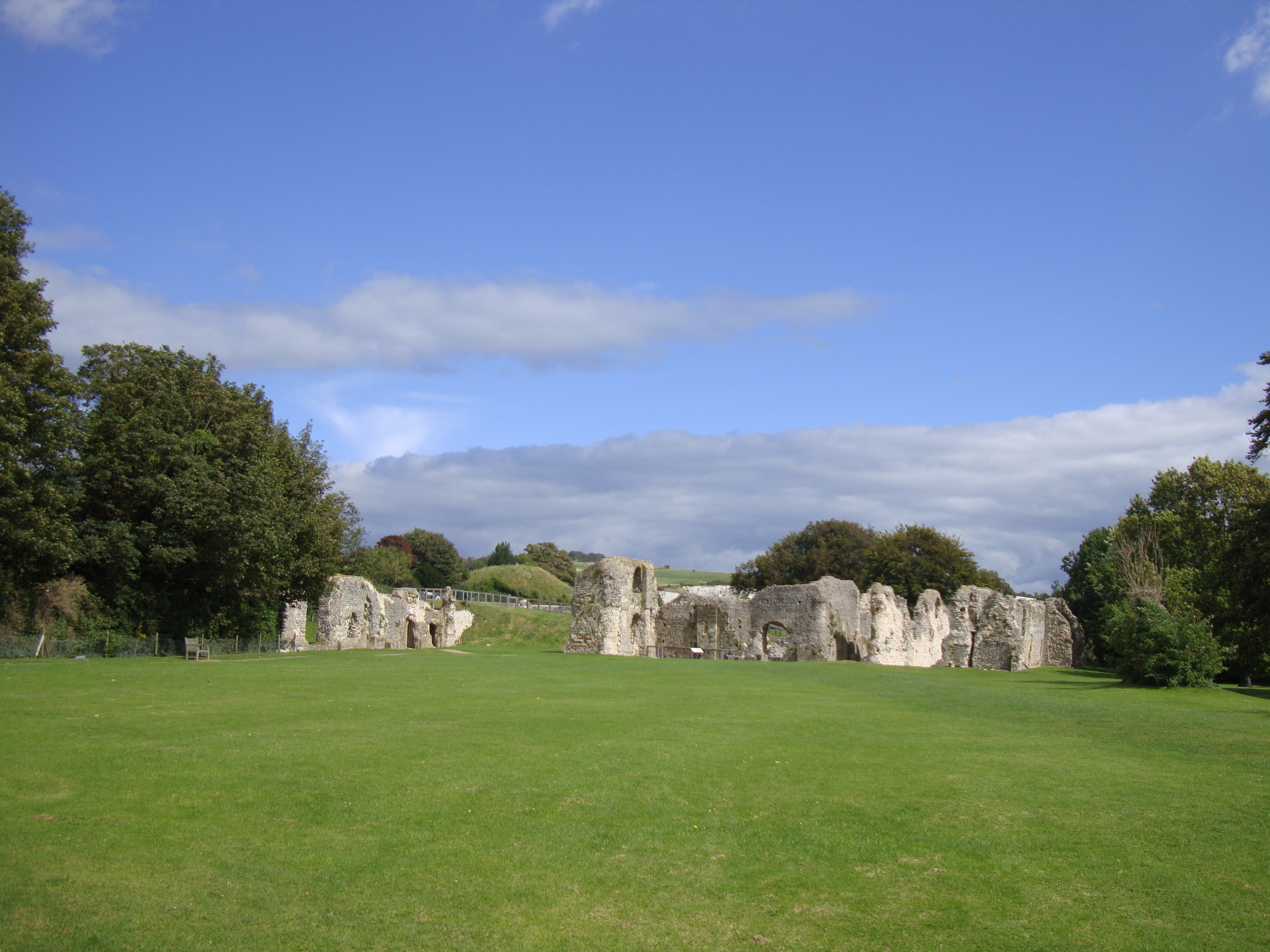
- Remains of Lewes Priory, burial place of Eleanor Maltravers
- Born: c.1345
- Died: January 1405
- Buried: Lewes Priory, Sussex
- Noble family: Maltravers
- Spouses: John FitzAlan, 1st Baron Arundel; Reginald Cobham, 2nd Baron Cobham of Sterborough
- Issue: John FitzAlan, 2nd Baron Arundel; Sir William FitzAlan; Sir Richard FitzAlan; Joan FitzAlan; Margaret FitzAlan; Reginald Cobham, 3rd Baron Cobham of Sterborough; Margaret Cobham
- Father: Sir John Maltravers
- Mother: Gwenthlian (family unknown)

Eleanor Maltravers, or Mautravers, (c. 1345 – January 1405) was an English noblewoman. The granddaughter and eventual heiress of the first Baron Maltravers, she married two barons in succession and passed her grandfather's title to her grandson.

== Origins ==
Her father was Sir John Maltravers, son of John Maltravers, 1st Baron Maltravers and his first wife Millicent. Eleanor's mother, a woman called Gwenthlian of unknown family, died in 1349, leaving Eleanor and her two siblings:

- Henry (born in 1347), who died in infancy;
- Joan (born about 1342), who married first Sir John Keynes and secondly Sir Robert Rous.

When her grandfather John died in 1364, his two heiresses were Eleanor and her sister Joan. When Joan died without leaving children, Eleanor herself became the sole inheritor of his title.

== First marriage ==
On 17 February 1359, she married Sir John FitzAlan. Their children included:

Sir John, who married Elizabeth, daughter of Edward le Despencer, 1st Baron le Despencer, with whom he had three sons.
Sir William, KG, who married a wife named Agnes but had no children.
Sir Richard, who married Alice, the widow of Roger Burley, and had one son and three daughters.
Joan, who married first Sir William Bryan and secondly Sir William Etchingham.
Margaret, who married William de Ros, 6th Baron de Ros.

Her husband was summoned to Parliament on 4 August 1377, for which he is regarded as 1st Baron Arundel, and died in a shipwreck on 15 December 1379, his body being washed ashore in Ireland and buried there.

== Second marriage ==
On 9 August 1380 she married as his second wife Reginald Cobham, 2nd Baron Cobham, of Sterborough. Their children included:

Reginald, later 3rd Baron Cobham of Sterborough, who married Eleanor Culpeper and was the father of Eleanor, first the mistress and then the second wife of Humphrey, Duke of Gloucester.
Margaret, who married Sir Reginald Curtis, of Westcliffe, and had children.

After the birth of their son and heir Reginald in 1381, it was realised that as they were second cousins, both being great-grandchildren of Maurice Berkeley, 2nd Baron Berkeley, their marriage was invalid and their child, being therefore illegitimate, could not inherit. After obtaining an annulment of the marriage, followed by a papal dispensation waiving their consanguinity, they married again on 29 September 1384. This did not however legalise the status of young Reginald, for when his father died in July 1403 his inheritance was seized by the king on the grounds that there was no legitimate male heir.

== Death and legacy ==
Eleanor died on 10 or 12 January 1405, and was buried at Lewes Priory, Sussex. Her will dated 26 September 1404, was proved on 16 January 1405 at Maidstone, Kent.

After her death, her grandfather's title passed to her grandson John FitzAlan, 13th Earl of Arundel, who was also called Baron Maltravers.
