= Gerberoy =

- Commune
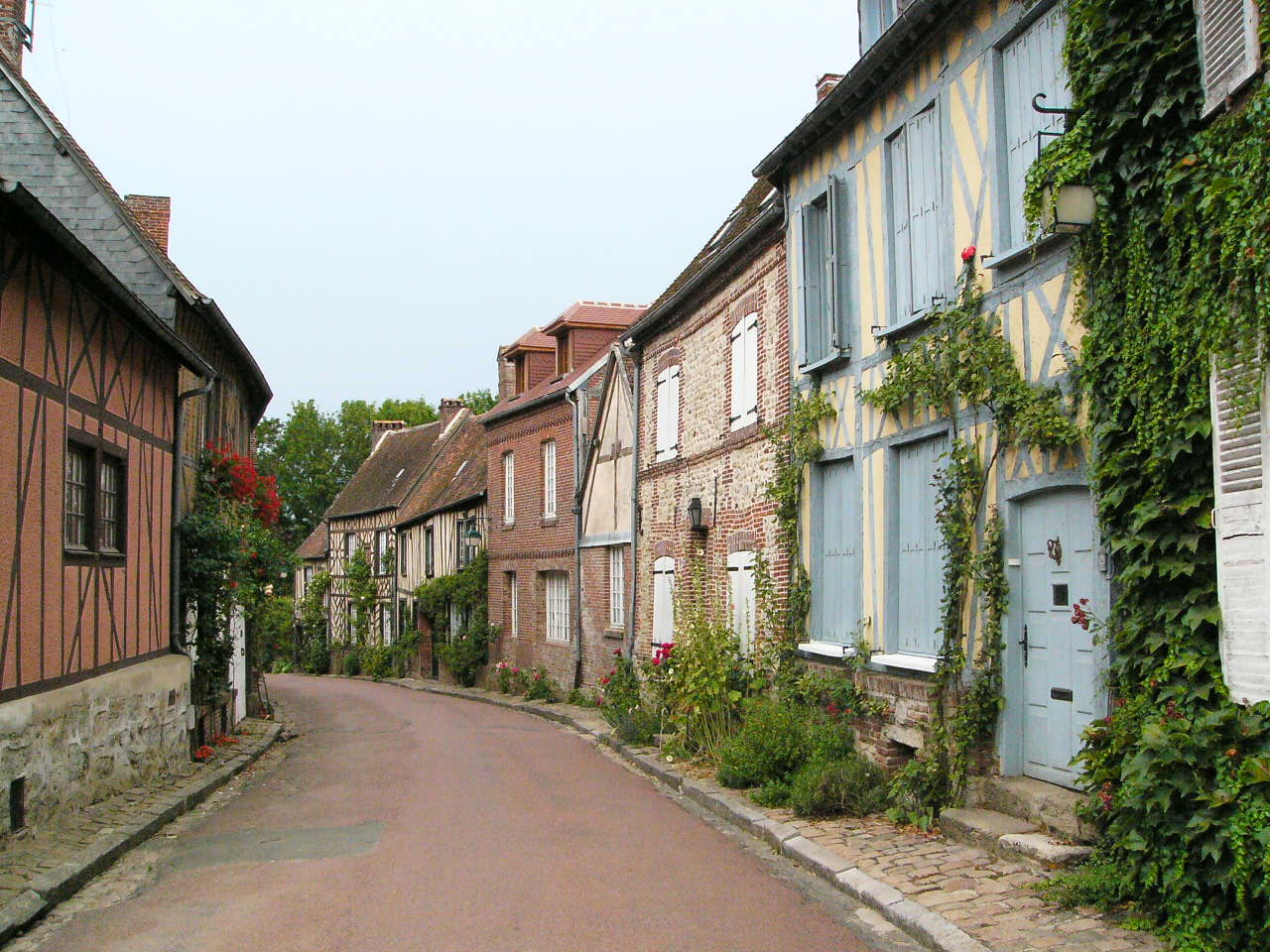
- The main street in Gerberoy

- Coat of arms
- Location of Gerberoy
- Location within France Location within Hauts-de-France
- Coordinates: 49°32′06″N 1°51′02″E
- Country: France
- Region: Hauts-de-France
- Department: Oise
- Arrondissement: Beauvais
- Canton: Grandvilliers
- Intercommunality: Picardie Verte

Government
  - Mayor (2020–2026): Pierre Chavonnet
- Area^{1}: 4.51 km^{2} (1.74 sq mi)
- Elevation: 204 m (669 ft)
- Highest elevation: 201 m (659 ft)
- Lowest elevation: 111 m (364 ft)
- Population (2023): 82
  - Density: 18/km^{2} (47/sq mi)
- Time zone: UTC+01:00 (CET)
  - Summer (DST): UTC+02:00 (CEST)
- INSEE/Postal code: 60271 /60380
- ^{1} French Land Register data, which excludes lakes, ponds, glaciers > 1 km^{2} (0.386 sq mi or 247 acres) and river estuaries.

Gerberoy (French pronunciation: [ʒɛʁbəʁwa]; Picard: Gèrbroè) is a commune in the Oise department in northern France, in the old pays of Beauvaisis.

== Toponymy ==
Gerboredum 11th Century. Germanic masculine name Gerbold and Old North French roy 'ford' (Celtic rito-, Old Welsh rit > Welsh rhyd).

A ford in the Thérain stream.

== History ==
The old village with many half-timbered houses, and traces of the medieval castle, is listed in the plus beaux villages de France (Most beautiful French villages).

The siege and battle of Gerberoy was fought between William the Conqueror and his son Robert Curthose in the winter of 1078–79.

== See also ==
- Communes of the Oise department
