= John Maltravers, 1st Baron Maltravers =

English nobleman and soldier

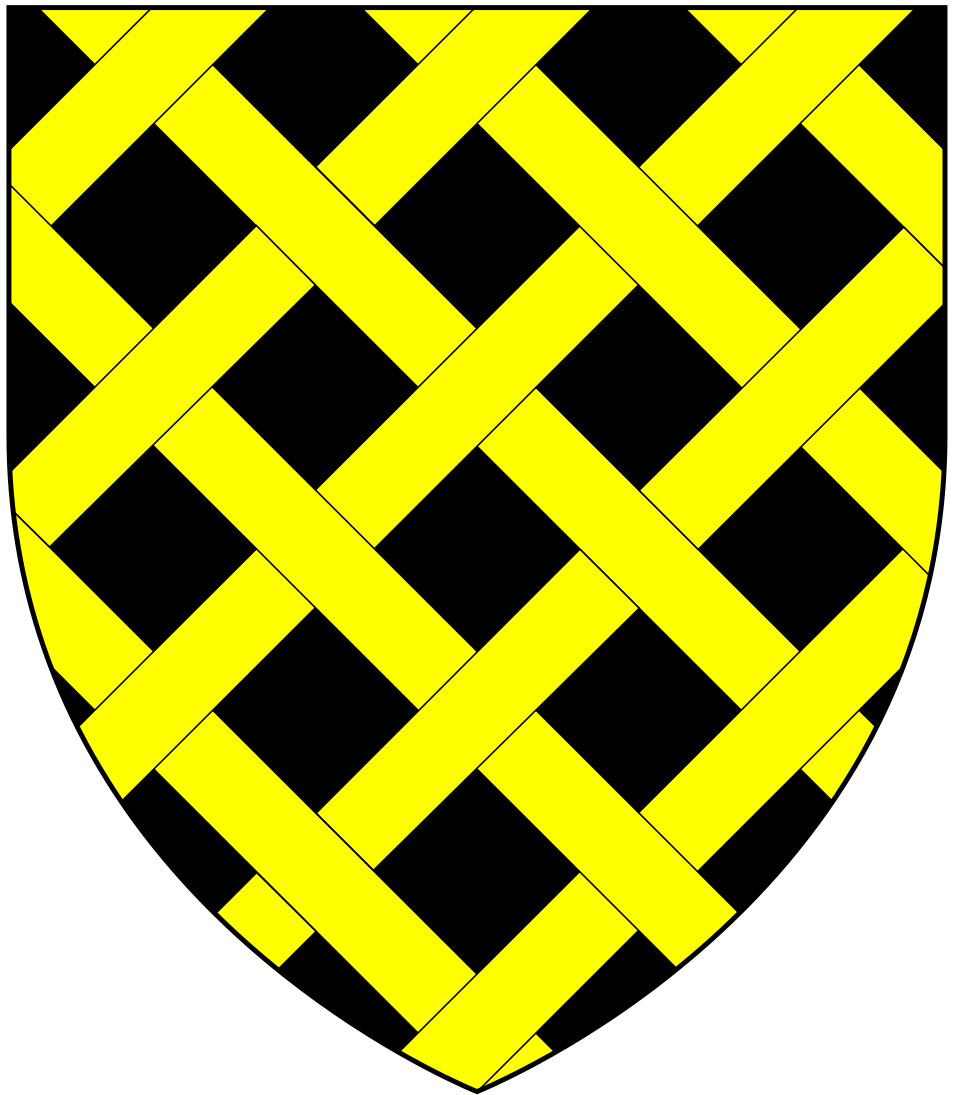
Arms of Maltravers: Sable fretty or

John Maltravers, 1st Baron Maltravers (1290?–1364) was an English nobleman and soldier.

== Early life ==
He was son of Sir John Maltravers (1266–1343?) of Lytchett Matravers, Dorset, born by his first wife Eleanor, about 1290. He was knighted, as was his father, with Edward, Prince of Wales, on 22 May 1306. He is said to have been taken prisoner at the battle of Bannockburn in 1314.

On 20 October 1318 Maltravers was chosen knight of the shire for Dorset. He seems to have sided with Thomas, Earl of Lancaster, against the king Edward II, and was in his early life a close associate of Roger Mortimer, 1st Earl of March. In August 1321 he received pardon for felonies committed in pursuit of the Despensers, but in the following December is described as the king's enemy. In January 1322 he was in arms against the king, and attacked and burnt the town of Bridgnorth. He was present at the battle of Boroughbridge on 16 March, and after the execution of Earl Thomas went overseas.

== Custodian of Edward II ==
Maltravers appears to have come back with Mortimer and Isabella of France in October 1326, receiving restitution of his lands in 1327, with a grant out of the lands of Hugh Despenser. On 3 April he was appointed one of the keepers of the deposed king Edward II, the other being his brother-in-law Thomas de Berkeley, 3rd Baron Berkeley. Adam Murimuth says that Edward was killed by order of Maltravers and Thomas Gourney, but later scholars doubt this. Maltravers and Berkeley remained in charge of the body until its burial at Gloucester on 21 October.

During the next few years Maltravers was employed on commissions of oyer and terminer. In that of February 1329, with Oliver de Ingham and others, he was appointed to try those who had supported Henry, Earl of Lancaster, in his intended rising at Bedford. He was also on several occasions a justice in eyre for the forests, and was in 1329 made keeper of the forests south of Trent. On 4 April 1329 the pardon granted to him two years earlier was confirmed, in consideration of his services to Isabella and the king at home and abroad. In May he accompanied the young king Edward III to France; and the next year was steward of the royal household.

== Exile ==
Maltravers was actively concerned in the death of Edmund of Woodstock, 1st Earl of Kent, in March 1330, and was on the commission appointed to track down his adherents. On 5 June 1330 he was summoned to parliament as Baron Maltravers; he was described as a baron by November 1329. On 24 September he was appointed constable of Corfe Castle, but on the fall of Mortimer shortly afterwards, Maltravers, like the other supporters of Isabella, was disgraced. In the parliament held in November he was condemned to death as a traitor on account of his share in the death of the Earl of Kent. On 3 December orders were given for his arrest, to prevent his going abroad, but he managed to escape to Germany.

In Flanders Maltravers built up a fortune; but, during the troubles after the death of Jacob van Artevelde, he lost it. When Edward III came to Flanders in July 1345, Maltravers met him at the Swyn estuary, and petitioned for leave to return to England, pleading that he had been condemned unheard. In consideration of services he had done the king in Flanders, he was granted the royal protection on 5 August, and allowed to return to England.

== Later life ==
The confirmation of Maltravers's pardon was delayed because in 1346 he was on business abroad, but the protection was renewed at the end of 1347. In June 1348 he was sent to Ghent, Bruges, and Ypres. Final restitution of his honour and lands was made on 8 February 1352. He was governor of the Channel Islands in 1351. He re-founded in 1351 the hospital of Bowes at St. Peter's Port in Guernsey. Maltravers died on 16 February 1364, and was buried at Lytchett.

== Marriages and children ==
He married twice:

- Firstly to Milicent de Berkeley, a daughter of Maurice de Berkeley, 2nd Baron Berkeley, and a sister of Thomas de Berkeley, one of the gaolers of King Edward II. By Milicent he had issue including:
  - John Maltravers (d.13 October 1350/60) who married a certain Wensliana, by whom he had issue:
    - Henry Maltravers, who died before his grandfather, on whose death the barony fell into abeyance between his two sisters.
    - Joan Maltravers, who was twice married but left no children;
    - Eleanor Maltravers, 2nd Baroness Maltravers, who married John Fitzalan, second son of Richard Fitzalan, 3rd Earl of Arundel. Her grandson John FitzAlan, 6th Earl of Arundel (1385–1421) succeeded as sixth Earl of Arundel in 1415, and Thomas Fitzalan, son and heir of William FitzAlan, 9th or 16th Earl of Arundel (1417–1487), sat in parliament during his father's life, from 1471 to 1488, as Baron Maltravers. Mary FitzAlan, daughter of Henry FitzAlan, 12th or 19th Earl of Arundel (1512–1580) carried the title to Thomas Howard, 4th Duke of Norfolk (1536-1572). In 1628 the barony of Maltravers was by Act of Parliament annexed to the Earldom of Arundel, and thus the title is still held today by the Duke of Norfolk.
- Secondly he married Agnes Bereford (d.post 1374), a daughter of Sir William Bereford, and widow successively of Sir John de Argentine (d. 1318) and Sir John de Nerford (d. 1329). She was buried at the Greyfriars, London.

== In fiction ==
Maltravers is a supporting character in Les Rois maudits (The Accursed Kings), a series of French historical novels by Maurice Druon. He was portrayed by André Mathis in the 1972 French miniseries adaptation of the series, and by Reus Alexandru in the 2005 adaptation.
