= John Fitzalan, 6th Earl of Arundel =

English nobleman (1385–1421)

John Fitzalan
- Baron Arundel
- Tenure: 1390–1421
- Other titles: Baron Maltravers; Earl of Arundel
- Born: 1 August 1385; Ditton manor, Stoke Poges, England
- Died: 21 April 1421 (aged 35)
- Spouse: Eleanor Berkeley
- Issue: John Fitzalan; William Fitzalan
- Parents: John Fitzalan; Elizabeth le Despenser

Arms of FitzAlan: Gules, a lion rampant or

John Fitzalan, 6th Earl of Arundel, 3rd Baron Maltravers (1 August 1385 – 21 April 1421) was an English nobleman.

== Early life ==
John Fitzalan was born 1 August 1385 at Ditton manor in Stoke Poges, England. He was the son of John Fitzalan, 2nd Baron Arundel (1364–1390), by his wife Elizabeth le Despenser, daughter of Edward le Despencer, 1st Baron le Despencer.

== Career ==
He was with the army in Scotland in 1383 and with the English Fleet on the western coast of France. He became 3rd Baron Arundel on his father's death in 1390 and Baron Maltravers on his grandmother's death in 1405.

In 1415, his father's cousin Thomas Fitzalan, 5th Earl of Arundel died, leaving John Fitzalan as his closest male heir. The Earldom of Arundel had been entailed to heirs male, and so the next year John Fitzalan was summoned to Parliament as Earl of Arundel. However, the inheritance, insofar as it related to the property of the prior earl rather than the title and Arundel Castle, was challenged and disputed between Arundel and the previous earl's sisters. The dispute was not settled during their lifetimes, and John Fitzalan was subsequently summoned to Parliament as Baron Maltravers, not as Earl of Arundel.

== Marriage and progeny ==
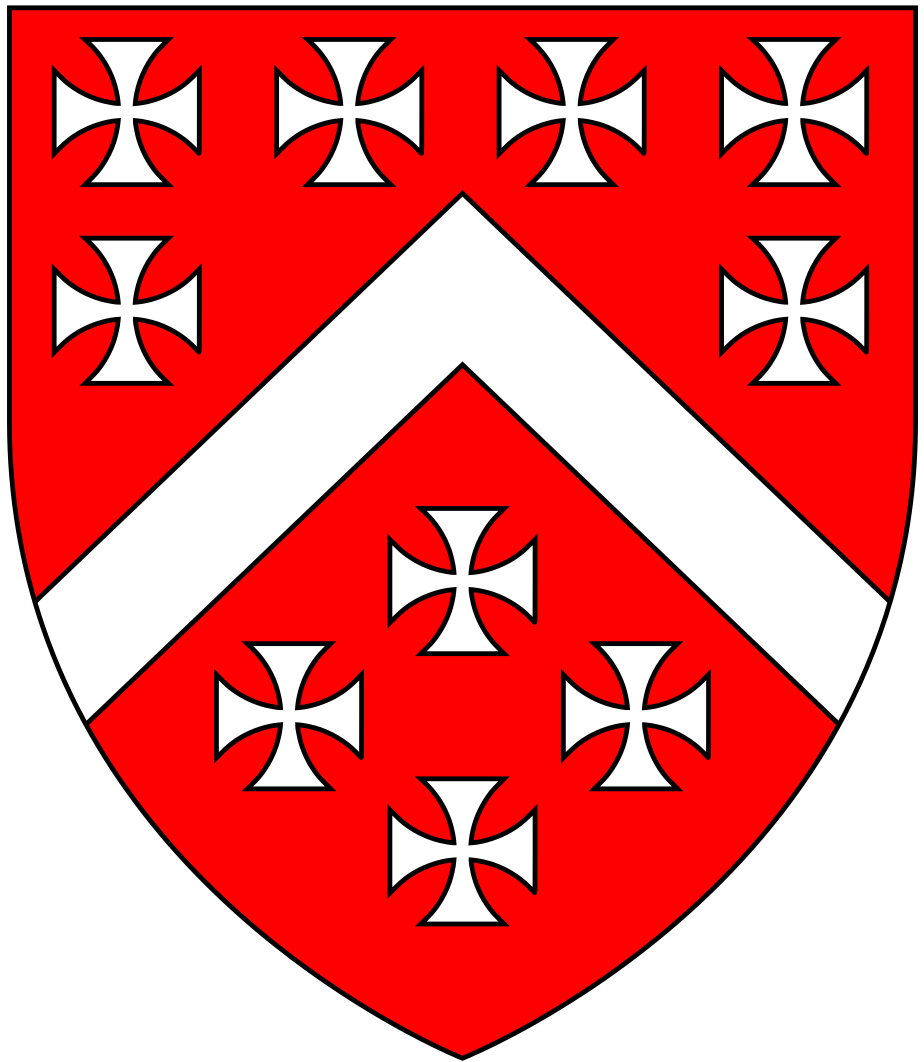
Arms of Berkeley: Gules, a chevron between ten crosses pattée six in chief and four in base argent

He married Eleanor Berkeley (died 1 August 1455), a daughter of Sir John Berkeley (1352–1428) of Beverstone Castle in Gloucestershire by his wife Elizabeth Betteshorne. She survived him and remarried twice, firstly to Sir Richard Poynings (died 10 June 1429), of Poynings in Sussex, by whom she had a daughter Eleanor Poynings (c. 1422–1484), suo jure Baroness Poynings, wife of Henry Percy, 3rd Earl of Northumberland, (1421–1461); and secondly to Walter Hungerford, 1st Baron Hungerford (died 9 August 1449). By his wife, John had two sons:

- John Fitzalan, 7th Earl of Arundel, who eventually succeeded in his claim to the earldom.
- William Fitzalan, 9th Earl of Arundel, who married Joan Neville, a daughter of Richard Neville, 5th Earl of Salisbury.

== Notes ==
Peerage of England
Preceded by Thomas Fitzalan	Earl of Arundel; 1415–1421	Succeeded by John Fitzalan VI
Preceded by Eleanor Maltravers	Baron Maltravers; 1405–1421	Succeeded by John Fitzalan VI
