= Baron Maltravers =

Barony in the Peerage of England

The title Baron Maltravers or Mautravers was created in the Peerage of England on 25 January and 23 October 1330 when John Maltravers was summoned to Parliament by writs directed Iohanni Mautravers Iuniori. The barony fell into abeyance among his granddaughters and coheirs, Joan and Eleanor, at his death on 16 February 1364. At the death of Joan without issue, Eleanor became, according to modern doctrine, de jure Baroness Maltravers. The barony later became a subsidiary title of the Earl of Arundel (subsequently the Duke of Norfolk).

== Barons Maltravers (1330) ==
- John Maltravers, 1st Baron Maltravers (c. 1290 – 16 February 1364) (in abeyance)
- Eleanor Maltravers (c. 1345 – 12 January 1405), granddaughter (abeyance terminated c. 1383)
- John FitzAlan, 13th Earl of Arundel (1385–1421), grandson, styled Baron Maltravers after the death of his grandmother, Eleanor, on 10 January 1405.

For further holders of the title see Earl of Arundel and Duke of Norfolk.
