= Duchess of Norfolk =

Title in the peerage of England

Duchess of Norfolk is a title used by the wife of the Duke of Norfolk, an extant title in the peerage of England. The Duke of Norfolk is the premier duke in the peerage of England and also, as Earl of Arundel, the premier earl.

The first creation was in 1397 for Margaret, Duchess of Norfolk, who held the title in her own right.

== Duchesses of Norfolk ==
1st creation (1397)

- Elizabeth Fitzalan, Duchess of Norfolk, wife of Thomas de Mowbray, 1st Duke of Norfolk
- Katherine Neville, Duchess of Norfolk, wife of John de Mowbray, 2nd Duke of Norfolk
- Lady Eleanor Bourchier, wife of John de Mowbray, 3rd Duke of Norfolk
- Elizabeth Talbot, Duchess of Norfolk, wife of John de Mowbray, 4th Duke of Norfolk

2nd creation (1477)

- Anne de Mowbray, 8th Countess of Norfolk, wife of Richard of Shrewsbury, Duke of York (and Duke of Norfolk)

3rd creation (1483)

- Agnes Howard, Duchess of Norfolk, 2nd wife of Thomas Howard, 2nd Duke of Norfolk
- Elizabeth Stafford, Duchess of Norfolk, wife of Thomas Howard, 3rd Duke of Norfolk
- Mary Fitzalan, 1st wife of Thomas Howard, 4th Duke of Norfolk
- Margaret Audley, Duchess of Norfolk, 2nd wife of Thomas Howard, 4th Duke of Norfolk
- Elizabeth Leyburne, 3rd wife of Thomas Howard, 4th Duke of Norfolk
- Jane Howard, Duchess of Norfolk (née Jane Bickerton), wife of Henry Howard, 6th Duke of Norfolk
- Mary Howard, Duchess of Norfolk (died 1705) (Mary Mordaunt, 7th Baroness Mordaunt), wife of Henry Howard, 7th Duke of Norfolk
- Maria Howard, Duchess of Norfolk (née Maria Shireburn), wife of Thomas Howard, 8th Duke of Norfolk
- Mary Howard, Duchess of Norfolk (died 1773) (née Mary Blount), wife of Edward Howard, 9th Duke of Norfolk
- Catherine Brockholes, wife of Charles Howard, 10th Duke of Norfolk
- Frances Scudamore, Duchess of Norfolk, wife of Charles Howard, 11th Duke of Norfolk
- Charlotte Fitzalan-Howard, Duchess of Norfolk (née Charlotte Leveson-Gower), wife of Henry Howard, 13th Duke of Norfolk
- Augusta Fitzalan-Howard, Duchess of Norfolk (née Augusta Lyons), wife of Henry Fitzalan-Howard, 14th Duke of Norfolk
- Flora Fitzalan-Howard, Duchess of Norfolk, (née Abney-Hastings), 1st wife of Henry Fitzalan-Howard, 15th Duke of Norfolk
- Gwendolen Fitzalan-Howard, Duchess of Norfolk (Gwendolen Constable-Maxwell, 12th Lady Herries of Terregles), 2nd wife of Henry Fitzalan-Howard, 15th Duke of Norfolk
- Lavinia Fitzalan-Howard, Duchess of Norfolk (née Lavinia Strutt), wife of Bernard Fitzalan-Howard, 16th Duke of Norfolk
- Anne Fitzalan-Howard, Duchess of Norfolk (née Anne Constable-Maxwell), wife of Miles Fitzalan-Howard, 17th Duke of Norfolk
- Georgina Fitzalan-Howard, Duchess of Norfolk (née Georgina Gore), ex-wife of Edward William Fitzalan-Howard, 18th Duke of Norfolk
- Francesca Fitzalan-Howard (née Francesca Bevan, later Herbert), wife of Edward William Fitzalan-Howard, 18th Duke of Norfolk
