= The Vatican Decrees in Their Bearing on Civil Allegiance =

1874 pamphlet by William Ewart Gladstone

The Vatican Decrees in their Bearing on Civil Allegiance is an anti-Catholic pamphlet written by British politician William Ewart Gladstone in November 1874.

== Outrage about papal infallibility ==
Prime Minister William Ewart Gladstone's feelings about the First Vatican Council, like those of most other English Protestants, were decidedly negative, and as prime minister, he came near to committing Britain to diplomatic intervention to influence the Council. However, he gave no public expression to his objections to the Council's definitions of papal supremacy and infallibility in Pastor aeternus before retiring from the leadership of his political party in 1874.

Drawn out of retirement back to Parliament to oppose the Public Worship Regulation Act 1874, Gladstone drafted an article defending Ritualism in the Church of England. Seeking to meet the charge made by Anglican opponents of Ritualism that Ritualism led to Romanism, Gladstone asserted that to Romanise the Church and people of England at that date would be impossible on account of the recent Vatican decrees.

While visiting Ignaz von Döllinger in Munich, Gladstone received news of his colleague Lord Ripon's conversion to Catholicism, and wrote Ripon a letter which Lady Ripon recalled, or conjectured, to have been so "unkind" that her husband cast it into the fire. The Times, commenting on this event, referred to Ripon as a man who "has renounced his mental and moral freedom, and has submitted himself to the guidance of the Roman Catholic priesthood." Reading the proofs of his article on "Ritualism and Ritual", Gladstone added to his other reasons why Romanisation of England would be impossible that "no one can become [Rome's] convert without renouncing his moral and mental freedom and placing his civil loyalty and duty at the mercy of another", probably unconsciously adopting the language of The Times. The passage thus read:

But there is a question which it is the special purpose of this paper to suggest for consideration by my fellow-Christians generally, which is more practical and of greater importance, as it seems, to me, and has far stronger claims on the attention of the nation and of the rulers of the Church, than the question whether a handful of the clergy are or not engaged in an utterly hopeless and visionary effort to Romanise the Church and people of England. At no time since the bloody reign of Mary has such a scheme been possible. But if it had been possible in the seventeenth or eighteenth centuries, it would still have become impossible in the nineteenth; when Rome has substituted for the proud boast of semper eadem a policy of violence and change in faith; when she has refurbished and paraded anew every rusty tool she was fondly thought to have disused; when no one can become her convert without renouncing his moral and mental freedom, and placing his civil loyalty and duty at the mercy of another; and when she has equally repudiated modern thought and ancient history. I cannot persuade myself to feel alarm as to the final issue of her crusades in England, and this although I do not undervalue her great powers of mischief.

Gladstone's attack upon Pastor aeternus created a sensation, and in November, he attempted to vindicate these much-quoted statements in a tract titled The Vatican Decrees in Their Bearing on Civil Allegiance. The pamphlet sold 150,000 copies by the end of 1874.

== Church and State ==
Gladstone claimed that the decree had placed British Catholics in a dilemma over their loyalty to the Crown and their loyalty to the Pope. He urged British Catholics to reject papal infallibility as they had opposed the Spanish Armada of 1588.

== Rule of law against despotism ==
He described the Catholic Church as "an Asian monarchy: nothing but one giddy height of despotism, and one dead level of religious subservience". He further claimed that the Pope wanted to destroy the rule of law and replace it with arbitrary tyranny and then to hide these "crimes against liberty beneath a suffocating cloud of incense".

== Later pamphlet in 1875 ==
In February 1875, Gladstone published a second anti-Catholic pamphlet, which was a defence of his earlier pamphlet and a reply to his critics, Vaticanism: an Answer to Reproofs and Replies.

== Responses from Catholics ==
=== Letter to the Duke of Norfolk ===
John Henry Newman's Letter to the Duke of Norfolk was a response to Gladstone's claim that Catholics have no mental freedom.

=== Immortale Dei ===
Immortale Dei is an 1885 encyclical of Pope Leo XIII on church-state relations, specifically on the topic of civil allegiance, which is defined as a duty of loyalty and obedience which a person owes to the state of which he is a citizen.
