= Letter to the Duke of Norfolk =

Book by John Henry Newman

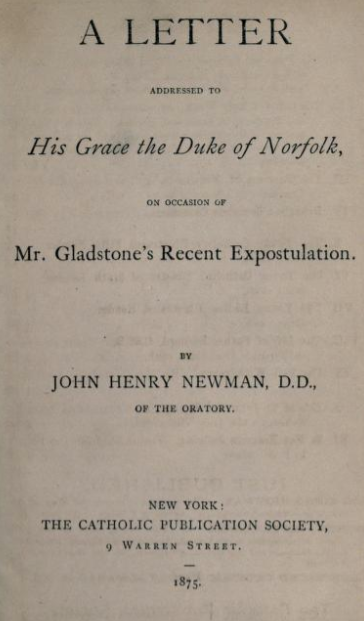
- Author: St John Henry Newman
- Publication date: 1875

Letter to the Duke of Norfolk is a book written in 1875 by St John Henry Newman. Consisting of about 150 pages, it was meant as a response to Protestant-Catholic polemics that had emerged in the wake of the First Vatican Council.

== Background ==
=== Attitude of Newman to the Vatican Council ===
At the time of Newman's reception into the Catholic Church in 1845, most Catholic theologians held that the pope's ex cathedra decisions of matters of faith and morals were infallible and irreformable of themselves, though a minority attributed infallible teaching authority only to the whole body of Catholic bishops, and held that papal decrees were not irreformable until they had received the assent of the body of bishops either in an ecumenical council, or by subscription to such decrees outside of a council.

From the time of his conversion, Newman held to papal infallibility, but preferred to remain vague on the subject in published works, as he wished to avoid presenting contentious theological opinions as if they were dogma. Nevertheless, Newman was able to cite a number of his published statements over the years when writing in 1872, "I have for these 25 years spoken in behalf of the Pope's infallibility." In a Latin summary of his ideas of development submitted for the criticism of Giovanni Perrone in 1847, Newman accepted the Roman Pontiff speaking ex cathedra and the definition of an ecumenical council as two different means by which the sense of the Church passes into objective dogmas.

In Newman's eyes, papal infallibility was a conclusion logically entailed by premisses which were dogmatically certain, and in that sense, he held it as a "theological opinion". Such deductions were capable of being defined by the Church as dogmas. Yet when the First Vatican Council entertained defining papal infallibility as a dogma, Newman bitterly opposed the definition, regarding it as inopportune.

=== Anti-Catholic statements of Gladstone ===
Prime Minister William Ewart Gladstone's feelings about the Vatican Council, like those of most other English Protestants, were decidedly negative, and as prime minister, he came near to committing Britain to diplomatic intervention to influence the council. However, he gave no public expression to his objections to the council's definitions of papal supremacy and infallibility in Pastor aeternus before retiring from the leadership of his political party in 1874.

Drawn out of retirement back to Parliament to oppose the Public Worship Regulation Act 1874, Gladstone drafted an article defending Ritualism in the Church of England. Seeking to meet the charge made by Anglican opponents of Ritualism that Ritualism led to Romanism, Gladstone asserted that to Romanise the Church and people of England at that date would be impossible on account of the recent Vatican decrees:

But there is a question which it is the special purpose of this paper to suggest for consideration by my fellow-Christians generally, which is more practical and of greater importance, as it seems, to me, and has far stronger claims on the attention of the nation and of the rulers of the Church, than the question whether a handful of the clergy are or not engaged in an utterly hopeless and visionary effort to Romanise the Church and people of England. At no time since the bloody reign of Mary has such a scheme been possible. But if it had been possible in the seventeenth or eighteenth centuries, it would still have become impossible in the nineteenth; when Rome has substituted for the proud boast of semper eadem a policy of violence and change in faith; when she has refurbished and paraded anew every rusty tool she was fondly thought to have disused; when no one can become her convert without renouncing his moral and mental freedom, and placing his civil loyalty and duty at the mercy of another; and when she has equally repudiated modern thought and ancient history. I cannot persuade myself to feel alarm as to the final issue of her crusades in England, and this although I do not undervalue her great powers of mischief.

In the view of Gladstone and other opponents of Pastor aeternus who wished to make its dogmatic definitions ridiculous by construing them in the most extreme sense possible, Rome had "repudiated ... ancient history" because historical study demonstrated that papal infallibility was an innovation which had not been known or practised in the early Church, and that some popes had erred; Rome had "refurbished and paraded anew every rusty tool she was fondly thought to have disused" because a variety of medieval papal bulls asserting ecclesiastical authority over civil rulers, including the papal power of deposing kings, were taken to be ex cathedra acts which the council had defined to be infallible, and therefore newly binding upon Catholic belief; and Rome had "repudiated modern thought" by denying a Catholic the "moral and mental freedom" to judge for himself about a matter the pope had defined, as well as by enshrining the pope as a monarch superior to all civil governments and with a preemptive claim on the allegiance of Christians.

Gladstone's attack upon Pastor aeternus created a sensation, and in November, he attempted to vindicate these much-quoted statements in a tract titled The Vatican Decrees in Their Bearing on Civil Allegiance. The pamphlet sold 150,000 copies by the end of 1874.

== Catholic reaction ==
In the book, Newman comments on the injustice of Prime Minister William Ewart Gladstone's claim that Catholics have "no mental freedom". Newman states that Catholics "do not deserve his injurious reproach that we are captives and slaves of the Pope".

The book is formally addressed to the Duke of Norfolk, whose family was among the most prominent recusants after the Protestant Reformation.

The Catechism of the Catholic Church quotes the book in paragraph 1778.

== Sources ==
=== Primary sources ===
==== Anti-papal literature ====
- Gladstone, W. E. (October 1874a). "Ritualism and Ritual". The Contemporary Review. XXIV (5): 663–81.
- Gladstone, W. E. (1874b). The Vatican Decrees in Their Bearing on Civil Allegiance: A Political Expostulation. London: John Murray.

==== Pro-papal literature ====
- Manning, Henry Edward (1874). Cæsarism and Ultramontanism (Second ed.). London: Burns and Oates.

=== Secondary literature ===
- Altholz, Josef L. (January 1972). "The Vatican Decrees Controversy, 1874–1875". The Catholic Historical Review. 57 (4): 593–605. JSTOR 25018950.
- Butler, Cuthbert (1926). "Aftermath of the Council". The Life & Times of Bishop Ullathorne, 1806–1889. Vol. II. London: Burns Oates and Washbourne Ltd. pp. 80–122.
- Dibble, Romuald A. (1955). John Henry Newman: The Concept of Infallible Doctrinal Authority. Washington, D.C.: The Catholic University of America Press.
- Ward, Wilfrid (1912). "The Gladstone Controversy (1874–1878)". The Life of John Henry Cardinal Newman. Vol. II. London: Longmans, Green, and Co. pp. 397–432.
