= Duke of Norfolk =

Dukedom in the Peerage of England

Dukedom of Norfolk
- Arms: Quarterly, 1st: Gules on a Bend between six Cross-crosslets fitchy Argent an Escutcheon Or charged with a Demi-lion rampant pierced through the mouth by an arrow within a Double Tressure flory counterflory of the first (Howard); 2nd: Gules three Lions passant gardant in pale Or, Armed and Langued Azure, in chief a Label of three points Argent (Plantagenet of Norfolk); 3rd: Checky Or and Azure (Warenne); 4th: Gules a Lion rampant Or, Armed and Langued Azure (Fitzalan).
- Creation date: 1397 (forfeit 1399–1425) (first creation); 1477 (second creation); 1483 (forfeit 1485–1514, 1547–1553, 1572–1660) (third creation)
- Created by: Richard II (first creation); Henry VI (first creation, restored); Edward IV (second creation); Richard III (third creation); Henry VIII (third creation, restored); Mary I (third creation, restored); Charles II (third creation, restored)
- Peerage: Peerage of England
- First holder: Thomas de Mowbray
- Present holder: Edward Fitzalan-Howard, 18th Duke of Norfolk
- Heir apparent: Henry Fitzalan-Howard, Earl of Arundel
- Remainder to: 1st Duke's heirs male of the body lawfully begotten
- Subsidiary titles: Earl of Arundel; Earl of Surrey; Earl of Norfolk; Earl Marshal (office); Baron Beaumont; Baron Maltravers; Baron FitzAlan; Baron Clun; Baron Oswaldestre; Baron Howard of Glossop
- Extinction date: 1476 (first creation); 1483 (second creation)
- Seats: Arundel Castle; Carlton Towers
- Former seats: Framlingham Castle; Bungay Castle; Clun Castle; Worksop Manor

Duke of Norfolk is a title in the Peerage of England. The premier non-royal peer, the Duke of Norfolk is additionally the premier duke and earl in the English peerage. The seat of the Duke of Norfolk is Arundel Castle in Sussex, although the title refers to the county of Norfolk. The current duke is Edward Fitzalan-Howard, 18th Duke of Norfolk. The dukes have historically been Catholic; during the 16th-19th centuries, therefore, members of the family were amongst the most prominent of English Catholic recusants.

All past and present dukes have been descended from Edward I. The son of Thomas Howard, 3rd Duke of Norfolk, was Henry Howard, Earl of Surrey; the earl was descended from Edward III. As all subsequent dukes after Thomas Howard, 4th Duke of Norfolk are descendants of the Earl of Surrey, this means they are also descended from Edward III.

The 2nd Duke of Norfolk was the grandfather of both Anne Boleyn and Catherine Howard and the great-grandfather of Queen Elizabeth I.

== History ==
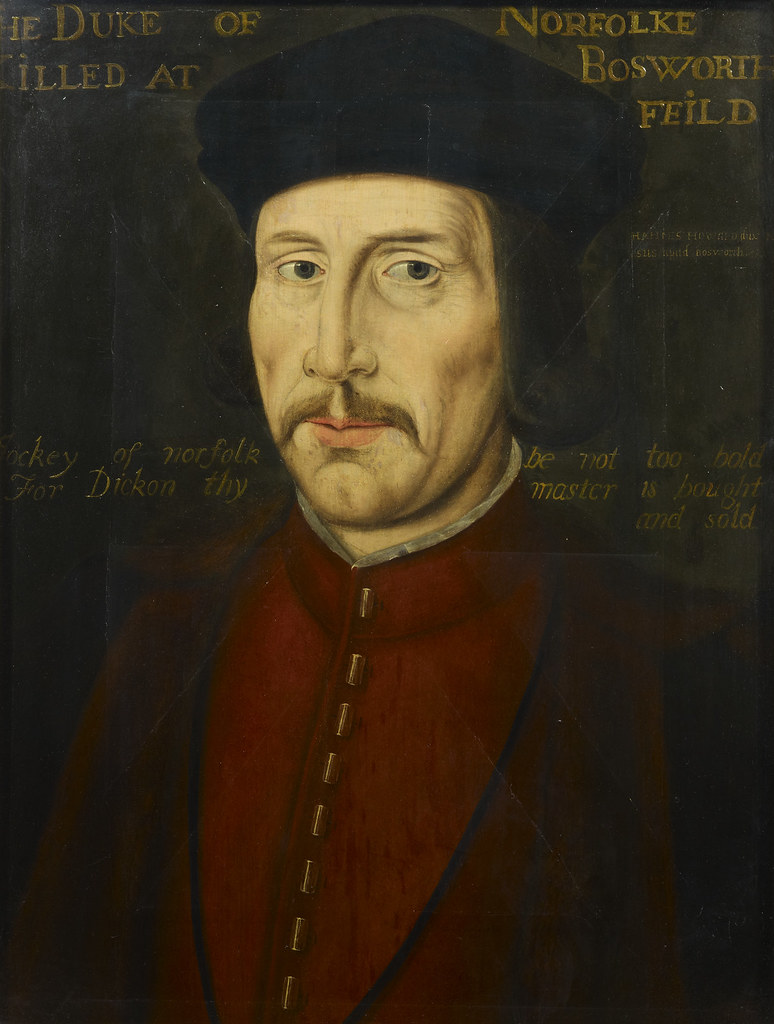
John Howard, 1st Duke of Norfolk (3rd creation)

Augmentation to the arms of Thomas Howard, 2nd Duke of Norfolk, for his services at the Battle of Flodden Blazon: The Royal Shield of Scotland, having a demi-lion only, which is pierced through the mouth with an arrow.

Arms of Thomas de Mowbray, 1st Duke of Norfolk (1st Creation)

Before the Dukes of Norfolk, there were the Bigod Earls of Norfolk, starting with Roger Bigod from Normandy (died 1107). Their male line ended with Roger Bigod, 5th Earl of Norfolk, who died without an heir in 1306, so their titles and estates reverted to the crown. Edward II then granted his brother, Thomas of Brotherton, the title of Earl of Norfolk in 1312. It passed to Thomas's daughter (and granddaughter of Edward I), Margaret, and then to her grandson, Thomas Mowbray.

When Richard II made Thomas Mowbray the Duke of Norfolk in 1397, he conferred upon him the estates and titles (including Earl Marshal) that had belonged to the Earls of Norfolk. His elderly grandmother, Margaret, was still alive, and so at the same time she was created Duchess of Norfolk for life. Mowbray died in exile in 1399, months after his grandmother, and his dukedom was repealed. His widow took the title of Countess of Norfolk.

Between 1401 and 1476, the Mowbray family held the title and estates of the Duke of Norfolk. John de Mowbray, 4th Duke of Norfolk, died without male issue in 1476, his only surviving child being the 3-year-old Anne Mowbray. A marriage was arranged between Anne and Richard, Duke of York, the 4-year-old son of Edward IV. She remained Richard's child bride until she died at the age of 8.

In accordance with the marriage arrangements, Richard inherited the lands and wealth of the Mowbray family. He was also made Duke of Norfolk. However, upon the death of Edward IV, the throne was offered to Edward's brother, Richard III. After Prince Richard was lodged in June 1483 in the Tower of London, where his elder brother (briefly Edward V) was too, both Richard and Edward were declared illegitimate. They subsequently disappeared, and the titles of both York and Norfolk were forfeited to the crown.

This left John Howard, the son of Thomas Mowbray's elder daughter Margaret, as heir to the dukedom, and his support for Richard III's accession secured his creation as 1st Duke of Norfolk in 1483, in the title's third creation. From this point to the present, the title has remained in the hands of the descendants of John Howard, except for periods when it was temporarily forfeited.

The Catholic faith of the Howard dynasty often resulted in conflict with the reigning monarch, particularly during and after the reign of Henry VIII. In 1546, Thomas Howard, the third Duke, fell out of favour with the dying Henry and was attainted on 27 January 1547; he was stripped of his titles and his lands reverted to the Crown. Imprisoned in the Tower of London, he narrowly escaped execution through Henry's death the following day, but remained imprisoned until the death of Edward VI and the accession of the Catholic Queen Mary to the English throne in 1553, upon which his lands and titles were restored to him. The Duke died the following year, aged around 81, and was succeeded by his grandson Thomas as the fourth Duke of Norfolk.

Following Mary's death in 1558 and the accession of her sister Elizabeth I, the Duke was imprisoned for scheming to marry Elizabeth's cousin Mary, Queen of Scots. After his release under house arrest in 1570 and subsequent participation in the Ridolfi plot to enthrone Mary and Catholicism in England, he was executed in 1572 for treason and his lands and titles again became forfeit.

In 1660, the fourth Duke's great-great-grandson, the 23rd Earl of Arundel, was restored to the family lands and dukedom as the fifth duke. Mentally infirm, the fifth Duke never married and died in 1677. He was succeeded by his younger brother Henry as the 6th Duke, through whom the 7th Duke, 8th Duke and 9th Duke of Norfolk were descended in the male-line.

At the death of the 9th Duke, the title was inherited in 1777 by his heir male, Charles Howard, a grandson of Charles Howard of Greystoke, a younger brother of the 5th and 6th Dukes. He was succeeded by his son, Charles, whose lack of a legitimate male heir resulted in the title passing to Bernard Howard, a great-grandson of Bernard Howard of Glossop, the youngest brother of the 5th and 6th Dukes. The title then passed to his son in 1842, Henry Howard, 13th Duke of Norfolk, who was the father of Henry Fitzalan-Howard, 14th Duke of Norfolk, and Edward Fitzalan-Howard, 1st Baron Howard of Glossop. By royal licence dated 26 April 1842, the 13th Duke added "Fitzalan" before his children's surnames (but not his own), so they all became Fitzalan-Howard, which surname their male-line descendants have borne ever since. Their ancestor, Thomas Howard, 4th Duke of Norfolk, married Mary FitzAlan (daughter and heiress of Henry Fitzalan, 12th Earl of Arundel) in 1555.

The title passed through the line of the elder brother from 1856 until the death in 1975 of Bernard Fitzalan-Howard, 16th Duke of Norfolk without male issue. Consequently, he was succeeded by his second cousin once removed, Miles Stapleton-Fitzalan-Howard, 17th Duke of Norfolk, who was a great-grandson of the aforementioned 1st Baron Howard of Glossop.

The current Duke of Norfolk is Edward Fitzalan-Howard, 18th Duke of Norfolk, who succeeded his father, Miles Stapleton-Fitzalan-Howard, 17th Duke of Norfolk, in 2002. He succeeded as 18th Duke of Norfolk (Premier Duke of England), 36th Earl of Arundel (Premier Earl of England), 19th Earl of Surrey, 16th Earl of Norfolk, 13th Baron Beaumont, 26th Baron Maltravers, 16th Baron FitzAlan, 16th Baron Clun, 16th Baron Oswaldestre, and 5th Baron Howard of Glossop.

The 15th Duke of Norfolk owned almost 50,000 acres with 19,400 acres in the West Riding of Yorkshire, 21,000 acres in Sussex and 4,400 acres in Norfolk.

== Duties and other titles ==
In addition to the ducal title, the dukes of Norfolk also hold the hereditary position of Earl Marshal, which has the duty of organising state occasions such as the coronation of the monarch and the state opening of Parliament. For the last five centuries, save some periods when it was under attainder, both the dukedom and the earl-marshalship have been in the hands of the Howard family. According to the House of Lords Act 1999, due to his duties as Earl Marshal, Norfolk is one of only two hereditary peers automatically admitted to the House of Lords, without being elected by the general body of hereditary peers (the other being the Lord Great Chamberlain).

The Duke of Norfolk participates in the formal ceremony surrounding the annual State Opening of Parliament held at the Palace of Westminster each year. He is among the four individuals who precede the monarch in procession to the House of Lords chamber, and one of the two of these who would traditionally walk facing the sovereign (thus backwards), though this has not been practised in recent years.

As the Earl Marshal, the Duke of Norfolk is head of the College of Arms, through which he regulates all matters connected with armorial bearings and standards, in addition to controlling the arrangements for state functions. He is one of three claimants to the title of Chief Butler of England.

The Duke of Norfolk currently holds the following subsidiary titles (year of present creation noted for each):

- Earl of Arundel (1289)
- Earl of Surrey (1483)
- Earl of Norfolk (1644)
- Baron Beaumont (1309)
- Baron Maltravers (1330)
- Baron FitzAlan (1627)
- Baron Clun (1627)
- Baron Oswaldestre (1627)
- Baron Howard of Glossop (1869)

All titles are in the Peerage of England, save for the most recent, the Barony of Howard of Glossop which is in the Peerage of the United Kingdom. All descend to heirs male except the Barony of Beaumont, which can pass in the female line. The style Earl of Arundel is used as a courtesy title by the Duke's eldest son, the present holder being Henry Fitzalan-Howard, Earl of Arundel. The style Lord Maltravers is used as a courtesy title by the eldest son of the Duke's eldest son (the Duke's grandson).

== Heraldic achievement (coat of arms) ==
Coat of arms of the Duke of Norfolk
| Adopted 1660 (by the 5th Duke of Norfolk) Coronet A Coronet of a Duke Crest 1st: Issuant from a Ducal Coronet Or a pair of Wings Gules each charged with a Bend between six Cross-crosslets fitchy Argent (Howard); 2nd: On a Chapeau Gules turned up Ermine a Lion statant gardant with tail extended Or gorged with a Ducal Coronet Argent (Thomas of Brotherton); 3rd: On a Mount Vert a Horse passant Argent holding in the mouth a Slip of Oak Vert fructed proper (Fitzalan). Helm Helm of a peer Escutcheon Quarterly, 1st: Gules on a Bend between six Cross-crosslets fitchy Argent an Escutcheon Or charged with a Demi-lion rampant pierced through the mouth by an arrow within a Double Tressure flory counterflory of the first (Howard); 2nd: Gules three Lions passant gardant in pale Or, Armed and Langued Azure, in chief a Label of three points Argent (Plantagenet of Norfolk); 3rd: Checky Or and Azure (Warenne); 4th: Gules a Lion rampant Or, Armed and Langued Azure (Fitzalan). Supporters Dexter a Lion, sinister a Horse both Argent the latter holding in the mouth a Slip of Oak Vert fructed proper. Motto Sola Virtus Invicta (Latin for "Virtue alone is unconquered"). Other elements Placed behind the shield are two gold batons in saltire enamelled at the ends in black, which represent the Duke of Norfolk's office as Earl Marshal and Hereditary Marshal of England. Symbolism The shield on the bend in the first quarter of the arms was granted as an augmentation of honour by Henry VIII to the 2nd Duke of Norfolk, to commemorate his victory at the Battle of Flodden. It is a modification of the Royal coat of arms of Scotland. Instead of its normal rampant position, the lion is shown cut in half with an arrow through its mouth, commemorating the death of King James IV at the battle. |

== Estates and residences ==
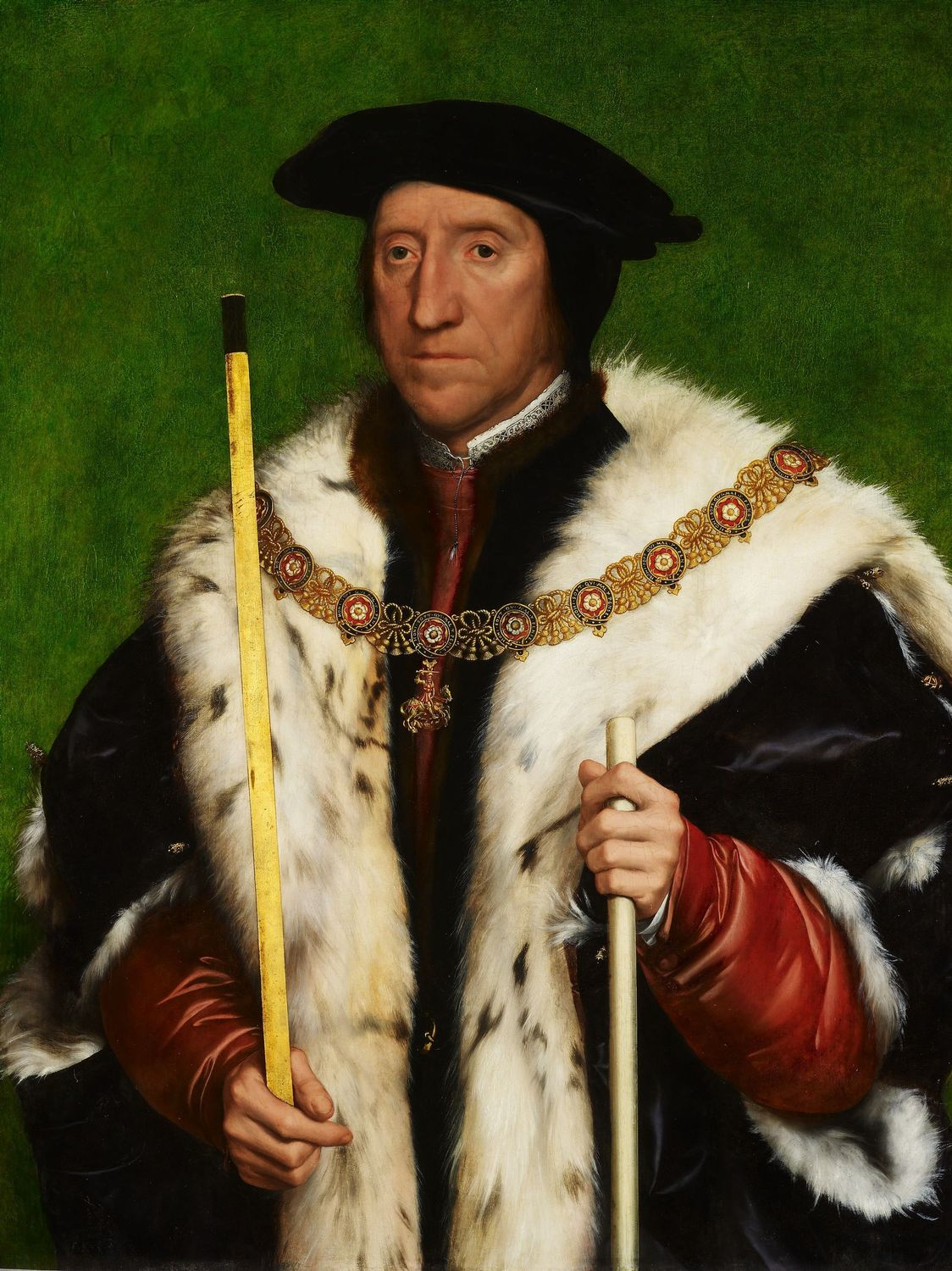
Thomas Howard, 3rd Duke of Norfolk, holding the baton of the Earl Marshal

In the 1883 edition of John Bateman's The Great Landowners of Great Britain and Ireland, Henry Fitzalan-Howard, 15th Duke of Norfolk's estates were recorded as spanning 49,866 acres across England, including 19,440 acres in the West Riding of Yorkshire, 21,446 acres in Sussex, 4,460 acres in Norfolk, 3,172 acres in Surrey, 1,274 acres in Derbyshire, 47 acres in Suffolk, 25 acres in Staffordshire, and 2 acres in Nottinghamshire, which produced a combined annual income of £75,596. In this edition, Bateman notes that total annual income listed was not inclusive of additional revenue generated from mining and shooting rights on the Duke's estates.

=== Country seats ===
The main residences commonly associated with the Dukes of Norfolk are: Framlingham Castle, Bungay Castle, as well as Clun Castle in Shropshire, which are now largely ruins; Worksop Manor, Carlton Towers, Norfolk House in London, and most notably Arundel Castle.

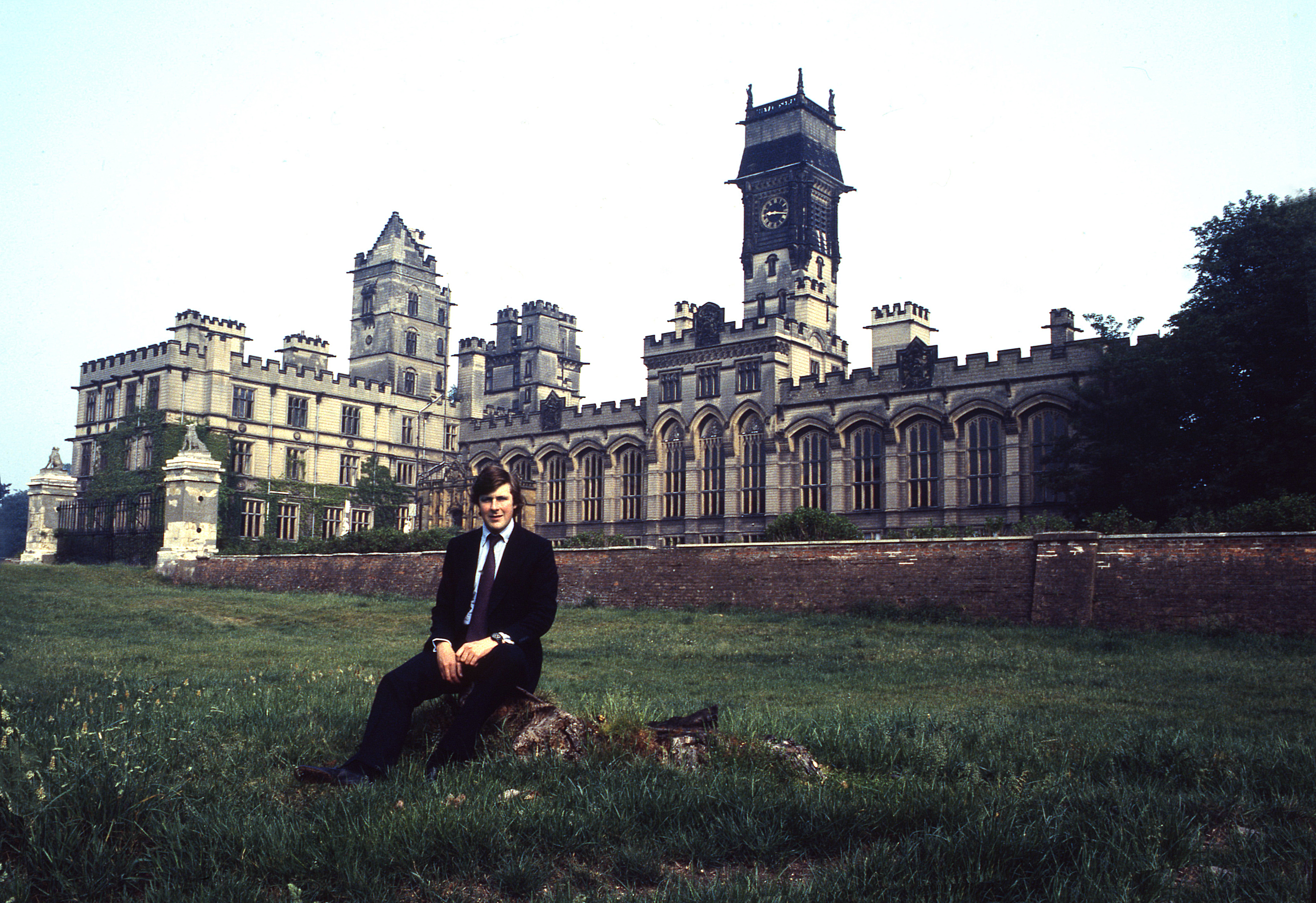
The 18th Duke of Norfolk (then Earl of Arundel) at Carlton Towers in 1981

Framlingham Castle was originally a part of the properties of the Earls of Norfolk, but when the title fell from use, the castle was administered by the crown. In 1397, it was given to Thomas Mowbray, 1st Duke of Norfolk, by King Richard II. And when the Mowbray line became extinct, it passed eventually to the Howard family. Major repairs to this castle were carried out in 1485 by John Howard, 1st Duke of Norfolk (second creation). The castle would remain in the Howard family, and thus the Dukes of Norfolk, for a while, but would eventually pass from their possession. In 1553, for example, Framlingham was given to Mary Tudor, sister of King Edward VI.

Bungay Castle, in Bungay, Suffolk, was also originally a part of the properties of the Earls of Norfolk. In 1483, it passed into the possession of John Howard, 1st Duke of Norfolk, and the family continued to own it, apart from brief periods, until the late 20th century. However, the castle has long been in a state of decay. Consequently, in 1987, the 17th Duke of Norfolk presented the castle to the town, which had already begun its own restoration attempts, along with an endowment for funding towards its preservation. It is now owned and administered by the Castle Trust.

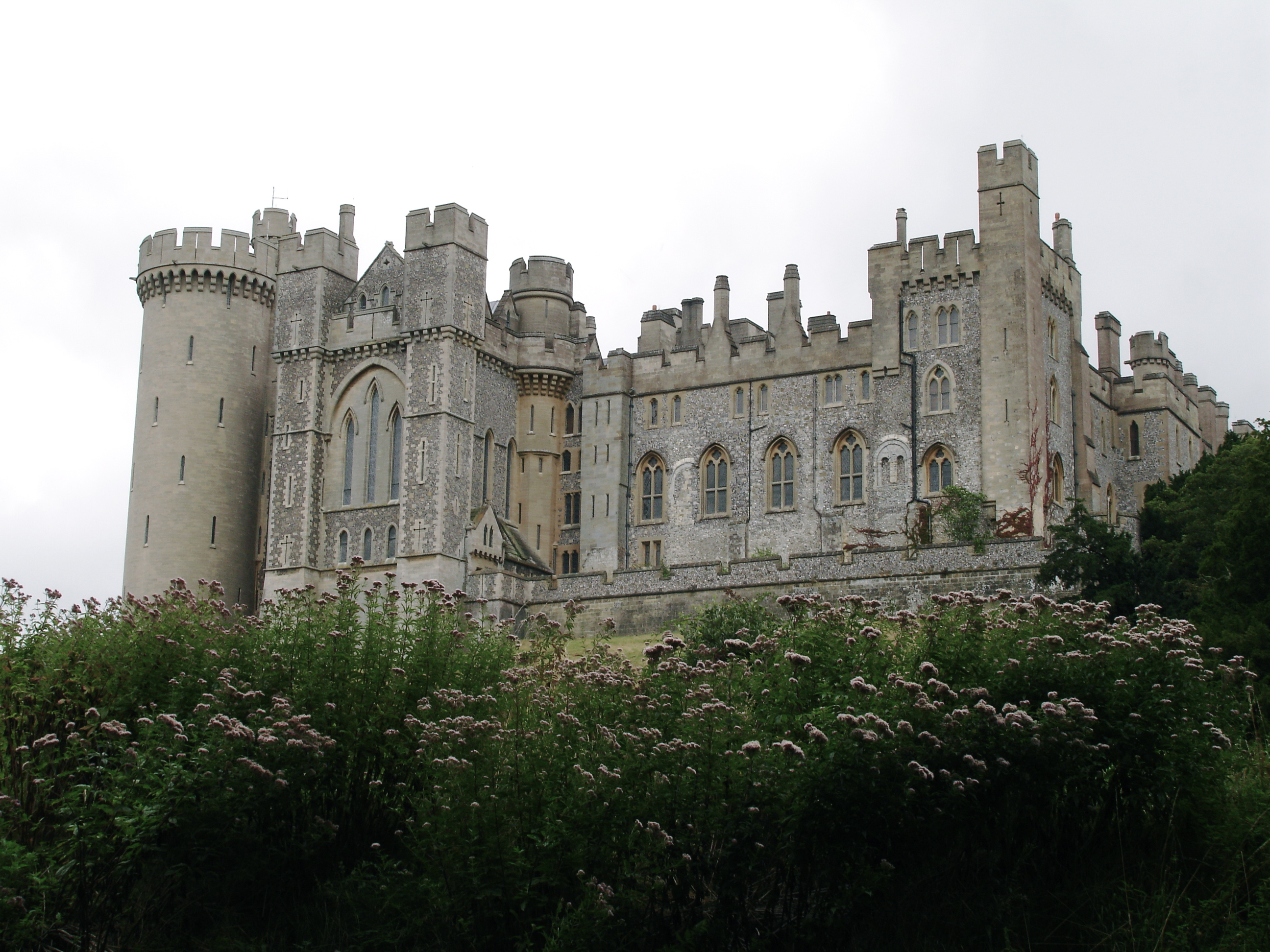
Arundel Castle

Carlton Towers is in Carlton, North Yorkshire. It is a Victorian gothic country house remodelled by Edward Welby Pugin for the 8th Baron Beaumont. It is the Yorkshire home of the Duke of Norfolk. Though the Duke of Norfolk's family still live in part of the house, it is now largely used for wedding receptions and similar events.

Arundel Castle in West Sussex has been the principal seat of the Dukes of Norfolk and their ancestors for more than 850 years. Built in the 11th century by Roger de Montgomery, Earl of Arundel, the castle was seized by the crown in 1102. Some 50 years later, in 1155, King Henry II, who had added on to the castle, confirmed William d'Aubigny as Earl of Arundel; he was given the honour, title and castle of Arundel. Arundel Castle is still to this day the home of The Duke and Duchess of Norfolk and their children. The Fitzalan Chapel, founded in 1390 by the 4th Earl of Arundel, is located on the western grounds outside the castle, and has been the burial place of the most recent Dukes of Norfolk.

Glossop Hall is an occasional residence of the Dukes, situated in the High Peak District of Derbyshire. As the family became closely connected with Sheffield, the Farm in Glossop became increasingly used, particularly: when Henry Howard lived there in the 1760s; when the 14th Duke enlarged The Farm as an occasional residence; and during the time of the 15th Duke, Henry Granville Fitzalan-Howard, who had an interest in the activities of the city. The Glossop estate was sold by the family in 1925.

=== London residences ===
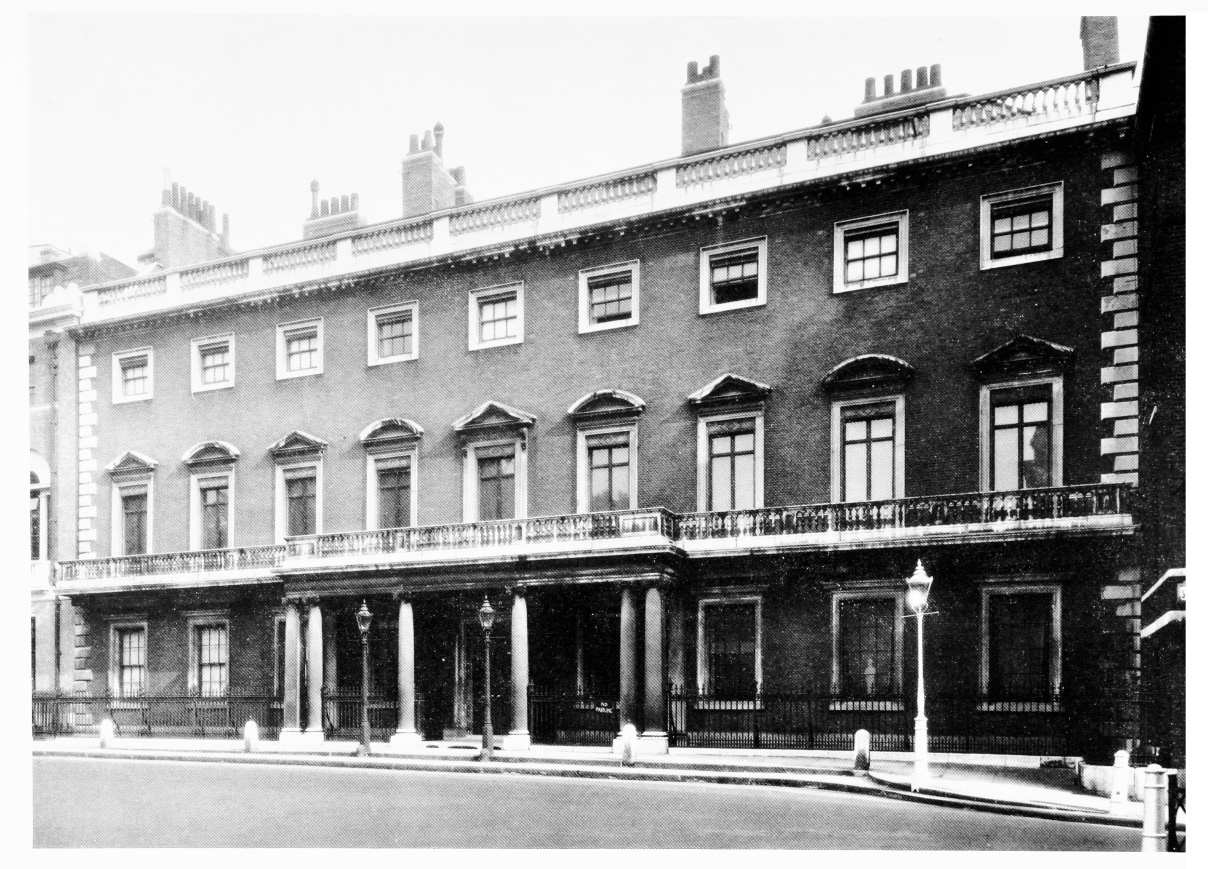
Norfolk House in 1932

The London residence of the Dukes of Norfolk was Norfolk House at No. 31 St. James’s Square from 1756 until 1938. Bernard Fitzalan-Howard, 16th Duke of Norfolk commenced negotiations to sell Norfolk House in 1928, and attempted to sell the house at auction in July 1930; after an opening bid of £100,000, the house was withdrawn after bidding reached £250,000. Norfolk House was eventually sold in November 1937, and demolished in 1938.

Following the family's departure from Norfolk House, in March 1938 The 16th Duke purchased the lease of a new London home, No. 14 Belgrave Square, from William Ward, 3rd Earl of Dudley. As a result of the Second World War, 14 Belgrave Square was requisitioned by the British Government in 1942, to be used as offices for the Ministry of Education. In January 1951 the house became the temporary headquarters of the NATO Council of Deputies, after which the house was used as offices used by the Ministry of Works, which continued to occupy the house after the end of the war.

Although the Howard family did not resume their use of 14 Belgrave Square as a town residence, the Duke was responsible for planning and overseeing arrangements for the Coronation of Elizabeth II in his capacity as Earl Marshal; in October 1952 the Ministry of Works temporarily relocated the offices of the staff of the Earl Marshall at No. 13 and 14 Belgrave Square, where the Duke was granted a small personal office at the rear of his former home.

In April 1954 the Ministry of Works released No. 14 Belgrave Square from requisition; however, in May 1954 The Daily Telegraph reported that the Duke of Norfolk had decided not to resume using the house as a private residence, and instead intended to sell the lease of 14 Belgrave Square. The Duke's lease of the house then had a remaining term of eighty years, with an annual ground rent of £300. By December 1956 the house was being used as offices by the Society for Analytical Chemistry.

== List of titleholders ==
=== Duchess of Norfolk (1397) ===
Created by Richard II of England (for life)
| Name | Period | Spouse | Notes | Other titles |
|---|---|---|---|---|
| Margaret (c. 1320 – 1399) | 1397–1399 | widowed | Granddaughter of King Edward I | Countess of Norfolk |

=== Dukes of Norfolk (1397) ===
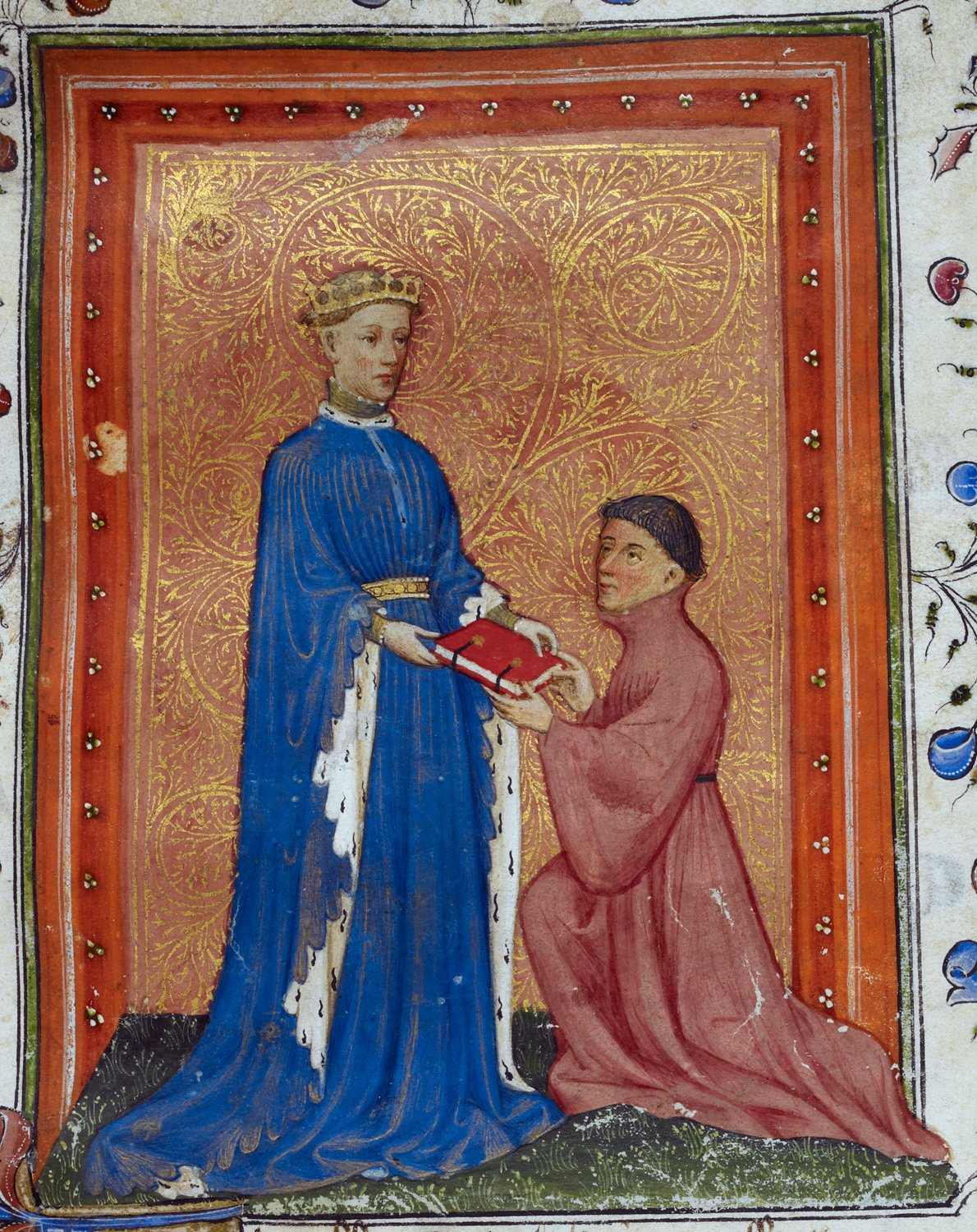
Henry, Prince of Wales, presenting Hoccleve's Regement of Princes to John de Mowbray, 2nd Duke of Norfolk

Created by Richard II of England
| # | Name | Period | Spouse | Notes | Other titles |
|---|---|---|---|---|---|
| 1 | Thomas de Mowbray (1365–1399) | 1397–1399 | Lady Elizabeth FitzAlan | Grandson of Margaret, Duchess of Norfolk; exiled by Richard II and stripped of the dukedom | Earl of Norfolk; Earl of Nottingham; Baron Mowbray; Baron Segrave |
| 2 | John de Mowbray (1392–1432) | 1425–1432 | Lady Katherine Neville | Son of the preceding; restored to the dukedom | Earl of Norfolk; Earl of Nottingham; Baron Mowbray; Baron Segrave |
| 3 | John de Mowbray (1415–1461) | 1432–1461 | Lady Eleanor Bourchier | Son of the preceding and an important figure in the Wars of the Roses | Earl of Norfolk; Earl of Nottingham; Baron Mowbray; Baron Segrave |
| 4 | John de Mowbray (1444–1476) | 1461–1476 | Lady Elizabeth Talbot | Son of the preceding; died without heirs male | Earl of Norfolk; Earl of Nottingham; Baron Mowbray; Baron Segrave |

=== Dukes (Royal) of Norfolk (1477) ===
Created by Edward IV
| # | Name | Period | Spouse | Notes | Other titles |
|---|---|---|---|---|---|
| 1 | Richard of Shrewsbury (1473–1483) | 1477–1483 | Anne de Mowbray, 8th Countess of Norfolk | Son of King Edward IV and son-in-law of the 4th Duke of Norfolk | Duke of York; Earl of Norfolk; Earl of Nottingham |

=== Dukes of Norfolk (1483) ===
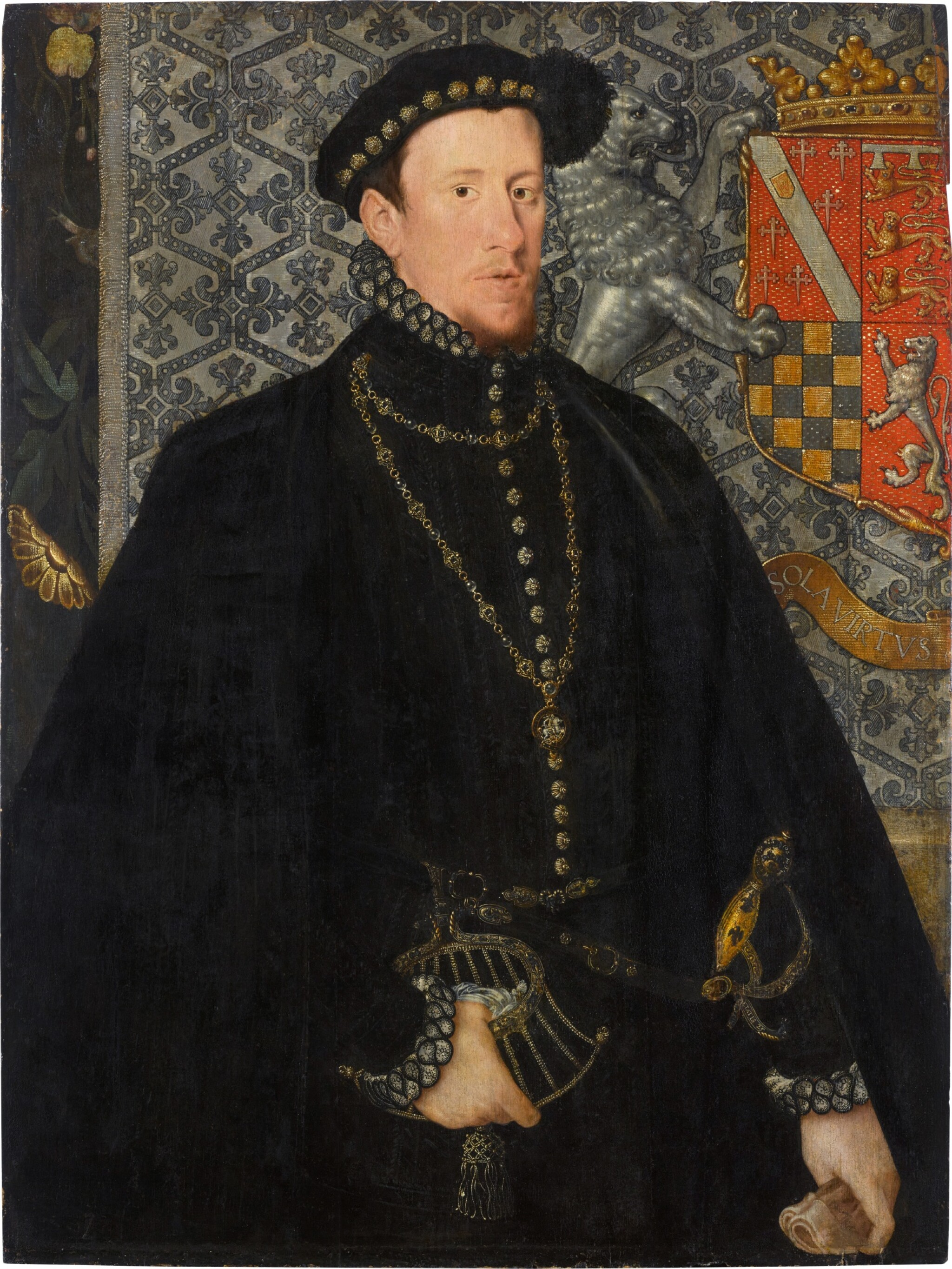
Thomas Howard, 4th Duke of Norfolk

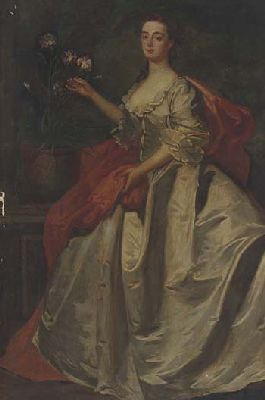
Mary (née Blount), Duchess of Norfolk, after whom Norfolk Island was named

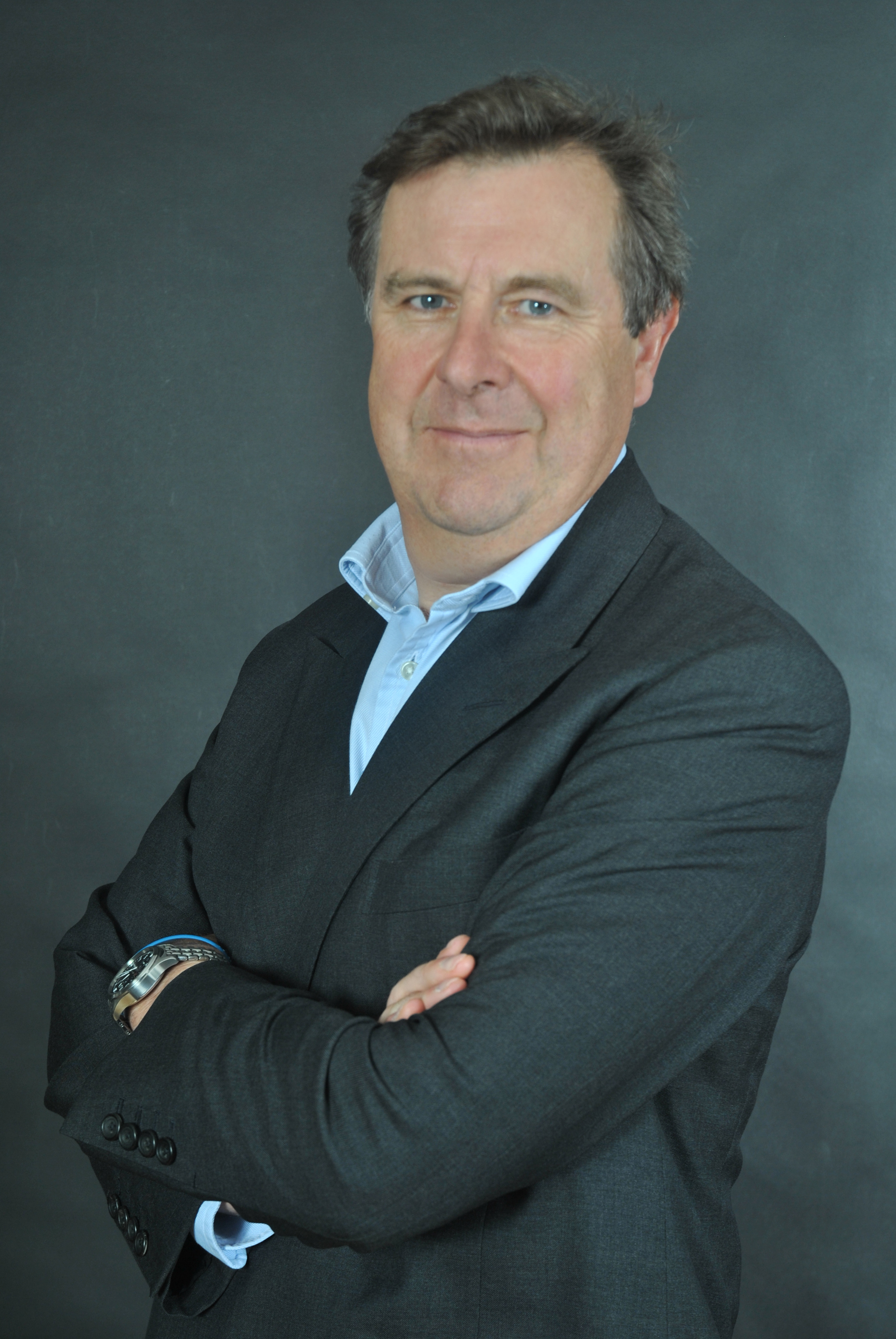
Edward Fitzalan-Howard, 18th and current Duke of Norfolk

Created by Richard III of England
| # | Name | Period | Spouse | Notes | Other titles |
|---|---|---|---|---|---|
| 1 | John Howard (c. 1425 – 1485) | 1483–1485 | widowed | Grandson of Thomas de Mowbray, 1st Duke of Norfolk, died at the Battle of Bosworth Field, forfeiting the dukedom | Baron Mowbray |
| 2 | Thomas Howard (1443–1524) | 1514–1524 | Elizabeth Tilney; Agnes Tilney | Son of the preceding, restored to the dukedom. Great-grandfather of Queen Elizabeth I | Earl of Surrey; Baron Mowbray |
| 3 | Thomas Howard (1473–1554) | 1524–1554 | Lady Elizabeth Stafford | Son of the preceding and uncle of Anne Boleyn and Catherine Howard, forfeited the dukedom having incurred Henry VIII's disfavour and restored by Mary I | Earl of Surrey; Baron Mowbray |
| 4 | Thomas Howard (1536–1572) | 1554–1572 | Lady Mary FitzAlan; Margaret Audley; Elizabeth Leyburne | Grandson of the preceding, executed for treason against Elizabeth I, forfeiting the dukedom | Earl of Surrey; Baron Mowbray |
| 5 | Thomas Howard (1627–1677) | 1660–1677 | unmarried | Great-great-grandson of the preceding, restored to the dukedom | Earl of Arundel; Earl of Surrey; Earl of Norfolk; Baron Mowbray; Baron Maltravers; Baron Furnivall |
| 6 | Henry Howard (1628–1684) | 1677–1684 | Jane Bickerton | Brother of the preceding | Earl of Arundel; Earl of Surrey; Earl of Norfolk; Earl of Norwich; Baron Mowbray; Baron Maltravers; Baron Furnivall; Baron Howard of Castle Rising |
| 7 | Henry Howard (1655–1701) | 1684–1701 | Mary Mordaunt, 7th Baroness Mordaunt | Son of the preceding Baron Mowbray by writ of acceleration on 14 Jan. 1678 | Earl of Arundel; Earl of Surrey; Earl of Norfolk; Earl of Norwich; Baron Mowbray; Baron Maltravers; Baron Furnivall; Baron Howard of Castle Rising |
| 8 | Thomas Howard (1683–1732) | 1701–1732 | Maria Shireburn | Nephew of the preceding | Earl of Arundel; Earl of Surrey; Earl of Norfolk; Earl of Norwich; Baron Mowbray; Baron Maltravers; Baron Furnivall; Baron Howard of Castle Rising |
| 9 | Edward Howard (1685–1777) | 1732–1777 | Mary Blount | Brother of the preceding | Earl of Arundel; Earl of Surrey; Earl of Norfolk; Earl of Norwich; Baron Mowbray; Baron Maltravers; Baron Furnivall; Baron Howard of Castle Rising |
| 10 | Charles Howard (1720–1786) | 1777–1786 | Catherine Brockholes | Second cousin of the preceding | Earl of Arundel; Earl of Surrey; Earl of Norfolk; Baron Maltravers |
| 11 | Charles Howard (1746–1815) | 1786–1815 | Frances Scudamore | Son of the preceding | Earl of Arundel; Earl of Surrey; Earl of Norfolk; Baron Maltravers |
| 12 | Bernard Edward Howard (1765–1842) | 1815–1842 | divorced | Third cousin of the preceding | Earl of Arundel; Earl of Surrey; Earl of Norfolk; Baron Maltravers |
| 13 | Henry Charles Howard (1791–1856) | 1842–1856 | Charlotte Leveson-Gower | Son of the preceding | Earl of Arundel; Earl of Surrey; Earl of Norfolk; Baron Maltravers |
| 14 | Henry Granville Fitzalan-Howard (1815–1860) | 1856–1860 | Augusta Lyons | Son of the preceding | Earl of Arundel; Earl of Surrey; Earl of Norfolk; Baron Maltravers |
| 15 | Henry Fitzalan-Howard (1847–1917) | 1860–1917 | Lady Flora Paulyna Hetty Barbara Abney-Hastings; Gwendolen Constable-Maxwell, 12th Lady Herries of Terregles | Son of the preceding | Earl of Arundel; Earl of Surrey; Earl of Norfolk; Baron Maltravers |
| 16 | Bernard Marmaduke Fitzalan-Howard (1908–1975) | 1917–1975 | Lavinia Strutt | Son of the preceding | Earl of Arundel; Earl of Surrey; Earl of Norfolk; Baron Maltravers; Lord Herries of Terregles |
| 17 | Miles Francis Stapleton Fitzalan-Howard (1915–2002) | 1975–2002 | Anne Constable-Maxwell | Second cousin once removed of the preceding | Earl of Arundel; Earl of Surrey; Earl of Norfolk; Baron Maltravers; Baron Beaumont; Baron Howard of Glossop |
| 18 | Edward William Fitzalan-Howard (b. 1956) | since 2002 | Georgina Gore (m. 1987; div. 2022) Francesca Herbert (m. 2022) | Son of the preceding | Earl of Arundel; Earl of Surrey; Earl of Norfolk; Baron Maltravers; Baron Beaumont; Baron Howard of Glossop |

The heir apparent is the Duke's eldest son, Henry Miles Fitzalan-Howard, styled Earl of Arundel (b. 1987).

== Remainder ==
In 1660, the 23rd Earl of Arundel was restored to the Dukedom of Norfolk with remainder to:

1. the heirs male of his body (he never married)
2. the heirs male of his father Henry Howard, the 22nd Earl
  1. Hon. Henry Howard (extinct in 1777)
  2. Hon. Philip Howard (extinct in 1694)
  3. Hon. Charles Howard (extinct in 1815)
  4. Hon. Talbot Howard
  5. Hon. Edward Howard
  6. Hon. Francis Howard
  7. Hon. Bernard Howard (the present line)
  8. Hon. Esme Howard (extinct in 1728)
  9. Hon. John Howard (extinct in 1711)
3. the heirs male of his grandfather Thomas Howard, 21st Earl
  1. Henry Howard, the 22nd Earl
  2. William Howard, 1st Viscount Stafford (extinct in 1762)
4. the heirs male of his great-grandfather Philip Howard, 20th Earl, eldest son of the fourth Duke (he had none apart from the 21st Earl)
  1. Thomas Howard, 21st Earl
5. the heirs male in the line of descent from Thomas Howard, younger half-brother of Philip Howard, 20th Earl
  1. Theophilus Howard, 2nd Earl of Suffolk (extinct in 1745)
  2. Thomas Howard, 1st Earl of Berkshire (currently extant)
  3. Hon. Henry Howard (extinct in 1616)
  4. Hon. Sir Charles Howard (extinct in 1626)
  5. Hon. Sir Robert Howard (extinct in 1653)
  6. Hon. Sir William Howard
  7. Edward Howard, 1st Baron Howard of Escrick (extinct in 1715)
6. the heirs male descended from Lord William Howard, younger half-brother of Philip Howard, 20th Earl: (both lines currently extant)
  1. the heirs male in the senior line of descent from Lord William Howard through his elder son Sir Philip Howard, grandfather of the first Earl of Carlisle
  2. the heirs male in the junior line of descent from Lord William Howard through his second son Francis, ancestor of the Howards of Corby Castle, Cumberland, England (the elder line of his descendants holding Corby died out and the castle passed through female-line to Lawson, later Howard-Lawson baronets, of Brough Hall; younger line of Francis Howards' male-line descendants is extant).

In the event all the currently extant lines of descent from the fourth Duke fail in the male line, the Dukedom of Norfolk and its subsidiary titles will become extinct; though there exists a currently extant branch of the Howard dynasty, the Earls of Effingham, in descent from the second Duke, their line was unaccountably omitted from the 1660 remainder.

== Succession to the Dukedom ==
Line of succession (simplified)
- Thomas Howard, 4th Duke of Norfolk (1536–executed 1572, when the dukedom was forfeited)
  - Saint Philip Howard, 13th Earl of Arundel (1557–1595)
    - Thomas Howard, 14th Earl of Arundel (1585–1646)
      - Henry Howard, 15th Earl of Arundel (1608–1652)
        - Thomas Howard, 5th Duke of Norfolk (1627–1677, succeeded as Earl of Arundel 1652, restored to Dukedom of Norfolk 1660 with the above remainder)
        - Henry Howard, 6th Duke of Norfolk (1628–1684)
          - Henry Howard, 7th Duke of Norfolk (1655–1701)
          - Lord Thomas Howard (1662–1689)
            - Thomas Howard, 8th Duke of Norfolk (1683–1732)
            - Edward Howard, 9th Duke of Norfolk (1686–1777)
        - Hon. Charles Howard (1630–1713)
          - Henry Charles Howard (d. 1720)
            - Charles Howard, 10th Duke of Norfolk (1720–1786)
              - Charles Howard, 11th Duke of Norfolk (1746–1815)
        - Hon. Bernard Howard (1641–1717)
          - Bernard Howard (1674–1735)
            - Henry Howard (1713–1787)
              - Bernard Howard, 12th Duke of Norfolk (1765–1842)
                - Henry Howard, 13th Duke of Norfolk (1791–1856)
                  - Henry Fitzalan-Howard, 14th Duke of Norfolk (1815–1860)
                    - Henry Fitzalan-Howard, 15th Duke of Norfolk (1847–1917)
                      - Bernard Fitzalan-Howard, 16th Duke of Norfolk (1908–1975)
                  - Edward Fitzalan-Howard, 1st Baron Howard of Glossop (1818–1883)
                    - Francis Fitzalan-Howard, 2nd Baron Howard of Glossop (1859–1924)
                      - Bernard Fitzalan-Howard, 3rd Baron Howard of Glossop (1885–1972)
                        - Miles Stapleton-Fitzalan-Howard, 17th Duke of Norfolk (1915–2002)
                          - Edward Fitzalan-Howard, 18th Duke of Norfolk (b. 1956)
                            - (1). Henry Fitzalan-Howard, Earl of Arundel (b. 1987)
                            - (2). Lord Thomas Jack Fitzalan-Howard (b. 1992)
                            - (3). Lord Philip Fitzalan-Howard (b. 1996)
                          - (4). Lord Gerald Bernard Fitzalan-Howard (b. 1962)
                            - (5). Arthur Stapleton Desmond Fitzalan-Howard (b. 1991)
                        - Lord Michael Fitzalan-Howard (1916–2007)
                          - male issue in line
                        - Lord Martin Fitzalan-Howard (1922–2003)
                          - male issue in line
                        - other male issue in line
                - Edward Charles Howard (1774–1816)
                  - Edward Gyles Howard (1805–1840)
                    - Edward Henry Howard (1829–1892) cardinal
              - Lord Henry Howard-Molyneux-Howard (1766–1824)
                - Henry Howard (1802–1875)
                  - Stafford Howard (1851–1916)
                    - Stafford Vaughan Stepney Howard (1915–1991)
                      - Nicholas Stafford Howard (1937–2008)
                        - male issue in line
                      - other male issue in line
                  - Robert Mowbray Howard (1854–1928)
                    - Henry Ralph Mowbray Howard-Sneyd (1883–1950)
                      - Thomas Henry Gavin Howard-Sneyd (1940–2010)
                        - male issue in line
                  - Esmé Howard, 1st Baron Howard of Penrith (1863–1939)
                    - Barons Howard of Penrith
  - Thomas Howard, 1st Earl of Suffolk (1561–1626)
    - Thomas Howard, 1st Earl of Berkshire (1587–1669)
      - Philip Howard (1629–1717)
        - Charles Howard (1681–1707)
          - Philip Howard (1704–1741)
            - John Howard, 15th Earl of Suffolk, 8th Earl of Berkshire (1739–1820)
              - Earls of Suffolk and Berkshire
  - Lord William Howard (1563–1640)
    - Philip Howard (b. 1581)
      - William Howard
        - Charles Howard, 1st Earl of Carlisle (1628–1685)
          - Earls of Carlisle
    - Francis Howard (1588–1660)
      - William Howard (d. 1708)
        - Thomas Howard (d. 1740)
          - Philip Howard (1730–1810)
            - Henry Howard (1757–1842)
              - Henry Francis Howard (1809–1898)
                - Henry Howard (1843–1921)
                  - George Howard (1869–1919)
                    - Henry Howard (1907–1955)
                      - male issue in line
                  - Henry Mowbray Howard (1873–1953)
                    - Henry Edmund Howard (1923–1999)
                      - male issue in line

== Knights of the Garter ==
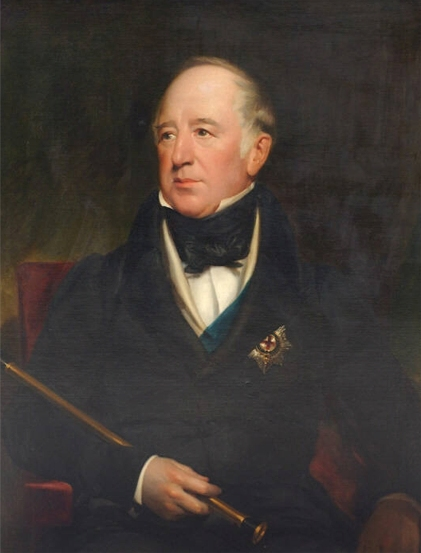
12th Duke of Norfolk shown wearing the star and sash of the Order of the Garter

The following list is of the dukes of Norfolk, along with their year of investiture, who were also knights of the Order of the Garter across all creations of the title.

- 1383 – Thomas Mowbray, 1st Duke of Norfolk
- 1421 – John Mowbray, 3rd Duke of Norfolk
- 1451 – John Mowbray, 4th Duke of Norfolk
- 1472 – John Howard, 1st Duke of Norfolk
- 1475 – Richard of Shrewsbury, 1st Duke of York, 1st Duke of Norfolk
- 1483 – Thomas Howard, 1st Earl of Surrey; degraded 1485; restored 1489; later 2nd Duke of Norfolk
- 1510 – Thomas Howard, 3rd Duke of Norfolk
- 1559 – Thomas Howard, 4th Duke of Norfolk; degraded 1572
- 1685 – Henry Howard, 7th Duke of Norfolk
- 1834 – Bernard Edward Howard, 12th Duke of Norfolk
- 1848 – Henry Howard, 13th Duke of Norfolk
- 1886 – Henry Fitzalan-Howard, 15th Duke of Norfolk
- 1937 – Bernard Marmaduke Fitzalan-Howard, 16th Duke of Norfolk
- 1983 – Miles Francis Stapleton Fitzalan-Howard, 17th Duke of Norfolk

== Family trees ==
Family tree of the Dukes of Norfolk and Suke of Surrey; Earls of Arundel, East Anglia, Norfolk, Norwich, Nottingham, and Surrey; and Barons Mowbray, Segrave and Stourton

Earl of East Anglia (Earls of Norfolk and Suffolk) (1st creation), a. 1069
Ralph the Staller c. 1011–1068; 1st Earl of Norfolk and Suffolk, or of the East Angles (Earl c. 1066/67 – 1068)
Earl of Surrey (1st creation), c. 1088
Ralph de Gael a. 1040–1100; 2nd Earl of Norfolk and Suffolk, or of the East Angles (Earl 1068–1074) | Roger Bigod (Bigot) d. 1107; Sheriff of Norfolk and Suffolk | William de Warenne c. 1035–1088; 1st Earl (of) Warenne / Earl of Surrey, Lord of Lewes, Seigneur de Varennes
Earldom forfeit, 1074
Earl of Norfolk (2nd creation), 1141
King Henry I c. 1068–1135 | Maud Bigod | William Bigod d. 1120 | Hugh Bigod; 1095–1177; 1st Earl of Norfolk (Earl 1141–1177) | William de Warenne d. 1138; 2nd Earl (of) Warenne / Earl of Surrey
Earl of Arundel, Earl of Sussex (1st creations), c. 1138
Empress Matilda c. 1102–1167 | Geoffrey Plantagenet; 1113–1251; Count of Anjou | Adeliza of Louvain c. 1103–1151 | William d'Aubigny c. 1109–1176; 1st Earl of Arundel (Sussex), Earl of Lincoln | William de Warenne; 1119–1148; 3rd Earl of Surrey
King Henry II; 1133–1189 | William d'Aubigny b. c. 1138/1150–1176; 2nd Earl of Arundel (Sussex) | Roger Bigod c. 1144/1150–1221; 2nd Earl of Norfolk (Earl 1189–1221, disputed 1177–1189) | William of Blois c. 1137–1159 | Isabel de Warenne c. 1130 – 1203; 4th Countess of Surrey suo jure | Hamelin de Warenne c. 1130–1202; Comte de Warenne / Earl of Surrey, jure uxoris
King John; 1166/1167–1216 | William d'Aubigny a. 1180–1221; 3rd Earl of Arundel (Sussex) | Hugh Bigod; 1186–1225; 3rd Earl of Norfolk (Earl 1221–1225) | Maud Marshal; 1192–1248 | William de Warenne c. 1160s/1170s–1240 5th Earl of Surrey
William d'Aubigny c. 1203–a. 1124; 4th Earl of Arundel (Sussex) | Hugh d'Aubigny d. 1243; 5th Earl of Arundel (Sussex) | Isabel d'Aubigny | John Fitzalan; 1200–1240; Lord of Clun and Oswestry | Roger Bigod c. 1209–1270; 4th Earl of Norfolk (Earl 1233–1270) | Hugh Bigod c. 1211–1266
Earl of Sussex (1st creation), 1282
King Henry III; 1207–1272 | John Fitzalan; 1223–1267; 6th Earl of Arundel (Sussex), jure matris | John de Warenne; 1231–1304; 1st Earl of Sussex (Earl of Sussex 1282–1304), 6th Earl of Surrey (Earl of Surrey 1240–1304)
Baron Segrave of Se(a)grave, 1283
Nicholas Segrave c. 1238–a. 1295; 1st Baron Segrave | King Edward I 1239–1307 | Edmund Crouchback; 1245–1296; Earl of Lancaster | John Fitzalan; 1246–1272; 7th Earl of Arundel (Sussex), jure matris | Roger Bigod c. 1245–1306; 5th Earl of Norfolk (Earl 1270–1306)
Earldom extinct, 1270
Baron Mowbray, 1283 | Earl of Arundel (2nd (1st by writ) creation), 1289
John Segrave c. 1256–1325; 2nd Baron Segrave | Roger de Mowbray; 1254–1297; 1st Baron Mowbray | Richard Fitzalan; 1267–1302; 1st (or 6th) Earl of Arundel | William de Warenne; 1256–1286
Earl of Norfolk (3rd creation), 1312
Stephen Segrave d. 1325; 3rd Baron Segrave | Thomas of Brotherton; 1300–1338; 1st Earl of Norfolk (Earl 1312–1338) | John Mowbray; 1286–1322; 2nd Baron Mowbray | Henry c. 1281–1345; Earl of Leicester, Earl of Lancaster | Edmund Fitzalan; 1286–1326; 2nd (or 7th) Earl of Arundel | Alice de Warenne; 1287–1388 heir apparent to the Earldom of Surrey | John de Warenne; 1286–1347; 7th Earl of Surrey, 2nd Earl of Sussex
Earldom of Arundel (2nd creation) forfeit, 1326 | Earldom of Sussex extinct(?), 1347
Earldom of Arundel (2nd creation) restored, 1331
John Segrave; 1315–1353; 4th Baron Segrave | Margaret of Brotherton; 1320–1399; Duchess of Norfolk "for life" (Duchess 1397–1399), 2nd Countess of Norfolk (Countess 1338–1399), | John Mowbray; 1310–1361; 3rd Baron Mowbray | Joan of Lancaster c. 1312–1349 | Eleanor of Lancaster; 1318–1372 | Richard FitzAlan c. 1313–1376; 3rd (or 8th) Earl of Arundel (Earl of Arundel 1331–1376), 8th Earl of Surrey (Earl of Surrey 1347–1376)
Baron Arundel, 1377
Elizabeth de Segrave; 1338–1368; 5th Baroness Segrave | John de Mowbray; 1340–1368; 4th Baron Mowbray | Richard FitzAlan; 1346–1397; 4th (or 9th) Earl of Arundel, 9th Earl of Surrey | John FitzAlan c. 1348–1379; 1st Baron Arundel | Alice FitzAlan
Earldom of Arundel (2nd creation) forfeit, 1397
Earl of Nottingham (1st creation), 1377 | Earl of Nottingham (2nd creation), 1383; Duke of Norfolk (1st creation), 1397 | Duke of Surrey, 1397
John de Mowbray; 1365–1383; Earl of Nottingham (Earl 1377–1383), 6th Baron Segrave, 5th Baron Mowbray (Baron 1368–1383) | Thomas de Mowbray; 1366–1399; 1st Duke of Norfolk, etc. (Duke 1397–1399), 3rd Earl of Norfolk (Earl 1399), 7th Baron Segrave, 6th Baron Mowbray (Baron 1377–1399) | Elizabeth Fitzalan; 1366–1425 | John FitzAlan; 1364–1390; 2nd Baron Arundel | Thomas Holland; 1372–1400; Duke of Surrey, Earl of Kent, Baron Holland
Earldom of Nottingham extinct, 1383 | Titles forfeit, 1399 | Dukedom of Surrey renounced, 1400
Baron Stourton, 1448 | Duke of Norfolk (1st creation restored), 1425 | Earldom of Arundel (2nd creation) restored, 1400
John Stourton; 1400–1462; 1st Baron Stourton (Baron 1448–1462) | Thomas de Mowbray; 1385–1405; 4th Earl of Norfolk, 8th Baron Segrave, 7th Baron Mowbray (Earl 1399–1405) | John de Mowbray; 1392–1432; 2nd Duke of Norfolk (Duke 1425–1432), 5th Earl of Norfolk, 9th Baron Segrave, 8th Baron Mowbray (Earl 1405–1432) | Margaret de Mowbray c. 1388–1459 | Robert Howard; 1385–1436 | Isabel de Mowbray c. 1400–1452 | Thomas FitzAlan; 1381–1415; 5th (or 10th) Earl of Arundel, 10th Earl of Surrey | John Fitzalan; 1385–1421; 6th (or 11th) Earl of Arundel, 3rd Baron Arundel, 3rd Baron Maltravers
Duke of Norfolk (4th creation), 1483
William Stourton a. 1426–1478; 2nd Baron Stourton (Baron 1462–1478) | John de Mowbray; 1415–1461; 3rd Duke of Norfolk, 6th Earl of Norfolk, 10th Baron Segrave, 9th Baron Mowbray (Duke 1432–1461) | John Howard; 1425–1485; 1st Duke of Norfolk, 13th Baron Segrave, 12th Baron Mowbray (Duke 1483–1485) | John Fitzalan; 1408–1435; 7th (or 12th) Earl of Arundel, 4th Baron Arundel, 4th Baron Maltravers | William Fitzalan; 1417–1487; 9th (or 14th) Earl of Arundel, 6th Baron Arundel, 6th Baron Maltravers
Titles forfeit, 1485
Earl of Surrey (2nd creation), 1451 | Duke of Norfolk (4th creation) restored and Earl of Surrey, 1514
John Stourton c. 1454–1485; 3rd Baron Stourton (Baron 1479–1485) | William Stourton c. 1457–1524; 5th Baron Stourton (Baron 1487–1524) | John de Mowbray; 1444–1476; 4th Duke of Norfolk, 7th Earl of Norfolk, 11th Baron Segrave, 10th Baron Mowbray (Duke 1461–1476), Earl of Surrey (Earl 1451–1476) | King Edward IV; 1442–1483 | Thomas Howard; 1443–1524; 2nd Duke of Norfolk, 1st Earl of Surrey (Duke 1514–1524) | Humfrey Fitzalan; 1429–1438; 8th (or 13th) Earl of Arundel, 5th Baron Arundel, 5th Baron Maltravers | Thomas Fitzalan; 1450–1524; 10th (or 15th) Earl of Arundel, 7th Baron Arundel, 7th Baron Maltravers
Dukedom of Norfolk, Earldom of Nottingham, Earldom of Surrey extinct, 1476
Duke of Norfolk (3rd creation), Earl of Nottingham (3rd creation), and Earl of Surrey, 1477
Francis Stourton; 1485–1487; 4th Baron Stourton (Baron 1485–1487) | Edward Stourton; 1463–1535; 6th Baron Stourton (Baron 1524–1535) | Anne de Mowbray; 1472–1481; 8th Countess of Norfolk, 12th Baroness Segrave, 11th Baroness Mowbray (Countess 1476–1481) | Richard of Shrewsbury; 1473–1483; Duke of York, Duke of Norfolk, Earl of Nottingham, Earl of Warenne (Duke 1477–1483) | Anne of York; 1475–1511 | Thomas Howard; 1473–1554; 3rd Duke of Norfolk, 2nd Earl of Surrey (Duke 1524–1554) | Edmund Howard c. 1478–1539 | Elizabeth Boleyn c. 1480–1538 | William Fitzalan; 1476–1544; 11th (or 16th) Earl of Arundel, 8th Baron Arundel, 8th Baron Maltravers
Earldom of Norfolk extinct and Baronies Segrave and Mowbray in abeyance, 1481 | Dukedom of Norfolk, Earldom of Nottingham, Earldom of Surrey extinct, 1483 | Attainted, 1547; Restored, 1553
William Stourton c. 1505–1548; 7th Baron Stourton | Earl of Nottingham (5th creation), 1525 | King Henry VIII; 1491–1547 | Anne Boleyn c. 1501 or 1507–1536
Viscount Howard of Bindon, 1559
Charles Stourton c. 1520–1557; 8th Baron Stourton | Henry Howard; 1517–1547 styled Earl of Surrey | Thomas Howard c. 1520–1582; 1st Viscount Howard of Bindon | Mary FitzRoy; 1519–1557 | Henry FitzRoy; 1519–1536; Duke of Richmond and Somerset, Earl of Nottingham | Catherine Howard c. 1524–1542 | Henry Fitzalan; 1512–1580; 12th (or 17th) Earl of Arundel, 9th Baron Arundel, 9th Baron Maltravers
Earldom of Nottingham extinct, 1536
Thomas Howard; 1536–1572; 4th Duke of Norfolk, 3rd Earl of Surrey, 13th Baron Mowbray (Duke 1554–1572) | Henry Howard; 1540–1614; Earl of Northampton | Queen Elizabeth I 1533–1603 | Mary FitzAlan; 1540–1557
Dukedom (3rd creation) forfeit, 1572
Earl of Arundel (3rd creation), 1580 | Earl of Suffolk (4th creation), 1603
John Stourton; 1553–1588; 9th Baron Stourton | Edward Stourton c. 1555–1633; 10th Baron Stourton | Philip Howard; 1557–1595; 20th/13th/1st Earl of Arundel, styled Earl of Surrey | Thomas Howard; 1561–1626; Earl of Suffolk | Lord William Howard; 1563–1640
Earldom of Arundel and Barony of Mowbray attainted, 1589 | see Earls, Marquesses, and Dukes of Suffolk family tree
Earl of Arundel (3rd creation) and Barony of Mowbray restored, 1604; Earl of Norfolk (5th creation), 1644
William Stourton c. 1594–1672; 11th Baron Stourton | Thomas Howard; 1585–1646; 21st/14th/2nd Earl of Arundel, 2nd/4th Earl of Surrey, 1st Earl of Norfolk, 14th Baron Mowbray (Earl 1644–1646) | Philip
see Earls of Shrewsbury family tree
Edward Stourton; 1617–1644 | Alethea Talbot; 1585–1654; 17th Baroness Strange of Blackmere, 14th Baroness Talbot, 13th Baroness Furnivall | Henry Frederick Howard; 1608–1652; 22nd/15th/3rd Earl of Arundel, 3rd/5th Earl of Surrey, 2nd Earl of Norfolk, 15th Baron Mowbray (Earl 1646–1652) | William Howard; 1614–1680; Viscount Stafford | William
Duke of Norfolk (4th creation restored), 1660 | Baron Howard of Castle Rising, 1669; Earl of Norwich (3rd creation), 1672
William Stourton d. 1685; 12th Baron Stourton | Thomas Howard; 1627–1677; 5th Duke of Norfolk, 21st/14th/2nd Earl of Arundel, 4th/6th Earl of Surrey, 16th Baron Mowbray (Duke 1660–1677) 18th Baron Strange of Blackmere, 15th Baron Talbot, 14th Baron Furnivall (Baron 1654–1677) | Henry Howard; 1628–1684; 6th Duke of Norfolk, 22nd/15th/3rd Earl of Arundel, 5th/7th Earl of Surrey; 18th Baron Strange of Blackmere, 17th Baron Mowbray, 15th Baron Talbot, 14th Baron Furnivall (Duke 1677–1684) 1st Earl of Norwich, etc. (Earl 1672–1684) | Charles Howard; 1630–1713 | Col. Bernard Howard; 1641–1717 | Charles Howard; 1628–1685; Earl of Carlisle
Edward Stourton; 1665–1720; 13th Baron Stourton | Thomas Stourton; 1667–1744; 14th Baron Stourton | Charles Stourton; 1669–1739 | Henry Howard; 1655–1701; 7th Duke of Norfolk, 22nd/15th/3rd Earl of Arundel, 5th/7th Earl of Surrey, 2nd Earl of Norwich, etc. 18th Baron Mowbray, 19th Baron Strange of Blackmere, 15th Baron Talbot, 14th Baron Furnivall (Duke 1684–1701) | Lord Thomas Howard; 1662–1689 | Henry Charles Howard d. 1720
Thomas Howard; 1683–1732; 8th Duke of Norfolk, 23rd/16th/4th Earl of Arundel, 6th/8th Earl of Surrey, 3rd Earl of Norwich, etc. 18th Baron Strange of Blackmere, 15th Baron Talbot, 14th Baron Furnivall, 19th Baron Mowbray (Duke 1701–1732) | Edward Howard; 1685–1777; 9th Duke of Norfolk, 24th/17th/5th Earl of Arundel, 7th/9th Earl of Surrey, 4th Earl of Norwich, etc. 20th Baron Mowbray, 20th Baron Strange of Blackmere, 15th Baron Talbot, 14th Baron Furnivall (Duke 1732–1777) | Philip Howard; 1688–1750 | Bernard Howard; 1674–1735
Earldom of Norwich (3rd creation) and Barony of Howard of Castle Rising extinct and Baronies of Furnivall, Mowbray, Segrave, Strange of Blackmere, and Talbot abeyant, 1777
Charles Stourton; 1702–1753; 15th Baron Stourton | William Stourton; 1704–1781; 16th Baron Stourton | Winifred Howard; 1726–1753 | Anne Howard; 1742–1787 | Charles Howard; 1720–1786; 10th Duke of Norfolk, 25th/18th/6th Earl of Arundel, 8th/10th Earl of Surrey (Duke 1777–1786) | Henry Howard; 1713–1787
Charles Philip Stourton; 1752–1816; 17th Baron Stourton | Charles Howard; 1746–1815; 11th Duke of Norfolk, 26th/19th/7th Earl of Arundel, 9th/11th Earl of Surrey (Duke 1786–1815)
William Stourton; 1776–1846; 18th Baron Stourton | Bernard Howard; 1765–1842; 12th Duke of Norfolk, 27th/20th/8th Earl of Arundel, 10th/12th Earl of Surrey (Duke 1815–1842) | Henry Howard-Molyneux-Howard; 1766–1824
Charles Stourton; 1802–1872; 19th Baron Stourton | Henry Howard; 1791–1856; 13th Duke of Norfolk, 28th/21st/9th Earl of Arundel, 11th/13th Earl of Surrey (Duke 1842–1856) | Henry Howard-Molyneux-Howard; 1802–1875
Baron Mowbray and Baron Segrave abeayance restored, 1878 | Baron Howard of Glossop, 1869
Alfred Joseph Stourton; 1829–1893; 24th Baron Segrave, 21st/23rd Baron Mowbray, 20th Baron Stourton | Henry Granville Fitzalan-Howard; 1815–1860; 14th Duke of Norfolk, 29th/22nd/10th Earl of Arundel, 12th/14th Earl of Surrey (Duke 1856–1860) | Edward George Fitzalan-Howard; 1818–1883; 1st Baron Howard of Glossop
Baron Howard of Penrith, 1830
Charles Botolph Joseph Stourton; 1867–1936; 25th Baron Segrave, 22nd/24th Baron Mowbray, 21st Baron Stourton | Henry Fitzalan-Howard; 1847–1917; 15th Duke of Norfolk, 30th/23rd/11th Earl of Arundel, 13th/15th Earl of Surrey, Lord Maltravers, Earl of Arundel and Surrey (Duke 1860–1917) | Francis Fitzalan-Howard; 1859–1924; 2nd Baron Howard of Glossop | Esmé Howard; 1863–1939; 1st Baron Howard of Penrith
William Marmaduke Stourton; 1895–1965; 26th Baron Segrave, 23rd/25th Baron Mowbray, 22nd Baron Stourton | Bernard Fitzalan-Howard; 1908–1975; 16th Duke of Norfolk, 31st/24th/12th Earl of Arundel, 14th/16th Earl of Surrey (Duke 1917–1975) | Bernard Edward Fitzalan-Howard; 1885–1972; 3rd Baron Howard of Glossop | Francis Howard; 1905–1999; 2nd Baron Howard of Penrith
Charles Edward Stourton; 1923–2006; 27th Baron Segrave, 24th/26th Baron Mowbray, 23rd Baron Stourton | Miles Fitzalan-Howard; 1915–2002; 17th Duke of Norfolk, 32nd/25th/13th Earl of Arundel, 15th/17th Earl of Surrey, 4th Baron Howard of Glossop (Duke 1975–2002) m. Mary Teresa Constable-Maxwell
Edward William Stephen Stourton; 1953–2021; 28th Baron Segrave, 25th/27th Baron Mowbray, 24th Baron Stourton | Marsha Howard b. 1953 | Edward Fitzalan-Howard b. 1956; 18th Duke of Norfolk, 33rd/26th/14th Earl of Arundel, 16th/18th Earl of Surrey, 5th Baron Howard of Glossop (from 2002) m. Georgina Susan Gore | Philip Esmé Howard b. 1945; 3rd Baron Howard of Penrith
Sarah Louise Stourton b. 1982 | Isabella Laura Stourton b. 1983 | Camilla Charlotte Stourton b. 1987 | Francesca Jane Stourton b. 1988 | James Charles Peter Stourton b. 1991; 29th Baron Segrave, 26th/28th Baron Mowbray, 25th Baron Stourton | Henry Fitzalan-Howard b. 1987 styled Earl of Arundel and Surrey | Thomas Philip Howard b. 1974
Co-heir presumptive to the Baronies Segrave, Mowbray, and Stourton | Co-heir presumptive to the Baronies Segrave, Mowbray, and Stourton | Co-heir presumptive to the Baronies Segrave, Mowbray, and Stourton | Co-heir presumptive to the Baronies Segrave, Mowbray, and Stourton | Heir apparent to the dukedom | Heir apparent to the Barony Howard of Penrith

Family tree of British royal dukes

Includes dukes of: Albany, Albemarle, Bedford, Cambridge, Clarence, Connaught and Strathearn, Cumberland, Edinburgh, Gloucester, Gloucester and Edinburgh, Hereford, Kent, Kintyre and Lorne, Norfolk, Ross, Somerset, Sussex, Windsor, and York, but only when royally.

Non-royal dukes are not included; see Royal dukedoms in the United Kingdom.
Also not included are titles mandated for use by the heir apparent (Duke of Rothesay and the 1337 creation of the Duke of Cornwall), see Princes of Wales family tree.

King Robert II; 1316–1390 | King Edward III; 1312–1377
Duke of Albany (1st creation), 1398 | Duke of Clarence (1st creation), 1362 | Duke of York (1st creation), 1385
King Robert III c. 1337–1406 | Robert Stewart c. 1340–1420; 1st Duke of Albany | Edward the Black Prince; 1330–1376 | Lionel of Antwerp; 1338–1368; Duke of Clarence | John of Gaunt; 1340–1399 | Edmund; 1341–1402; 1st Duke of York
Dukedom of Clarence (1st creation) extinct, 1368
Duke of Cornwall (2nd creation), 1376 | Duke of Hereford, 1397 | Duke of Gloucester (1st creation), 1385
Murdoch Stewart c. 1362–1425; 2nd Duke of Albany | Richard of Bordeaux; 1367–1400; Duke of Cornwall, later King Richard II | Henry Bolingbroke; 1367–1413; Duke of Hereford, later King Henry IV | Thomas of Woodstock; 1355–1397; Duke of Gloucester
Dukedom of Albany (1st creation) forfeit, 1425 | Dukedom of Cornwall (2nd creation) merged in the crown, 1377 | Dukedom of Hereford merged in the crown, 1399 | Dukedom of Gloucester (1st creation) extinct, 1397
Duke of Clarence (2nd creation), 1412 | Duke of Bedford (1st & 2nd creations), 1414 | Duke of Gloucester (2nd creation), 1414 | Duke of Albemarle (Aumale) (1st creation), 1397
Thomas of Lancaster; 1387–1421; Duke of Clarence | John of Lancaster; 1389–1435; Duke of Bedford; Surrendered dukedom and then regranted, 1433 | Humphrey of Lancaster; 1390–1447; Duke of Gloucester | John Beaufort; 1373–1410 | Joan Beaufort c. 1379–1440 | Edward of Norwich c. 1373–1415; Duke of Aumale, 2nd Duke of York | Richard of Conisburgh; 1385–1415
Dukedom of Clarence (2nd creation) extinct, 1421 | Dukedom of Bedford (2nd creation) extinct, 1435 | Dukedom of Gloucester (2nd creation) extinct, 1447 | Dukedom of Albemarle (Aumale) (1st creation) forfeit, 1399
Duke of York (1st creation) restored, 1425; Duke of Cornwall (3rd creation), 1460
King James I 1394–1437 | Joan Beaufort c. 1404–1445 | Owen Tudor c. 1400–1461 | John Beaufort; 1404–1444 | Richard Neville; 1400–1460 | Cecily Neville; 1415–1495 | Richard of York; 1411–1460; 3rd Duke of York, Duke of Cornwall
Duke of Cornwall (3rd creation) extinct, 1460
Duke of Bedford (5th creation), 1485 | Duke of Clarence (3rd creation), 1461 | Duke of Gloucester (3rd creation), 1461
King James II; 1430–1460 | Jasper Tudor c. 1431–1495; Duke of Bedford | Edmund Tudor c. 1430–1456 | Lady Margaret Beaufort; 1443–1509 | John Neville c. 1431–1471 | Elizabeth Woodville c. 1437–1492 | Edward; 1442–1483; 4th Duke of York, later King Edward IV | George Plantagenet; 1449–1478; Duke of Clarence | Richard of York; 1452–1485; Duke of Gloucester, later King Richard III
Dukedom of Bedford (5th creation) extinct, 1495 | Dukedom of York (1st creation) merged in the Crown, 1461 | Dukedom of Clarence (3rd creation) forfeit, 1478 | Dukedom of Gloucester (3rd creation) merged in the Crown, 1483
Duke of Albany (2nd creation), 1458 | Duke of Bedford (3rd creation), 1470 | Duke of York (2nd creation), 1474; Duke of Norfolk (3rd creation), 1477 | Duke of Bedford (4th creation), 1478
Alexander Stewart c. 1454–1485; 1st Duke of Albany | King James III; 1451/1452–1488 | George Neville; 1457–1483; Duke of Bedford | King Henry VII; 1457–1509 | Elizabeth of York; 1466–1503 | Richard of Shrewsbury; 1473–1483; Duke of York, Duke of Norfolk | George of York; 1477–1479; Duke of Bedford
Dukedom of Bedford (3rd creation) forfeit, 1478 | Dukedom of York (2nd creation) and Dukedom of Norfolk (3rd creation) extinct, 1483 | Dukedom of Bedford (4th creation) extinct, 1479
Duke of Ross (1st creation), 1488 | Duke of York (3rd creation), 1494 | Duke of Somerset (3rd creation), 1499
John Stewart; 1482–1536; 2nd Duke of Albany | James Stewart; 1476–1504; Duke of Ross | King James IV; 1473–1513 | Margaret Tudor; 1489–1541 | Henry; 1491–1547; Duke of York, later King Henry VIII | Edmund Tudor; 1499–1500; Duke of Somerset (nominated but probably not invested)
Dukedom of Albany (2nd creation) extinct, 1536 | Dukedom of Ross (1st creation) extinct, 1504 | Dukedom of York (3rd creation) merged in the Crown, 1509 | Dukedom of Somerset (3rd creation) extinct, 1500
Duke of Ross (2nd creation), 1514
King James V 1512–1542 | Alexander Stewart; 1514–1515; Duke of Ross
Duke of Albany (3rd creation), 1565 | Dukedom of Ross (2nd creation) extinct, 1515
Henry Stuart; 1546–1567; 1st Duke of Albany | Queen Mary; 1542–1587
James; 1566–1625; 2nd Duke of Albany, later King James VI & I
Dukedom of Albany (3rd creation) merged in the Crown, 1567
Duke of Albany (4th creation), 1604; Duke of York (4th creation), 1605 | Duke of Kintyre and Lorne, 1602
Elizabeth Stuart; 1596–1662 | Henry Frederick; 1594–1612 | Charles; 1600–1649; Duke of Albany, Duke of York, later King Charles I | Robert Stuart; 1602; Duke of Kintyre and Lorne
Dukedom of Albany (4th creation), Dukedom of York (4th creation) merged in the Crown, 1625 | Dukedom of Kintyre and Lorne extinct, 1602
Duke of York (5th creation) 1644; Duke of Albany (5th creation), 1660 | Duke of Gloucester (4th creation), 1659
Sophia of Hanover; 1630–1714 | James Stuart; 1633–1701; Duke of York, Duke of Albany, later King James VII & II | Henry; 1640–1660; Duke of Gloucester
Dukedom of Albany (5th creation) and Dukedom of York (5th creation) merged in the Crown, 1685 | Dukedom of Gloucester (4th creation) extinct, 1660
Duke of York and Albany (1st creation), 1716 | Duke of Cambridge (1st creation), 1664 | Duke of Kendal (1st creation), 1666 | Duke of Cambridge (2nd creation), 1667
King George I 1660–1727 | Ernest Augustus; 1674–1728; Duke of York and Albany | Charles Stuart; 1660–1661 styled Duke of Cambridge | James Stuart; 1663–1667; Duke of Cambridge | Queen Anne; 1665–1714 | Charles Stuart; 1666–1667 designated Duke of Kendal | Edgar Stuart; 1667–1671; Duke of Cambridge | Charles Stuart; 1677 styled Duke of Cambridge
Dukedom of York and Albany (1st creation) extinct, 1728 | Dukedom of Cambridge (1st creation) extinct, 1667 | Dukedom of Kendal (1st creation), extinct, 1667 | Dukedom of Cambridge (2nd creation) extinct, 1671
Duke of Cambridge (3rd creation)
George; 1683–1760; Duke of Cambridge, later King George II | William; 1689–1700 styled Duke of Gloucester
Dukedom of Cambridge (3rd creation) merged with the Crown, 1727
Duke of Edinburgh (1st creation), 1726 | Duke of Cumberland (3rd creation), 1726
Frederick; 1707–1751; 1st Duke of Edinburgh, styled Duke of Gloucester until created Duke of Edinburgh | William Augustus; 1721–1765; Duke of Cumberland
Dukedom of Cumberland (3rd creation) extinct, 1765
Duke of York and Albany (2nd creation), 1760 | Duke of Gloucester and Edinburgh, 1764 | Duke of Cumberland and Strathearn, 1766
George; 1738–1820; 2nd Duke of Edinburgh, later King George III | Edward; 1739–1767; Duke of York and Albany | William Henry; 1743–1805; 1st Duke of Gloucester and Edinburgh | Henry; 1745–1790; Duke of Cumberland and Strathearn
Dukedom of Edinburgh (1st creation), merged in the Crown, 1760 | Dukedom of York and Albany (2nd creation) extinct, 1767 | Dukedom of Cumberland and Strathearn extinct, 1790
Duke of York and Albany (3rd creation), 1784 | Duke of Clarence and St Andrews, 1789 | Duke of Kent and Strathearn, 1799 | Duke of Cumberland and Teviotdale, 1799 | Duke of Sussex (1st creation), 1801 | Duke of Cambridge (4th creation), 1801
Frederick; 1763–1827; Duke of York and Albany | William Henry; 1765–1837, Duke of Clarence and St Andrews, later King William IV | Edward; 1767–1820; Duke of Kent and Strathearn | Ernest Augustus; 1771–1851; King of Hanover, 1st Duke of Cumberland and Teviotdale | Augustus Frederick; 1773–1843; Duke of Sussex | Adolphus; 1774–1850; 1st Duke of Cambridge | Mary; 1776–1857 | William Frederick; 1776–1834; 2nd Duke of Gloucester and Edinburgh
Dukedom of York and Albany (3rd creation) extinct, 1827 | Dukedom of Clarence and St Andrews merged in the Crown, 1830 | Dukedom of Kent and Strathearn extinct, 1820 | Dukedom of Sussex (1st creation) extinct, 1843 | Dukedom of Gloucester and Edinburgh extinct, 1834
Queen Victoria; 1819–1901 | George V 1819–1878; King of Hanover, 2nd Duke of Cumberland and Teviotdale | George; 1819–1904; 2nd Duke of Cambridge | Mary Adelaide; 1833–1897
Dukedom of Cambridge (4th creation) extinct, 1904
Duke of Edinburgh (2nd creation), 1866 | Duke of Connaught and Strathearn, 1874 | Duke of Albany (6th creation), 1881
King Edward VII; 1841–1910 | Ernest Augustus; 1845–1923; 3rd Duke of Cumberland and Teviotdale | Alice; 1843–1878 | Alfred Ernest Albert; 1844–1900; Duke of Edinburgh | Arthur; 1850–1942; 1st Duke of Connaught and Strathearn | Leopold; 1853–1884; 1st Duke of Albany
Dukedom of Cumberland and Teviotdale forfeit, 1919 | Dukedom of Edinburgh (2nd creation) extinct, 1900
Duke of Clarence and Avondale, 1890 | Duke of York (6th creation), 1892
Albert Victor; 1864–1892; Duke of Clarence and Avondale | George; 1865–1936; Duke of York, later King George V | Mary of Teck; 1867–1953 | Victoria of Hesse and by Rhine; 1863–1950 | Arthur of Connaught; 1883–1938
Dukedom of Clarence and Avondale extinct, 1892 | Dukedom of York (6th creation) merged in the Crown, 1910
Duke of Windsor, 1937 | Duke of York (7th creation), 1920 | Duke of Kent (2nd creation), 1934 | Duke of Gloucester (5th creation), 1928
King Edward VIII; 1894–1972; Later Duke of Windsor | Albert; 1895–1952; Duke of York, later King George VI | Alice of Battenberg; 1885–1969 | George; 1902–1942; 1st Duke of Kent | Henry; 1900–1974; 1st Duke of Gloucester | Alastair Arthur; 1914–1943; 2nd Duke of Connaught and Strathearn | Charles Edward; 1884–1954; 2nd Duke of Albany
Dukedom of Windsor extinct, 1972 | Dukedom of York (7th creation) merged in the Crown, 1936 | Dukedom of Connaught and Strathearn extinct, 1943 | Dukedom of Albany (6th creation) forfeit, 1919
Duke of Edinburgh (3rd creation), 1947
Queen Elizabeth II; 1926–2022 | Philip; 1921–2021; 1st Duke of Edinburgh | Edward b. 1935; 2nd Duke of Kent
Duke of York (8th creation), 1986 (revoked 2025) | Duke of Edinburgh (4th creation), 2023
Charles b. 1948; 2nd Duke of Edinburgh, later King Charles III | Andrew b. 1960; Duke of York | Edward b. 1964; Duke of Edinburgh | George Windsor b. 1962 | Richard b. 1944; 2nd Duke of Gloucester
Dukedom of Edinburgh (3rd creation) merged in the Crown, 2022 | No male heirs | Dukedom of Edinburgh (4th creation) is a life peerage and therefore not hereditary | Heir apparent to the Dukedom of Kent
Duke of Cambridge (5th creation), 2011 | Duke of Sussex (2nd creation), 2018
William b. 1982; Duke of Cambridge | Harry b. 1984; Duke of Sussex | Edward Windsor b. 1988 | Alexander Windsor b. 1974
Heir-apparent to the Dukedom of Gloucester
George of Wales b. 2013 | Archie of Sussex b. 2019
Heir apparent to the Dukedom of Cambridge | Heir apparent to the Dukedom of Sussex

== See also ==
- Duchess of Norfolk
- Baron Howard of Penrith
- Norfolk Herald Extraordinary
- Viscount FitzAlan of Derwent
