= Henry Fitzalan-Howard, 15th Duke of Norfolk =

British philanthropist and politician (1847–1917)

His Grace The Duke of Norfolk KG GCVO VD PC
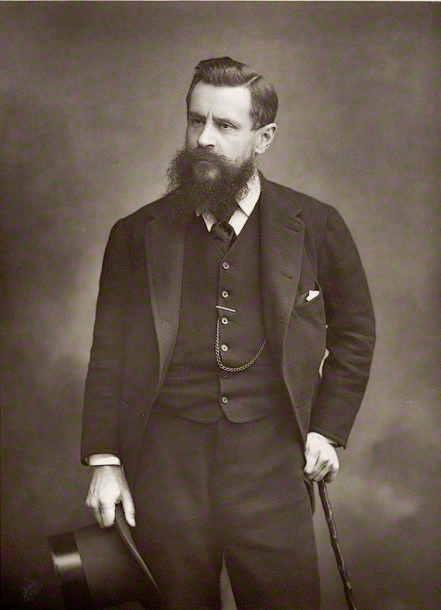
- Henry Fitzalan-Howard (1890) by Walery

Earl Marshal
- In office 25 November 1860 – 11 February 1917
- Monarchs: Victoria; Edward VII; George V
- Preceded by: The 14th Duke of Norfolk
- Succeeded by: The 16th Duke of Norfolk

Postmaster General
- In office 6 July 1895 – 10 April 1900
- Monarchs: Victoria; Edward VII
- Prime Minister: The Marquess of Salisbury
- Preceded by: Arnold Morley
- Succeeded by: The Marquess of Londonderry

1st Mayor of Westminster
- In office 1900–1901
- Preceded by: Office established
- Succeeded by: Clifford Probyn

Member of the House of Lords Lord Temporal
- In office 25 November 1860 – 11 February 1917; Hereditary Peerage
- Preceded by: The 14th Duke of Norfolk
- Succeeded by: The 16th Duke of Norfolk

Personal details
- Born: 27 December 1847
- Died: 11 February 1917 (aged 69)
- Party: Conservative
- Spouse(s): Lady Flora Abney-Hastings (m. 1878; died 1887) Gwendolen Constable-Maxwell (m. 1904)
- Children: Philip Fitzalan-Howard, Earl of Arundel and Surrey; Lady Mary Rachel Fitzalan-Howard; Bernard Fitzalan-Howard, 16th Duke of Norfolk; Lady Katherine Fitzalan-Howard; Lady Winifred Fitzalan-Howard
- Parent(s): Henry Fitzalan-Howard, 14th Duke of Norfolk; Hon. Augusta Lyons

Henry Fitzalan-Howard, 15th Duke of Norfolk, KG, GCVO, VD, PC (27 December 1847 – 11 February 1917), styled Lord Maltravers until 1856 and Earl of Arundel and Surrey between 1856 and 1860, was a British Unionist politician and philanthropist. He served as Postmaster General between 1895 and 1900, but is best remembered for his philanthropic work, which concentrated on Roman Catholic causes and the city of Sheffield.

== Background ==
Norfolk was the eldest son of Henry Fitzalan-Howard, 14th Duke of Norfolk, and the Hon. Augusta Mary Minna Catherine, younger daughter of Edmund Lyons, 1st Baron Lyons. Edmund Fitzalan-Howard, 1st Viscount Fitzalan of Derwent, was his younger brother. The Duke was first educated at The Oratory School, but owing to restrictions from the Catholic Hierarchy he was unable to attend either Oxford or Cambridge Universities. His higher education instead consisted of a Grand Tour of Europe around 1867 under the guidance of classical scholar and biographer Robert Ornsby.

== Public career ==
Norfolk succeeded to the dukedom at the age of 12 on the death of his father on 25 November 1860. He also succeeded to the hereditary office of Earl Marshal held by the Dukes of Norfolk. At the same time he inherited almost 50,000 acres with 19,400 acres in the West Riding of Yorkshire, 21,000 acres in Sussex and 4,400 acres in Norfolk.

On 5 April 1871 he was commissioned as captain in the part-time 9th (Arundel) Sussex Rifle Volunteer Corps, which had been raised by his father just before his death. He was promoted to major in the 2nd Sussex Rifle Volunteers on 4 March 1882.

In 1895, he was sworn of the Privy Council and appointed Postmaster General by Lord Salisbury, a post he held until early 1900, when he resigned in order to serve in the Boer War. In 1895 he also became Mayor of Sheffield; serving two terms during which he arranged the city's monumental celebrations in honour of Queen Victoria's Diamond Jubilee in 1897. Shortly thereafter he was appointed the first Lord Mayor of Sheffield, but retained the office only until November 1897. He was appointed an honorary Freeman of the City of Sheffield three years later, in March 1900. In November 1900 he became the first Mayor of Westminster, serving for a year.

Aged 53, he volunteered for active service in the Second Boer War, and was commissioned a captain in the Imperial Yeomanry on 7 April 1900, leaving Southampton for South Africa the same month on the SS Carisbrooke Castle. While fighting he was wounded near Pretoria, and invalided back to Britain. After the end of the war, he was promoted to Lieutenant-Colonel Commandant of his volunteer battalion (now the 2nd Volunteer Battalion, Royal Sussex Regiment) on 24 December 1902, with the honorary rank of Colonel from 7 February 1903.

He was appointed to chair the Royal Commission on Militia and Volunteers that was established in 1903. The commission attempted to define the role of the auxiliary forces, and made detailed proposals on how their deficiencies in training and equipment could be addressed. Norfolk's commission proposed a Home Defence Army raised by conscription, which was unpopular with the Volunteers and Yeomanry, and was quickly shelved. However, in conjunction with the Elgin Commission on the War in South Africa, the Norfolk Commission's work influenced the creation of the Territorial Force (TF) under the 1908 Haldane Reforms, which subsumed the old Volunteer Force. He retired from command of the 4th Battalion, Royal Sussex Regiment (as the battalion had become in the TF) in 1913 after 42 years' service.

In his capacity as Earl Marshal, the duke arranged the state funerals of William Ewart Gladstone (1898), Queen Victoria (1901), and King Edward VII (1910), and the coronations of Edward VII (1902) and George V (1911).

Apart from serving as Earl Marshal between 1860 and 1917, Norfolk was Lord Lieutenant of Sussex between 1905 and 1917.

He was made a Knight of the Garter in 1886, and received the Knight Grand Cross of the Royal Victorian Order (GCVO) from King Edward VII on 11 August 1902, following the King's coronation two days earlier.

He was three-time chairman of the National Union of Conservative Associations, and grand chancellor of the Primrose League.

A portrait of the Duke as Mayor of Westminster, painted by Philip Tennyson Cole in 1902, is owned by the City of Westminster.

== Philanthropy and religious work ==
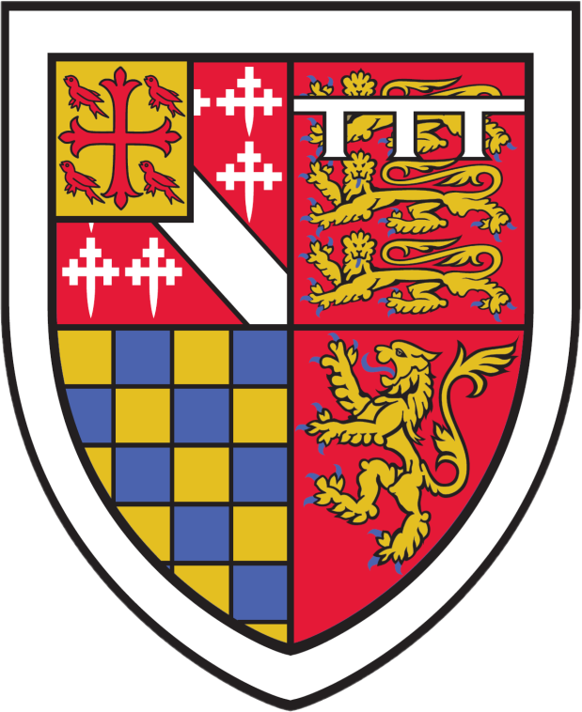
Arms of St Edmund's College, Cambridge: Arms of the founder Henry Fitzalan-Howard, 15th Duke of Norfolk (quarterly of four: Howard, Brotherton, Warenne, FitzAlan) with a canton of St Edmund of Abingdon (Or, a cross fleury gules between four Cornish choughs proper) all within a bordure argent

As is common with the Dukes of Norfolk, but exceptional within the British aristocracy, Norfolk was a Roman Catholic. In his dual role as Premier Duke and most prominent Catholic in England, he undertook a programme of philanthropy which served in part to reintegrate Catholics into civic life. He was born a generation after the Roman Catholic Relief Act 1829 but before the reconstitution of Roman Catholic dioceses in 1850. By the time he came of age as Duke in 1868, the process of Catholic Emancipation had made the establishment of Catholic institutions legal, but the reality of two hundred years of legislation in favour of the Church of England left Catholics with few structures of their own.

Norfolk's first major benefaction commemorated his coming of age as Duke. At his ancestral seat of Arundel Castle (being also one of the Earls of Arundel), he sponsored the construction of the Church of Our Lady and St Philip Neri between 1868 and 1873. This church was later chosen to serve as Arundel Cathedral in 1965 and rededicated in 1971 to include Saint Philip Howard, 20th Earl of Arundel, one of his ancestors.

In 1875 John Henry Newman wrote his response to the anti-Catholic views of William Gladstone which took the form of a public letter to Norfolk (after Norfolk agreed to this proposal), being titled Letter to the Duke of Norfolk.

In 1877, he married his first wife, Lady Flora Hastings. He later wrote, 'Shortly after my most happy marriage, I wished to build a church as a thank-offering to God.' To commemorate this occasion, he undertook the construction of a church in his titular ancestral seat in Norwich, Norfolk. After commencing in 1882 with a gift of £200,000, construction would not be completed until 1910, nearly 23 years after Lady Flora's death in 1887. This church was also later chosen to serve as St John the Baptist Cathedral, Norwich when the Roman Catholic Diocese of East Anglia was re-established in 1976.

In the 1890s Norfolk was instrumental in the campaign that convinced the Vatican authorities to relax its restrictions on Catholic students enrolling at the great English universities, culminating with the co-founding of St Edmund's College, Cambridge along with Baron Anatole von Hugel. He was a significant contributor to the Father Damien fund to fight leprosy. He also donated funds for the building of the University of Sheffield and was its initial Chancellor between 1905 and 1917.

From 1898 on, he edited, together with Charles Tindal Gatty, the hymnal Arundel Hymns, to which Pope Leo XIII contributed a preface in the form of a personal letter.

== Family ==
On 18 March 1878, Norfolk married his first wife, Lady Flora Paulyna Hetty Barbara Abney-Hastings (13 February 1854 – 11 April 1887), daughter of Charles Abney-Hastings, 1st Baron Donington and Edith Rawdon-Hastings, 10th Countess of Loudoun. They had one child:

- Philip Joseph Mary Fitzalan-Howard, Earl of Arundel and Surrey (7 September 1879 – 8 July 1902)

Their son was born with severe physical and intellectual disabilities, and "all the resources of medical science were applied on behalf of the affected infant, but only with partial effect".

When his death was announced at age 22, it was reported that "he had never grown up, remaining all his life a boy, with a sweet face, half-blind, blond, with almost albino-like fairness, and suffering from a general failure of nervous power." His parents exhausted all financial and spiritual efforts to seek medical and rehabilitative help for him.

After the Duchess's death from Bright's disease in April 1887, aged 33, Norfolk remained unmarried for nearly seventeen years. His sister, Lady Mary Adeliza Fitzalan-Howard, moved in to Arundel Castle to help care for her nephew. The Duke built a large house in Wimbledon, where he would still be able to spend two hours a day with his son while the House of Lords was in session. Near the end of his life, the Earl was able to ride a tricycle for long periods around the grounds. He died in 1902.

On 7 February 1904, at age 56, Norfolk married, as his second wife, his first cousin once removed, the Hon. Gwendolen Constable-Maxwell, eldest daughter of Marmaduke Constable-Maxwell, 11th Lord Herries of Terregles and the Hon. Angela Mary Charlotte, daughter of Edward Fitzalan-Howard, 1st Baron Howard of Glossop. She was 30 years his junior, and aged 27 at their wedding. They had four children:

- Lady Mary Rachel Fitzalan-Howard (27 June 1905 – 17 August 1992)
- Bernard Fitzalan-Howard, 16th Duke of Norfolk (1908–1975)
- Lady Katherine Mary Fitzalan-Howard (1912-2000) married in 1940 Joseph Anthony Moore Phillips. Lady Katherine Phillips was the aunt of Captain Mark Phillips.
- Lady Winifrede Alice Fitzalan-Howard (1914–2006) married in 1943 Lieutenant-Colonel John Edward Broke Freeman

In 1908, Gwendolen, Duchess of Norfolk, succeeded her father as Lady Herries of Terregles. The Duke of Norfolk died in February 1917, aged 69, and was succeeded in the dukedom by his only surviving son, Bernard. On his death, Lord Curzon said he was a man "who was diffident about powers which were in excess of the ordinary". The Dowager Duchess of Norfolk died in August 1945, aged 68. She was succeeded in the Scottish lordship of parliament by her son, Bernard.

=== Ancestry ===
Ancestors of Henry Fitzalan-Howard, 15th Duke of Norfolk

8. Bernard Howard, 12th Duke of Norfolk
4. Henry Howard, 13th Duke of Norfolk
9. Lady Elizabeth Belasyse
2. Henry Fitzalan-Howard, 14th Duke of Norfolk
10. George Leveson-Gower, 1st Duke of Sutherland
5. Lady Charlotte Leveson-Gower
11. Elizabeth Gordon, 19th Countess of Sutherland
1. Henry Fitzalan-Howard, 15th Duke of Norfolk
12. Captain John Lyons
6. Edmund Lyons, 1st Baron Lyons
13. Catherine Walrond
3. The Honourable Augusta Lyons
14. Captain Josias Rogers
7. Augusta Rogers

=== Family tree ===
Family tree of the Dukes of Norfolk and Suke of Surrey; Earls of Arundel, East Anglia, Norfolk, Norwich, Nottingham, and Surrey; and Barons Mowbray, Segrave and Stourton

Earl of East Anglia (Earls of Norfolk and Suffolk) (1st creation), a. 1069
Ralph the Staller c. 1011–1068; 1st Earl of Norfolk and Suffolk, or of the East Angles (Earl c. 1066/67 – 1068)
Earl of Surrey (1st creation), c. 1088
Ralph de Gael a. 1040–1100; 2nd Earl of Norfolk and Suffolk, or of the East Angles (Earl 1068–1074)	Roger Bigod (Bigot) d. 1107; Sheriff of Norfolk and Suffolk	William de Warenne c. 1035–1088; 1st Earl (of) Warenne / Earl of Surrey, Lord of Lewes, Seigneur de Varennes
Earldom forfeit, 1074
Earl of Norfolk (2nd creation), 1141
King Henry I c. 1068–1135	Maud Bigod	William Bigod d. 1120	Hugh Bigod; 1095–1177; 1st Earl of Norfolk (Earl 1141–1177)	William de Warenne d. 1138; 2nd Earl (of) Warenne / Earl of Surrey
Earl of Arundel, Earl of Sussex (1st creations), c. 1138
Empress Matilda c. 1102–1167	Geoffrey Plantagenet; 1113–1251; Count of Anjou	Adeliza of Louvain c. 1103–1151	William d'Aubigny c. 1109–1176; 1st Earl of Arundel (Sussex), Earl of Lincoln	William de Warenne; 1119–1148; 3rd Earl of Surrey
King Henry II; 1133–1189	William d'Aubigny b. c. 1138/1150–1176; 2nd Earl of Arundel (Sussex)	Roger Bigod c. 1144/1150–1221; 2nd Earl of Norfolk (Earl 1189–1221, disputed 1177–1189)	William of Blois c. 1137–1159	Isabel de Warenne c. 1130 – 1203; 4th Countess of Surrey suo jure	Hamelin de Warenne c. 1130–1202; Comte de Warenne / Earl of Surrey, jure uxoris
King John; 1166/1167–1216	William d'Aubigny a. 1180–1221; 3rd Earl of Arundel (Sussex)	Hugh Bigod; 1186–1225; 3rd Earl of Norfolk (Earl 1221–1225)	Maud Marshal; 1192–1248	William de Warenne c. 1160s/1170s–1240 5th Earl of Surrey
William d'Aubigny c. 1203–a. 1124; 4th Earl of Arundel (Sussex)	Hugh d'Aubigny d. 1243; 5th Earl of Arundel (Sussex)	Isabel d'Aubigny	John Fitzalan; 1200–1240; Lord of Clun and Oswestry	Roger Bigod c. 1209–1270; 4th Earl of Norfolk (Earl 1233–1270)	Hugh Bigod c. 1211–1266
Earl of Sussex (1st creation), 1282
King Henry III; 1207–1272	John Fitzalan; 1223–1267; 6th Earl of Arundel (Sussex), jure matris	John de Warenne; 1231–1304; 1st Earl of Sussex (Earl of Sussex 1282–1304), 6th Earl of Surrey (Earl of Surrey 1240–1304)
Baron Segrave of Se(a)grave, 1283
Nicholas Segrave c. 1238–a. 1295; 1st Baron Segrave	King Edward I 1239–1307	Edmund Crouchback; 1245–1296; Earl of Lancaster	John Fitzalan; 1246–1272; 7th Earl of Arundel (Sussex), jure matris	Roger Bigod c. 1245–1306; 5th Earl of Norfolk (Earl 1270–1306)
Earldom extinct, 1270
Baron Mowbray, 1283	Earl of Arundel (2nd (1st by writ) creation), 1289
John Segrave c. 1256–1325; 2nd Baron Segrave	Roger de Mowbray; 1254–1297; 1st Baron Mowbray	Richard Fitzalan; 1267–1302; 1st (or 6th) Earl of Arundel	William de Warenne; 1256–1286
Earl of Norfolk (3rd creation), 1312
Stephen Segrave d. 1325; 3rd Baron Segrave	Thomas of Brotherton; 1300–1338; 1st Earl of Norfolk (Earl 1312–1338)	John Mowbray; 1286–1322; 2nd Baron Mowbray	Henry c. 1281–1345; Earl of Leicester, Earl of Lancaster	Edmund Fitzalan; 1286–1326; 2nd (or 7th) Earl of Arundel	Alice de Warenne; 1287–1388 heir apparent to the Earldom of Surrey	John de Warenne; 1286–1347; 7th Earl of Surrey, 2nd Earl of Sussex
Earldom of Arundel (2nd creation) forfeit, 1326	Earldom of Sussex extinct(?), 1347
Earldom of Arundel (2nd creation) restored, 1331
John Segrave; 1315–1353; 4th Baron Segrave	Margaret of Brotherton; 1320–1399; Duchess of Norfolk "for life" (Duchess 1397–1399), 2nd Countess of Norfolk (Countess 1338–1399),	John Mowbray; 1310–1361; 3rd Baron Mowbray	Joan of Lancaster c. 1312–1349	Eleanor of Lancaster; 1318–1372	Richard FitzAlan c. 1313–1376; 3rd (or 8th) Earl of Arundel (Earl of Arundel 1331–1376), 8th Earl of Surrey (Earl of Surrey 1347–1376)
Baron Arundel, 1377
Elizabeth de Segrave; 1338–1368; 5th Baroness Segrave	John de Mowbray; 1340–1368; 4th Baron Mowbray	Richard FitzAlan; 1346–1397; 4th (or 9th) Earl of Arundel, 9th Earl of Surrey	John FitzAlan c. 1348–1379; 1st Baron Arundel	Alice FitzAlan
Earldom of Arundel (2nd creation) forfeit, 1397
Earl of Nottingham (1st creation), 1377	Earl of Nottingham (2nd creation), 1383; Duke of Norfolk (1st creation), 1397	Duke of Surrey, 1397
John de Mowbray; 1365–1383; Earl of Nottingham (Earl 1377–1383), 6th Baron Segrave, 5th Baron Mowbray (Baron 1368–1383)	Thomas de Mowbray; 1366–1399; 1st Duke of Norfolk, etc. (Duke 1397–1399), 3rd Earl of Norfolk (Earl 1399), 7th Baron Segrave, 6th Baron Mowbray (Baron 1377–1399)	Elizabeth Fitzalan; 1366–1425	John FitzAlan; 1364–1390; 2nd Baron Arundel	Thomas Holland; 1372–1400; Duke of Surrey, Earl of Kent, Baron Holland
Earldom of Nottingham extinct, 1383	Titles forfeit, 1399	Dukedom of Surrey renounced, 1400
Baron Stourton, 1448	Duke of Norfolk (1st creation restored), 1425	Earldom of Arundel (2nd creation) restored, 1400
John Stourton; 1400–1462; 1st Baron Stourton (Baron 1448–1462)	Thomas de Mowbray; 1385–1405; 4th Earl of Norfolk, 8th Baron Segrave, 7th Baron Mowbray (Earl 1399–1405)	John de Mowbray; 1392–1432; 2nd Duke of Norfolk (Duke 1425–1432), 5th Earl of Norfolk, 9th Baron Segrave, 8th Baron Mowbray (Earl 1405–1432)	Margaret de Mowbray c. 1388–1459	Robert Howard; 1385–1436	Isabel de Mowbray c. 1400–1452	Thomas FitzAlan; 1381–1415; 5th (or 10th) Earl of Arundel, 10th Earl of Surrey	John Fitzalan; 1385–1421; 6th (or 11th) Earl of Arundel, 3rd Baron Arundel, 3rd Baron Maltravers
Duke of Norfolk (4th creation), 1483
William Stourton a. 1426–1478; 2nd Baron Stourton (Baron 1462–1478)	John de Mowbray; 1415–1461; 3rd Duke of Norfolk, 6th Earl of Norfolk, 10th Baron Segrave, 9th Baron Mowbray (Duke 1432–1461)	John Howard; 1425–1485; 1st Duke of Norfolk, 13th Baron Segrave, 12th Baron Mowbray (Duke 1483–1485)	John Fitzalan; 1408–1435; 7th (or 12th) Earl of Arundel, 4th Baron Arundel, 4th Baron Maltravers	William Fitzalan; 1417–1487; 9th (or 14th) Earl of Arundel, 6th Baron Arundel, 6th Baron Maltravers
Titles forfeit, 1485
Earl of Surrey (2nd creation), 1451	Duke of Norfolk (4th creation) restored and Earl of Surrey, 1514
John Stourton c. 1454–1485; 3rd Baron Stourton (Baron 1479–1485)	William Stourton c. 1457–1524; 5th Baron Stourton (Baron 1487–1524)	John de Mowbray; 1444–1476; 4th Duke of Norfolk, 7th Earl of Norfolk, 11th Baron Segrave, 10th Baron Mowbray (Duke 1461–1476), Earl of Surrey (Earl 1451–1476)	King Edward IV; 1442–1483	Thomas Howard; 1443–1524; 2nd Duke of Norfolk, 1st Earl of Surrey (Duke 1514–1524)	Humfrey Fitzalan; 1429–1438; 8th (or 13th) Earl of Arundel, 5th Baron Arundel, 5th Baron Maltravers	Thomas Fitzalan; 1450–1524; 10th (or 15th) Earl of Arundel, 7th Baron Arundel, 7th Baron Maltravers
Dukedom of Norfolk, Earldom of Nottingham, Earldom of Surrey extinct, 1476
Duke of Norfolk (3rd creation), Earl of Nottingham (3rd creation), and Earl of Surrey, 1477
Francis Stourton; 1485–1487; 4th Baron Stourton (Baron 1485–1487)	Edward Stourton; 1463–1535; 6th Baron Stourton (Baron 1524–1535)	Anne de Mowbray; 1472–1481; 8th Countess of Norfolk, 12th Baroness Segrave, 11th Baroness Mowbray (Countess 1476–1481)	Richard of Shrewsbury; 1473–1483; Duke of York, Duke of Norfolk, Earl of Nottingham, Earl of Warenne (Duke 1477–1483)	Anne of York; 1475–1511	Thomas Howard; 1473–1554; 3rd Duke of Norfolk, 2nd Earl of Surrey (Duke 1524–1554)	Edmund Howard c. 1478–1539	Elizabeth Boleyn c. 1480–1538	William Fitzalan; 1476–1544; 11th (or 16th) Earl of Arundel, 8th Baron Arundel, 8th Baron Maltravers
Earldom of Norfolk extinct and Baronies Segrave and Mowbray in abeyance, 1481	Dukedom of Norfolk, Earldom of Nottingham, Earldom of Surrey extinct, 1483	Attainted, 1547; Restored, 1553
William Stourton c. 1505–1548; 7th Baron Stourton	Earl of Nottingham (5th creation), 1525	King Henry VIII; 1491–1547	Anne Boleyn c. 1501 or 1507–1536
Viscount Howard of Bindon, 1559
Charles Stourton c. 1520–1557; 8th Baron Stourton	Henry Howard; 1517–1547 styled Earl of Surrey	Thomas Howard c. 1520–1582; 1st Viscount Howard of Bindon	Mary FitzRoy; 1519–1557	Henry FitzRoy; 1519–1536; Duke of Richmond and Somerset, Earl of Nottingham	Catherine Howard c. 1524–1542	Henry Fitzalan; 1512–1580; 12th (or 17th) Earl of Arundel, 9th Baron Arundel, 9th Baron Maltravers
Earldom of Nottingham extinct, 1536
Thomas Howard; 1536–1572; 4th Duke of Norfolk, 3rd Earl of Surrey, 13th Baron Mowbray (Duke 1554–1572)	Henry Howard; 1540–1614; Earl of Northampton	Queen Elizabeth I 1533–1603	Mary FitzAlan; 1540–1557
Dukedom (3rd creation) forfeit, 1572
Earl of Arundel (3rd creation), 1580	Earl of Suffolk (4th creation), 1603
John Stourton; 1553–1588; 9th Baron Stourton	Edward Stourton c. 1555–1633; 10th Baron Stourton	Philip Howard; 1557–1595; 20th/13th/1st Earl of Arundel, styled Earl of Surrey	Thomas Howard; 1561–1626; Earl of Suffolk	Lord William Howard; 1563–1640
Earldom of Arundel and Barony of Mowbray attainted, 1589	see Earls, Marquesses, and Dukes of Suffolk family tree
Earl of Arundel (3rd creation) and Barony of Mowbray restored, 1604; Earl of Norfolk (5th creation), 1644
William Stourton c. 1594–1672; 11th Baron Stourton	Thomas Howard; 1585–1646; 21st/14th/2nd Earl of Arundel, 2nd/4th Earl of Surrey, 1st Earl of Norfolk, 14th Baron Mowbray (Earl 1644–1646)	Philip
see Earls of Shrewsbury family tree
Edward Stourton; 1617–1644	Alethea Talbot; 1585–1654; 17th Baroness Strange of Blackmere, 14th Baroness Talbot, 13th Baroness Furnivall	Henry Frederick Howard; 1608–1652; 22nd/15th/3rd Earl of Arundel, 3rd/5th Earl of Surrey, 2nd Earl of Norfolk, 15th Baron Mowbray (Earl 1646–1652)	William Howard; 1614–1680; Viscount Stafford	William
Duke of Norfolk (4th creation restored), 1660	Baron Howard of Castle Rising, 1669; Earl of Norwich (3rd creation), 1672
William Stourton d. 1685; 12th Baron Stourton	Thomas Howard; 1627–1677; 5th Duke of Norfolk, 21st/14th/2nd Earl of Arundel, 4th/6th Earl of Surrey, 16th Baron Mowbray (Duke 1660–1677) 18th Baron Strange of Blackmere, 15th Baron Talbot, 14th Baron Furnivall (Baron 1654–1677)	Henry Howard; 1628–1684; 6th Duke of Norfolk, 22nd/15th/3rd Earl of Arundel, 5th/7th Earl of Surrey; 18th Baron Strange of Blackmere, 17th Baron Mowbray, 15th Baron Talbot, 14th Baron Furnivall (Duke 1677–1684) 1st Earl of Norwich, etc. (Earl 1672–1684)	Charles Howard; 1630–1713	Col. Bernard Howard; 1641–1717	Charles Howard; 1628–1685; Earl of Carlisle
Edward Stourton; 1665–1720; 13th Baron Stourton	Thomas Stourton; 1667–1744; 14th Baron Stourton	Charles Stourton; 1669–1739	Henry Howard; 1655–1701; 7th Duke of Norfolk, 22nd/15th/3rd Earl of Arundel, 5th/7th Earl of Surrey, 2nd Earl of Norwich, etc. 18th Baron Mowbray, 19th Baron Strange of Blackmere, 15th Baron Talbot, 14th Baron Furnivall (Duke 1684–1701)	Lord Thomas Howard; 1662–1689	Henry Charles Howard d. 1720
Thomas Howard; 1683–1732; 8th Duke of Norfolk, 23rd/16th/4th Earl of Arundel, 6th/8th Earl of Surrey, 3rd Earl of Norwich, etc. 18th Baron Strange of Blackmere, 15th Baron Talbot, 14th Baron Furnivall, 19th Baron Mowbray (Duke 1701–1732)	Edward Howard; 1685–1777; 9th Duke of Norfolk, 24th/17th/5th Earl of Arundel, 7th/9th Earl of Surrey, 4th Earl of Norwich, etc. 20th Baron Mowbray, 20th Baron Strange of Blackmere, 15th Baron Talbot, 14th Baron Furnivall (Duke 1732–1777)	Philip Howard; 1688–1750	Bernard Howard; 1674–1735
Earldom of Norwich (3rd creation) and Barony of Howard of Castle Rising extinct and Baronies of Furnivall, Mowbray, Segrave, Strange of Blackmere, and Talbot abeyant, 1777
Charles Stourton; 1702–1753; 15th Baron Stourton	William Stourton; 1704–1781; 16th Baron Stourton	Winifred Howard; 1726–1753	Anne Howard; 1742–1787	Charles Howard; 1720–1786; 10th Duke of Norfolk, 25th/18th/6th Earl of Arundel, 8th/10th Earl of Surrey (Duke 1777–1786)	Henry Howard; 1713–1787
Charles Philip Stourton; 1752–1816; 17th Baron Stourton	Charles Howard; 1746–1815; 11th Duke of Norfolk, 26th/19th/7th Earl of Arundel, 9th/11th Earl of Surrey (Duke 1786–1815)
William Stourton; 1776–1846; 18th Baron Stourton	Bernard Howard; 1765–1842; 12th Duke of Norfolk, 27th/20th/8th Earl of Arundel, 10th/12th Earl of Surrey (Duke 1815–1842)	Henry Howard-Molyneux-Howard; 1766–1824
Charles Stourton; 1802–1872; 19th Baron Stourton	Henry Howard; 1791–1856; 13th Duke of Norfolk, 28th/21st/9th Earl of Arundel, 11th/13th Earl of Surrey (Duke 1842–1856)	Henry Howard-Molyneux-Howard; 1802–1875
Baron Mowbray and Baron Segrave abeayance restored, 1878	Baron Howard of Glossop, 1869
Alfred Joseph Stourton; 1829–1893; 24th Baron Segrave, 21st/23rd Baron Mowbray, 20th Baron Stourton	Henry Granville Fitzalan-Howard; 1815–1860; 14th Duke of Norfolk, 29th/22nd/10th Earl of Arundel, 12th/14th Earl of Surrey (Duke 1856–1860)	Edward George Fitzalan-Howard; 1818–1883; 1st Baron Howard of Glossop
Baron Howard of Penrith, 1830
Charles Botolph Joseph Stourton; 1867–1936; 25th Baron Segrave, 22nd/24th Baron Mowbray, 21st Baron Stourton	Henry Fitzalan-Howard; 1847–1917; 15th Duke of Norfolk, 30th/23rd/11th Earl of Arundel, 13th/15th Earl of Surrey, Lord Maltravers, Earl of Arundel and Surrey (Duke 1860–1917)	Francis Fitzalan-Howard; 1859–1924; 2nd Baron Howard of Glossop	Esmé Howard; 1863–1939; 1st Baron Howard of Penrith
William Marmaduke Stourton; 1895–1965; 26th Baron Segrave, 23rd/25th Baron Mowbray, 22nd Baron Stourton	Bernard Fitzalan-Howard; 1908–1975; 16th Duke of Norfolk, 31st/24th/12th Earl of Arundel, 14th/16th Earl of Surrey (Duke 1917–1975)	Bernard Edward Fitzalan-Howard; 1885–1972; 3rd Baron Howard of Glossop	Francis Howard; 1905–1999; 2nd Baron Howard of Penrith
Charles Edward Stourton; 1923–2006; 27th Baron Segrave, 24th/26th Baron Mowbray, 23rd Baron Stourton	Miles Fitzalan-Howard; 1915–2002; 17th Duke of Norfolk, 32nd/25th/13th Earl of Arundel, 15th/17th Earl of Surrey, 4th Baron Howard of Glossop (Duke 1975–2002) m. Mary Teresa Constable-Maxwell
Edward William Stephen Stourton; 1953–2021; 28th Baron Segrave, 25th/27th Baron Mowbray, 24th Baron Stourton	Marsha Howard b. 1953	Edward Fitzalan-Howard b. 1956; 18th Duke of Norfolk, 33rd/26th/14th Earl of Arundel, 16th/18th Earl of Surrey, 5th Baron Howard of Glossop (from 2002) m. Georgina Susan Gore	Philip Esmé Howard b. 1945; 3rd Baron Howard of Penrith
Sarah Louise Stourton b. 1982	Isabella Laura Stourton b. 1983	Camilla Charlotte Stourton b. 1987	Francesca Jane Stourton b. 1988	James Charles Peter Stourton b. 1991; 29th Baron Segrave, 26th/28th Baron Mowbray, 25th Baron Stourton	Henry Fitzalan-Howard b. 1987 styled Earl of Arundel and Surrey	Thomas Philip Howard b. 1974
Co-heir presumptive to the Baronies Segrave, Mowbray, and Stourton	Co-heir presumptive to the Baronies Segrave, Mowbray, and Stourton	Co-heir presumptive to the Baronies Segrave, Mowbray, and Stourton	Co-heir presumptive to the Baronies Segrave, Mowbray, and Stourton	Heir apparent to the dukedom	Heir apparent to the Barony Howard of Penrith

Political offices
Preceded by Arnold Morley	Postmaster General; 1895–1900	Succeeded by The Marquess of Londonderry
Preceded by New Position	Lord Mayor of Sheffield; July 1897–Nov. 1897	Succeeded by George Franklin
Honorary titles
Preceded by The Duke of Norfolk	Earl Marshal; 1860–1917	Succeeded by The Duke of Norfolk
Preceded by The Marquess of Abergavenny	Lord Lieutenant of Sussex; 1905–1917	Succeeded by The Lord Leconfield
Academic offices
Preceded by New position	Chancellor of the University of Sheffield; 1905–1917	Succeeded by The Marquess of Crewe
Peerage of England
Preceded by Henry Fitzalan-Howard	Duke of Norfolk; 1860–1917	Succeeded by Bernard Fitzalan-Howard
