= Flora Fitzalan-Howard, Duchess of Norfolk =

British noblewoman

Her Grace The Duchess of Norfolk
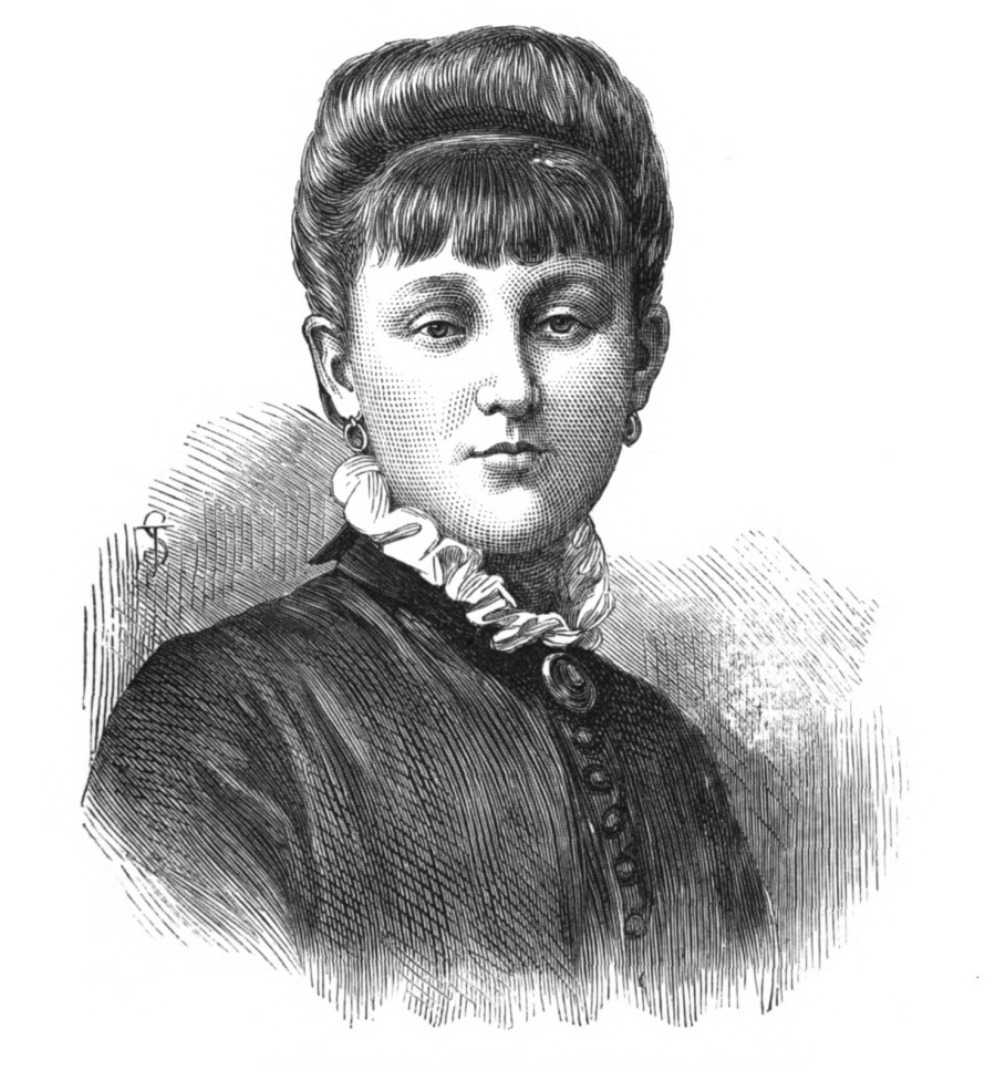
- Duchess of Norfolk, 1877 engraving
- Born: Flora Paulyna Hetty Barbara Clifton; 13 February 1854; Mayfair, London, England
- Died: 11 April 1887 (aged 33); Arundel Castle, Sussex
- Noble family: Howard family
- Spouse: Henry Fitzalan-Howard, 15th Duke of Norfolk (m. 1878)
- Issue: 1
- Father: Charles Abney-Hastings, 1st Baron Donington
- Mother: Edith Rawdon-Hastings, 10th Countess of Loudoun

Flora Fitzalan-Howard, Duchess of Norfolk (née Clifton; 13 February 1854 – 11 April 1887) was a British noblewoman, philanthropist, and convert to Catholicism. Her 1878 marriage to Henry Fitzalan-Howard, 15th Duke of Norfolk "was the event of the fashionable world" and covered widely in the press. They had one child, a severely disabled son, before she died aged 33.

== Early life ==
The Duchess of Norfolk was born in 1854 at Park Lane, Mayfair, the eldest child of Charles Clifton and Lady Edith Rawdon-Hastings. Her mother was the daughter of George Rawdon-Hastings, 2nd Marquess of Hastings, younger brother of Lady Flora Hastings. In 1859, the family assumed the surname Abney-Hastings after her mother inherited the estates of her uncle Charles Abney-Hastings. In 1868, her mother succeeded to the Scottish earldom of Loudoun as 10th Countess of Loudoun, at which point she was styled Lady Flora. Her mother died in 1874. In 1880, her father was raised to the peerage as Baron Donington.

She converted to Catholicism while staying with her cousin Lord Bute, who was also a convert. Her father objected to her religious change, so she was taken under the protection of the Dowager Duchess of Norfolk, who was the mother of her future husband, Henry, Duke of Norfolk. They became engaged on 21 November 1877.

== Marriage and family ==
=== Wedding to Henry Fitzalan-Howard ===
The marriage between Lady Flora and the Duke of Norfolk was a grand event that was well-documented and celebrated in its time, providing a glimpse into the lives of aristocrats in England during the late 19th century.

The nuptials, known as the "Nuptials of Norfolk," took place on November 26, 1877, at the Oratory in Brompton, and were attended by a notable assemblage of aristocrats, including the Lord Bute, Lord Howard, the Princess Louise; and Benjamin Disraeli, the Earl of Beaconsfield and Prime Minister of England.

The wedding stirred up great intrigue among the chattering classes both in England and in the USA, where newspapers provided a detailed account of the wedding. They reported that the bride, Lady Flora, wore a magnificent white satin robe trimmed with point lace and adorned with orange blossoms, a point lace veil, a rich necklace of gems presented by the bridegroom, and a sparkling tiara of diamonds presented by her father. The Duke of Norfolk was dressed in a dark blue coat and lavender pantaloons and wore a light blue cravat.

Following the ceremony, the bridal party retired to the sacristy and signed the marriage register, with Lord Bute, the Earl of Beaconsfield, the Marquis of Lorne, Mgr. Weld, the bride's father, and two or three friends signing as witnesses. The couple later left for Arundel Castle, where they were received with a great welcome from the inhabitants. The castle was illuminated with fire, and there was a grand finale where the whole town was illuminated with electric light in a triumphal arch of fire. The wedding presents were rare and consisted of a large fortune.

=== Earl of Arundel ===
The Norfolks had one son:

- Philip Joseph Mary Fitzalan-Howard, Earl of Arundel and Surrey (7 September 1879 – 8 July 1902)

Their son was born with severe physical and intellectual disabilities, and "All the resources of medical science were applied on behalf of the affected infant, but only with partial effect".

When his death was announced at age 22, it was reported that "he had never grown up, remaining all his life a boy, with a sweet face, half-blind, blond, with almost albino-like fairness, and suffering from a general failure of nervous power." His parents exhausted all financial and spiritual efforts to seek medical and rehabilitative help for him. After the Duchess's death, her sister-in-law, Lady Mary Adeliza Fitzalan-Howard, moved in to become his carer. His father built a large house in Wimbledon, where he was able to spend two hours a day with his son while the House of Lords was in session. Near the end of his life, the Earl was able to ride a tricycle for long periods around the grounds.

== Philanthrophy ==
The Duchess was a devout Catholic, and her generous financial contributions enabled the construction of a noble funerary chapel, Chapel of the Seven Dolours, dedicated to the Mother of Sorrows at the Brompton Oratory. A plaque commemorating the Norfolk's contribution is mounted above the left confessional.

The Duchess was inspired to build the Convent of Poor Clares in Crossbush, Arundel. She funded the construction of the convent and the church, and the first group of nuns, eight choir sisters and two externs, arrived in September 1886 from Notting Hill. It was her last major project. After her death, the convent was extended and improved by her husband.

== Death ==
The Duchess died at the age of 33 on 11 April 1887, after a "long and latterly painful illness" from Bright's disease. She is buried in the Fitzalan Chapel in Arundel.
