= John, King of England =

King of England from 1199 to 1216

John
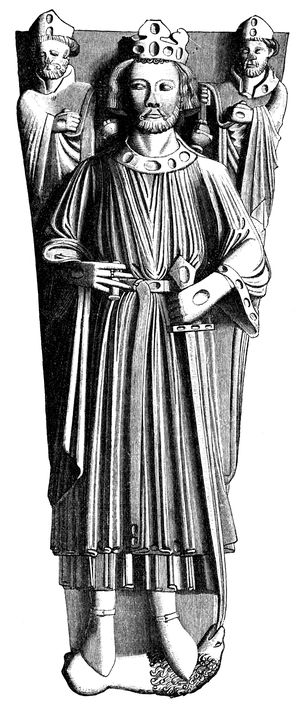
- Tomb effigy, Worcester Cathedral

King of England
- Reign: 1199–1216
- Coronation: 27 May 1199
- Predecessor: Richard I
- Successor: Henry III
- Born: Christmastide 1166/7; England
- Died: 19 October 1216 (aged 49); Newark Castle, Nottinghamshire, England
- Burial: Worcester Cathedral, England
- Spouses: Isabella, Countess of Gloucester (m. 1189; ann. 1199) Isabella, Countess of Angoulême (m. 1200)
- Issue Detail: Henry III, King of England; Richard, King of the Romans; Joan, Queen of Scotland; Isabella, Holy Roman Empress; Eleanor, Countess of Pembroke; Illegitimate: Richard FitzRoy; Joan, Lady of Wales
- House: Plantagenet-Angevin (Note: Historians are divided in their use of the terms Plantagenet and Angevin in regard to Henry II and his children. Some class Henry II to be the first Plantagenet king of England; others refer to Henry II, Richard I, and John as the Angevin dynasty, and consider Henry III to be the first Plantagenet ruler.)
- Father: Henry II of England
- Mother: Eleanor of Aquitaine

John (Christmastide 1166/7 – 19 October 1216) was King of England from 1199 until his death in 1216. He lost the Duchy of Normandy and most of his other French lands to King Philip II of France, resulting in the collapse of the Angevin Empire and contributing to the subsequent growth in power of the French Capetian dynasty during the 13th century. The baronial revolt at the end of John's reign led to the sealing of Magna Carta, a document considered a foundational milestone in English and later British constitutional history.

John was the youngest son of King Henry II of England and Duchess Eleanor of Aquitaine. He was nicknamed John Lackland (Norman: Jean sans Terre, lit. 'John without land') because, as a younger son, he was not expected to inherit significant lands. He became Henry's favourite child after Henry faced a failed revolt from John's older brothers, Henry the Young King, Richard, and Geoffrey. Henry II appointed John Lord of Ireland in 1177 and gave him lands in England and on the continent. During the reign of his brother Richard I, John unsuccessfully attempted a rebellion against Richard's administrators while the King was participating in the Third Crusade, but he was proclaimed king after Richard died in 1199. Philip II of France agreed to recognise John's possession of the continental Angevin lands at the peace treaty of Le Goulet in 1200.

When war with France broke out again in 1202, John achieved early victories, but shortages of military resources and his treatment of Norman, Breton, and Anjou nobles resulted in the collapse of his empire in northern France in 1204. He spent much of the next decade attempting to regain these lands, raising huge revenues, reforming his armed forces and rebuilding continental alliances. His judicial reforms had a lasting effect on the English common law system, as well as providing an additional source of revenue. His dispute with Pope Innocent III over the election of Stephen Langton as Archbishop of Canterbury led Innocent to ban church services in England from 1208 until 1214 and excommunicate John from 1209 until 1213. John's attempt to defeat Philip in 1214 failed because of the French victory over John's allies at the Battle of Bouvines. When he returned to England, John faced a rebellion by many of his barons, who were unhappy with his fiscal policies and his treatment of powerful English nobles. John and the barons agreed to Magna Carta as a peace treaty in 1215. However, neither side complied with its conditions. Civil war erupted shortly afterwards, with the barons aided by Philip's son Louis, and soon descended into a stalemate. Amid the civil war, John died of dysentery in eastern England in late 1216; supporters of his son Henry III went on to achieve victory over Louis and the rebel barons the following year.

Contemporary chroniclers were mostly critical of John's performance as king, and his reign has since been the subject of significant debate and periodic revision by historians from the 16th century onwards. Historian Jim Bradbury has summarised the current historical opinion of John's positive qualities, observing that John is today usually considered a "hard-working administrator, an able man, an able general". Nonetheless, modern historians agree that he also had many faults as king, including what historian Ralph Turner describes as "distasteful, even dangerous personality traits", such as pettiness, spitefulness, and cruelty. These negative qualities provided extensive material for fiction writers in the Victorian era, and John remains a recurring character within Western popular culture, primarily as a villain in Robin Hood folklore.

== Early life (1166–1189) ==
=== Childhood and the Angevin inheritance ===
John was born in England around Christmastide in 1166 or 1167; the precise date is a subject of debate among historians. His father, King Henry II of England, had inherited significant territories along the Atlantic seaboard—Anjou, Normandy and England—and expanded his possessions by exercising his ducal claim over Brittany. John's mother was Eleanor, the powerful duchess of Aquitaine, who had a tenuous claim to Toulouse and Auvergne in southern France and was the former wife of King Louis VII of France. The territories of Henry and Eleanor formed the Angevin Empire, named after Henry's paternal title as Count of Anjou and, more specifically, its seat in Angers. (Note: The term Angevin Empire originates with Victorian historian Kate Norgate.) The Empire, however, was inherently fragile: although all the lands owed allegiance to Henry, the disparate parts each had their own histories, traditions and governance structures. As one moved south through Anjou and Aquitaine, the extent of Henry's power in the provinces diminished considerably, scarcely resembling the modern concept of an empire at all. Some of the traditional ties between parts of the empire such as Normandy and England were slowly dissolving over time. The future of the empire upon Henry's eventual death was not secure: although the custom of primogeniture, under which an eldest son would inherit all his father's lands, was slowly becoming more widespread across Europe, it was less popular amongst the Norman kings of England. Most believed that Henry would divide the empire, giving each son a substantial portion, and hoping that his children would continue to work together as allies after his death. To complicate matters, much of the Angevin empire was held by Henry only as a vassal of the king of France of the rival line of the House of Capet. Henry had often allied himself with the Holy Roman Emperor against France, making the feudal relationship even more challenging.

Shortly after his birth, John was passed from Eleanor into the care of a wet nurse, a traditional practice for medieval noble families. Eleanor then left for Poitiers, the capital of Aquitaine, and sent John and his sister Joan north to Fontevrault Abbey. This may have been done with the aim of steering her youngest son, with no obvious inheritance, towards a future ecclesiastical career. Eleanor spent the next few years conspiring against Henry and neither parent played a part in John's very early life. John was probably, like his brothers, assigned a magister whilst he was at Fontevrault, a teacher charged with his early education and with managing the servants of his immediate household; he was later taught by Ranulf de Glanvill, a leading English administrator. John spent some time as a member of the household of his eldest living brother, Henry the Young King, where he probably received instruction in hunting and military skills.

John grew up to be around 5 ft 5 in (1.65 m) tall, relatively short, with a "powerful, barrel-chested body" and dark red hair; he looked to contemporaries like an inhabitant of Poitou. John enjoyed reading and, unusually for the period, built up a travelling library of books. He enjoyed gambling, in particular at backgammon, and was an enthusiastic hunter, even by medieval standards. He liked music, although not songs. John would become a "connoisseur of jewels", building up a large collection, and became famous for his opulent clothes and also, according to French chroniclers, for his fondness for bad wine. As John grew up, he became known for sometimes being "genial, witty, generous and hospitable"; at other moments, he could be jealous, over-sensitive and prone to fits of rage, "biting and gnawing his fingers" in anger. (Note: Henry II also bit and gnawed his fingers; extreme rage is considered by many historians to be a trait of the Angevin kings.)

=== Early life ===
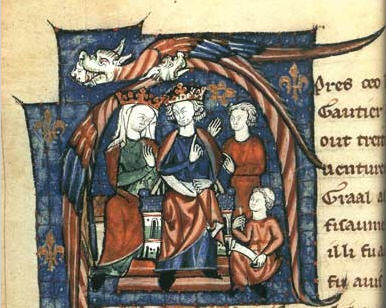
John's parents, Henry II and Eleanor, holding court

During John's early years, Henry attempted to resolve the question of his succession. Henry the Young King had been crowned King of England in 1170, but was not given any formal powers by his father; he was also promised Normandy and Anjou as part of his future inheritance. His brother Richard was to be appointed Count of Poitou with control of Aquitaine, whilst his brother Geoffrey was to become Duke of Brittany. At this time it seemed unlikely that John would ever inherit substantial lands, and he was jokingly nicknamed "Lackland" by his father.

Henry II wanted to secure the southern borders of Aquitaine and decided to betroth his youngest son to Alais, the daughter and heiress of Count Humbert III of Savoy. As part of this agreement John was promised the future inheritance of Savoy, Piedmont, Maurienne, and the other possessions of Count Humbert. For his part in the potential marriage alliance, Henry II transferred the castles of Chinon, Loudun and Mirebeau into John's name; as John was only five years old, his father would continue to control them for practical purposes. Henry the Young King was unimpressed by this; although he had yet to be granted control of any castles in his new kingdom, these were effectively his future property and had been given away without consultation. Alais made the trip over the Alps and joined Henry II's court, but she died before marrying John, which left the prince once again without an inheritance.

In 1173 John's elder brothers, backed by Eleanor, rose in revolt against Henry in the short-lived rebellion of 1173 to 1174. Growing irritated with his subordinate position to Henry II and increasingly worried that John might be given additional lands and castles at his expense, Henry the Young King travelled to Paris and allied himself with Louis VII. Eleanor, irritated by her husband's persistent interference in Aquitaine, encouraged Richard and Geoffrey to join their brother Henry in Paris. Henry II triumphed over the coalition of his sons, but was generous to them in the peace settlement agreed at Montlouis. Henry the Young King was allowed to travel widely in Europe with his own household of knights, Richard was given Aquitaine back, and Geoffrey was allowed to return to Brittany; only Eleanor was imprisoned for her role in the revolt.

John had spent the conflict travelling alongside his father, and was given widespread possessions across the Angevin empire as part of the Montlouis settlement; from then onwards, most observers regarded John as Henry II's favourite child, although he was the furthest removed in terms of the royal succession. Henry II began to find more lands for John, mostly at various nobles' expense. In 1175 he appropriated the estates of the late Earl of Cornwall and gave them to John. The following year, Henry disinherited the sisters of Isabella of Gloucester, contrary to legal custom, and betrothed John to the now extremely wealthy Isabella. In 1177, at the Council of Oxford, Henry dismissed William FitzAldelm as the Lord of Ireland and replaced him with the ten-year-old John.

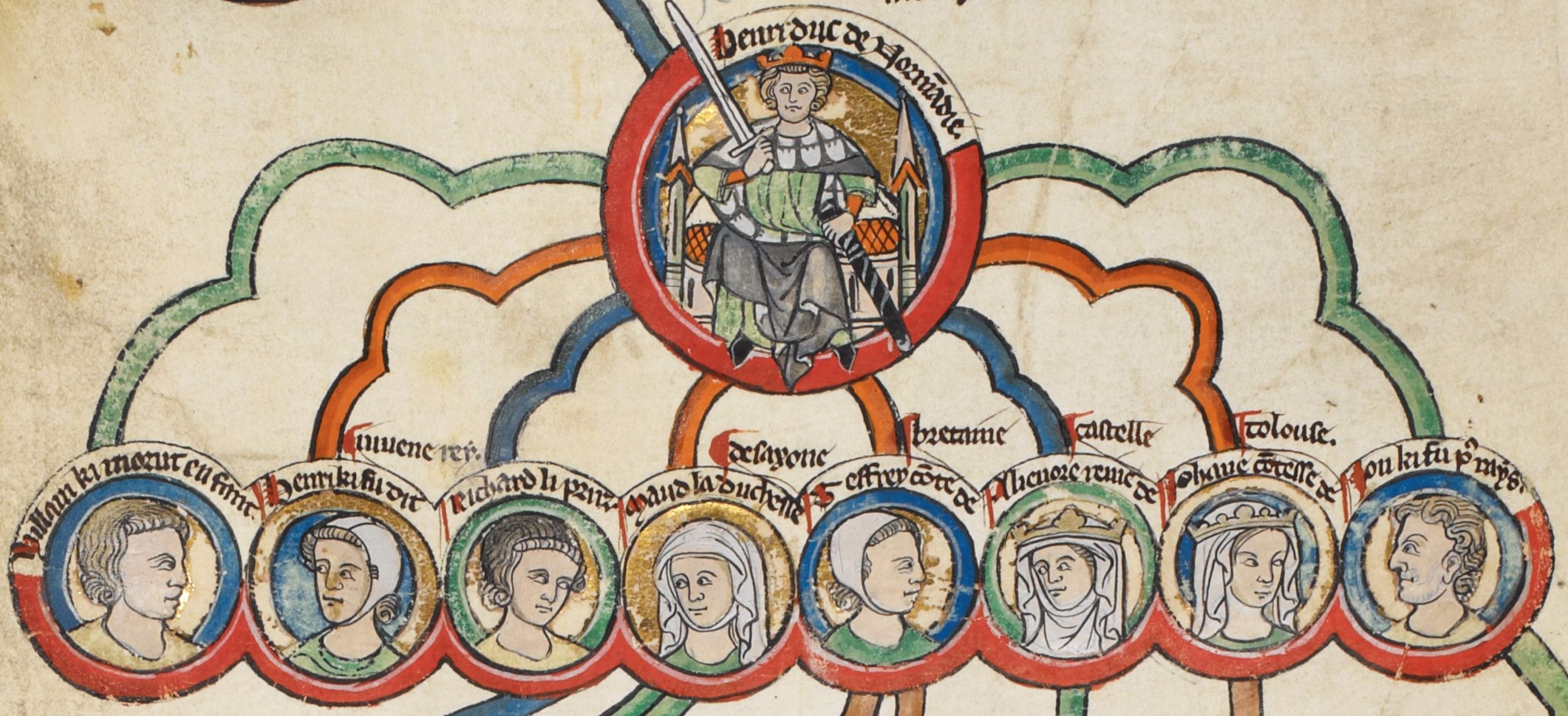
13th-century depiction of Henry II and his legitimate children, left to right: William, Henry, Richard, Matilda, Geoffrey, Eleanor, Joan and John

Henry the Young King fought a short war with his brother Richard in 1183 over the status of England, Normandy and Aquitaine. Henry II moved in support of Richard, and Henry the Young King died from dysentery at the end of the campaign. With his primary heir dead, Henry rearranged the plans for the succession: Richard was to be made King of England, albeit without any actual power until the death of his father; Geoffrey would retain Brittany; and John would now become the Duke of Aquitaine in place of Richard. Richard refused to give up Aquitaine; Henry II was furious and ordered John, with help from Geoffrey, to march south and retake the duchy by force. The two attacked the capital of Poitiers, and Richard responded by attacking Brittany. The war ended in stalemate and a tense family reconciliation in England at the end of 1184.

In 1185 John made his first visit to Ireland, accompanied by 300 knights and a team of administrators. Henry had tried to have John officially proclaimed King of Ireland, but Pope Lucius III would not agree. John's first period of rule in Ireland was not a success. Ireland had only recently been conquered by Anglo-Norman forces, and tensions were still rife between Henry II, the new settlers and the existing inhabitants. John infamously offended the local Irish rulers by making fun of their unfashionable long beards, failed to make allies amongst the Anglo-Norman settlers, began to lose ground militarily against the Irish and finally returned to England later in the year, blaming the viceroy, Hugh de Lacy, for the fiasco.

The problems amongst John's wider family continued to grow. His elder brother Geoffrey died during a tournament in 1186, leaving a posthumous son, Arthur, and an elder daughter, Eleanor. Geoffrey's death brought John slightly closer to the throne of England. The uncertainty about what would happen after Henry's death continued to grow; Richard was keen to join a new crusade and remained concerned that whilst he was away Henry would appoint John his formal successor.

Richard began discussions about a potential alliance with Philip II in Paris during 1187, and the next year Richard gave homage to Philip in exchange for support for a war against Henry. Richard and Philip fought a joint campaign against Henry, and by the summer of 1189 Henry made peace, promising Richard the succession. John initially remained loyal to his father, but changed sides once it appeared that Richard would win. Henry died shortly afterwards.

== Richard's reign (1189–1199) ==
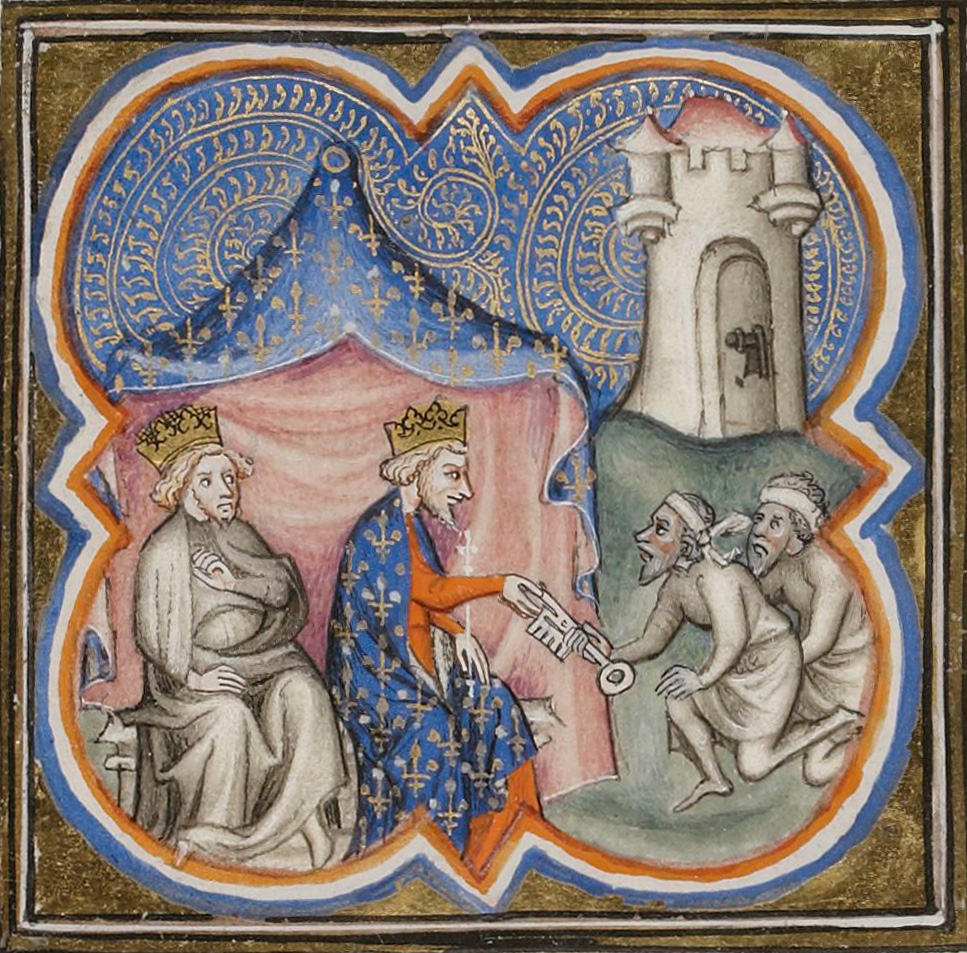
Richard I (left) and Philip II Augustus at Acre during the Third Crusade

When Richard became king in September 1189, he had already declared his intention of joining the Third Crusade. He set about raising the huge sums of money required for this expedition through the sale of lands, titles and appointments, and attempted to ensure that he would not face a revolt while away from his empire. John was made Count of Mortain, was married to the wealthy Isabella of Gloucester, and was given valuable lands in Lancaster and the counties of Cornwall, Derby, Devon, Dorset, Nottingham and Somerset, all with the aim of buying his loyalty to Richard whilst the King was on crusade. Richard retained royal control of key castles in these counties, thereby preventing John from accumulating too much military and political power. The King named his four-year-old nephew Arthur as his heir. In return, John promised not to visit England for the next three years, thereby in theory giving Richard adequate time to conduct a successful crusade and return from the Levant without fear of John seizing power. Richard left political authority in England—the post of justiciar—jointly in the hands of Bishop Hugh de Puiset and William de Mandeville, 3rd Earl of Essex, and made William Longchamp, the Bishop of Ely, his chancellor. Mandeville immediately died, and Longchamp took over as joint justiciar with Puiset, which would prove a less than satisfactory partnership. Eleanor, the queen mother, convinced Richard to allow John into England in his absence.

The political situation in England rapidly began to deteriorate. Longchamp refused to work with Puiset and became unpopular with the English nobility and clergy. John exploited this unpopularity to set himself up as an alternative ruler with his own royal court, complete with his own justiciar, chancellor and other royal posts, and was happy to be portrayed as an alternative regent, and possibly the next king. Armed conflict broke out between John and Longchamp, and by October 1191 Longchamp was isolated in the Tower of London with John in control of the city of London, thanks to promises John had made to the citizens in return for recognition as Richard's heir presumptive. At this point Walter of Coutances, the Archbishop of Rouen, returned to England, having been sent by Richard to restore order. John's position was undermined by Walter's relative popularity and by the news that Richard had married whilst in Cyprus, which presented the possibility that Richard would have legitimate children and heirs.

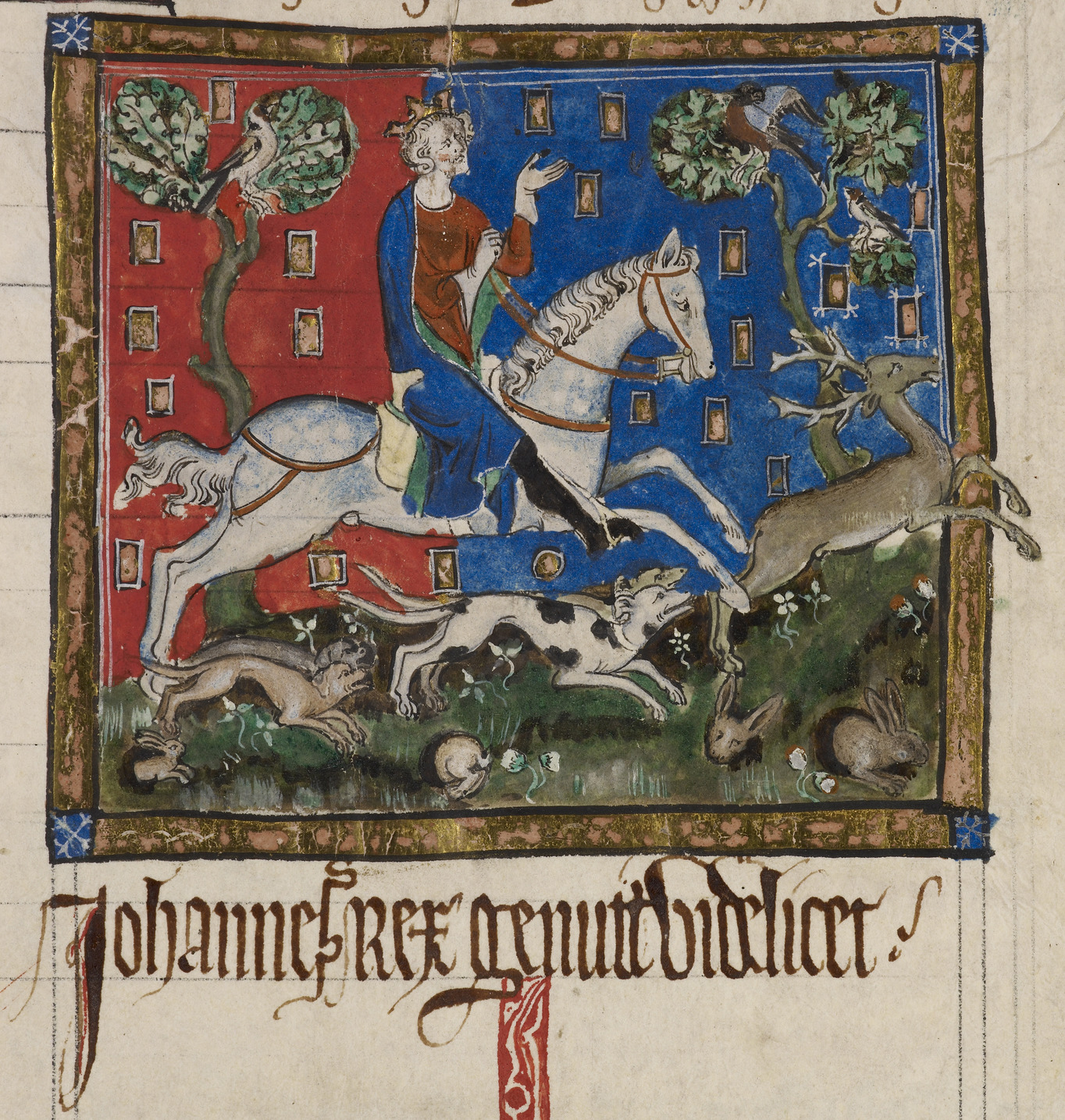
John on a stag hunt

The political turmoil continued. John began to explore an alliance with King Philip II of France, who had returned from the crusade in late 1191. John hoped to acquire Normandy, Anjou and the other lands in France held by Richard in exchange for allying himself with Philip. John was persuaded not to pursue an alliance by his mother. Longchamp, who had left England after Walter's intervention, now returned, and argued that he had been wrongly removed as justiciar. John intervened, suppressing Longchamp's claims in return for promises of support from the royal administration, including a reaffirmation of his position as heir to the throne. When Richard still did not return from the crusade, John began to assert that his brother was dead or otherwise permanently lost. Richard had in fact been captured shortly before Christmas 1192, while en route to England, by Duke Leopold V of Austria and was handed over to Emperor Henry VI, who held him for ransom. John seized the opportunity and went to Paris, where he formed an alliance with Philip. He agreed to set aside his wife, Isabella of Gloucester, and marry Philip's sister, Alys, in exchange for Philip's support. Fighting broke out in England between forces loyal to Richard and those being gathered by John. John's military position was weak and he agreed to a truce; in early 1194 the King finally returned to England, and John's remaining forces surrendered. John retreated to Normandy, where Richard finally found him later that year. Richard declared that John—despite being 27 years old—was merely "a child who has had evil counsellors" and forgave him, but removed his lands with the exception of Ireland.

For the remaining years of Richard's reign, John supported his brother on the continent, apparently loyally. Richard's policy on the continent was to attempt to regain through steady, limited campaigns the castles he had lost to Philip II whilst on crusade. He allied himself with the leaders of Flanders, Boulogne and the Holy Roman Empire to apply pressure on Philip from Germany. In 1195 John successfully conducted a sudden attack and siege of Évreux castle, and subsequently managed the defences of Normandy against Philip. The following year, John seized the town of Gamaches and led a raiding party within 50 miles (80 km) of Paris, capturing the Bishop of Beauvais. In return for this service, Richard withdrew his malevolentia (ill-will) towards John, restored him to the county of Gloucestershire and made him again Count of Mortain.

== Early reign (1199–1204) ==
=== Accession to the throne, 1199 ===
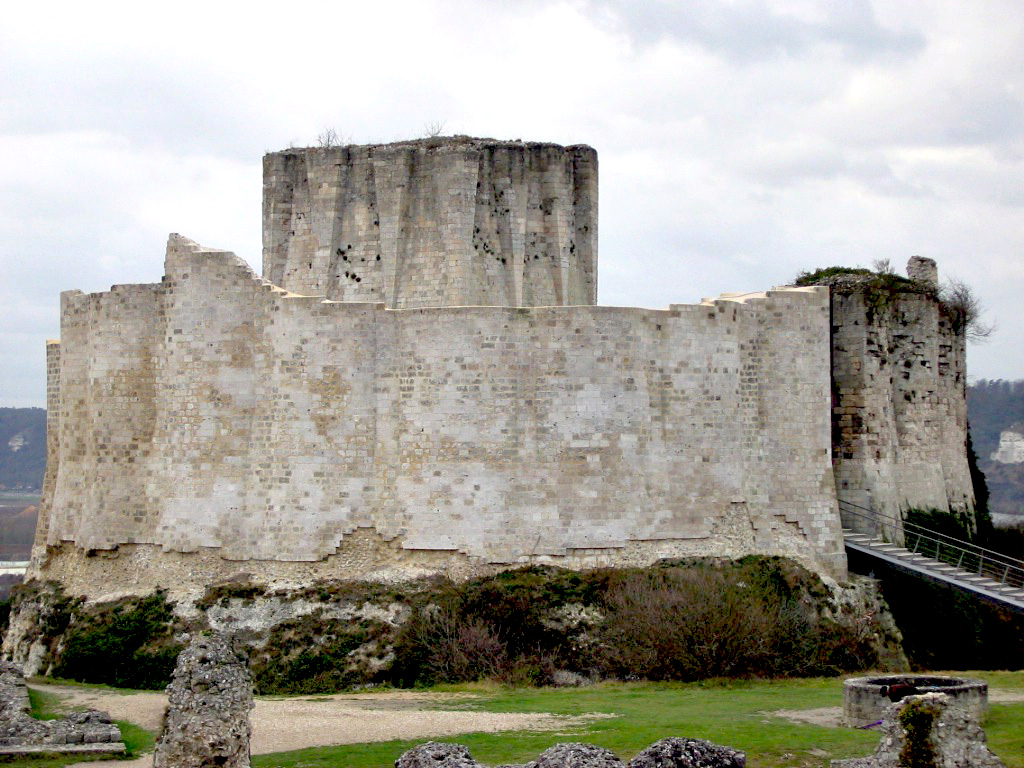
The donjon of Château Gaillard; the loss of the castle would prove devastating for John's military position in Normandy

After Richard's death on 6 April 1199 there were two potential claimants to the Angevin throne: John, whose claim rested on being the sole surviving son of Henry II, and young Arthur I of Brittany, who held a claim as the son of John's elder brother Geoffrey. Richard appears to have started to recognise John as his heir presumptive in the final years before his death, but the matter was not clear-cut and medieval law gave little guidance as to how the competing claims should be decided. With Norman law favouring John as the only surviving son of Henry II and Angevin law favouring Arthur as the only son of Henry's elder son, the matter rapidly became an open conflict. John was supported by the bulk of the English and Norman nobility and was crowned at Westminster Abbey, backed by his mother, Eleanor. Arthur was supported by the majority of the Breton, Maine and Anjou nobles and received the support of Philip II, who remained committed to breaking up the Angevin territories on the continent. With Arthur's army pressing up the Loire Valley towards Angers and Philip's forces moving down the valley towards Tours, John's continental empire was in danger of being cut in two.

Warfare in Normandy at the time was shaped by the defensive potential of castles and the increasing costs of conducting campaigns. The Norman frontiers had limited natural defences but were heavily reinforced with castles, such as Château Gaillard, at strategic points, built and maintained at considerable expense. It was difficult for a commander to advance far into fresh territory without having secured his lines of communication by capturing these fortifications, which slowed the progress of any attack. Armies of the period could be formed from either feudal or mercenary forces. Feudal levies could be raised only for a fixed length of time before they returned home, forcing an end to a campaign; mercenary forces, often called Brabançons after the Duchy of Brabant but actually recruited from across northern Europe, could operate all year long and provide a commander with more strategic options to pursue a campaign, but cost much more than equivalent feudal forces. As a result, commanders of the period were increasingly drawing on larger numbers of mercenaries.

After his coronation, John moved south into France with military forces and adopted a defensive posture along the eastern and southern Normandy borders. Both sides paused for desultory negotiations before the war recommenced; John's position was now stronger, thanks to confirmation that Baldwin IX of Flanders and Renaud of Boulogne had renewed the anti-French alliances they had previously agreed to with Richard. The powerful Anjou nobleman William des Roches was persuaded to switch sides from Arthur to John; suddenly the balance seemed to be tipping away from Philip and Arthur in favour of John. Neither side was keen to continue the conflict, and following a papal truce the two leaders met in January 1200 to negotiate possible terms for peace. From John's perspective, what then followed represented an opportunity to stabilise control over his continental possessions and produce a lasting peace with Philip in Paris. John and Philip negotiated the May 1200 Treaty of Le Goulet; by this treaty, Philip recognised John as the rightful heir to Richard in respect to his French possessions, temporarily abandoning the wider claims of his client, Arthur. (Note: Nonetheless, the treaty did offer Arthur certain protections as John's vassal.) John, in turn, abandoned Richard's former policy of containing Philip through alliances with Flanders and Boulogne, and accepted Philip's right as the legitimate feudal overlord of John's lands in France. John's policy earned him the disrespectful title of "John Softsword" from some English chroniclers, who contrasted his behaviour with his more aggressive brother, Richard.

=== Second marriage and consequences, 1200–1202 ===
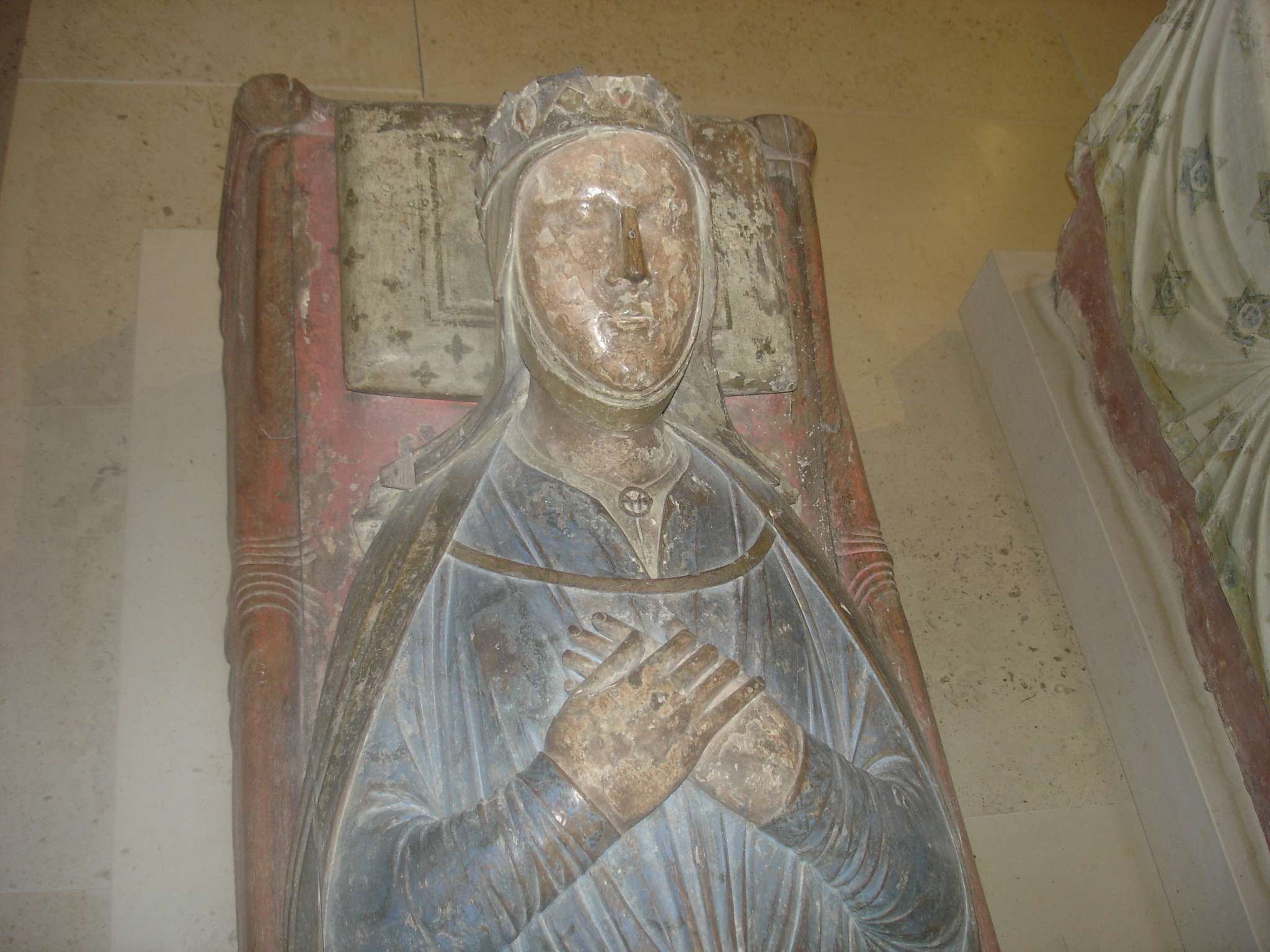
The effigy of Isabella of Angoulême, John's second wife, in Fontevraud Abbey in France

The new peace would last only two years; war recommenced in the aftermath of John's decision in August 1200 to marry Isabella of Angoulême. In order to remarry, John first needed to abandon his wife Isabella, Countess of Gloucester; the King accomplished this by arguing that he had failed to get the necessary papal dispensation to marry the Countess in the first place—as a cousin, John could not have legally wedded her without this. It remains unclear why John chose to marry Isabella of Angoulême. Contemporary chroniclers argued that John had fallen deeply in love with her, and John may have been motivated by desire for an apparently beautiful, if rather young, girl (Isabella of Angoulême was either 12 or 14 at the time of their marriage). On the other hand, the Angoumois lands that came with her were strategically vital to John. By marrying Isabella, he acquired a key land route between Poitou and Gascony, which significantly strengthened his grip on Aquitaine. (Note: Angoulême and Limoges were strategically located counties that had traditionally exercised a high degree of autonomy. They formed a key route for communications between Anjou and Gascony. Many of the details surrounding these counties during this period are uncertain and subject to historical debate, but it would appear that both the English and French dynasties had been attempting to apply influence and build alliances with the key families in the region for many years before the flash point in 1202.)

Isabella of Angoulême, however, was already engaged to Hugh IX of Lusignan, an important member of a key Poitou noble family and brother of Raoul I, Count of Eu, who possessed lands along the sensitive eastern Normandy border. Just as John stood to benefit strategically from marrying Isabella, so the marriage threatened the interests of the Lusignans, whose own lands currently provided the key route for royal goods and troops across Aquitaine. Rather than negotiating some form of compensation, John treated Hugh "with contempt"; this resulted in a Lusignan uprising that was promptly crushed by John, who also intervened to suppress Raoul in Normandy.

Although John was Count of Poitou and therefore the rightful feudal lord over the Lusignans, they could legitimately appeal John's actions in France to his own feudal lord, Philip. Hugh did exactly this in 1201 and Philip summoned John to attend court in Paris in 1202, citing the Le Goulet treaty to strengthen his case. John was unwilling to weaken his authority in western France in this way. He argued that he need not attend Philip's court because of his special status as the Duke of Normandy, who was exempt by feudal tradition from being called to the French court. Philip argued that he was summoning John not as the Duke of Normandy, but as Count of Poitou, which carried no such special status. When John still refused to come, Philip declared John in breach of his feudal responsibilities, reassigned all of John's lands that fell under the French crown to Arthur—with the exception of Normandy, which he took back for himself—and began a fresh war against John.

=== Loss of Normandy, 1202–1204 ===
John's successful 1202 campaign, which culminated in the victory of the battle of Mirebeau; red arrows indicate the movement of John's forces, blue those of Philip II's forces and light blue those of Philip's Breton and Lusignan allies

John initially adopted a defensive posture similar to that of 1199: avoiding open battle and carefully defending his key castles. John's operations became more chaotic as the campaign progressed, and Philip began to make steady progress in the east. John became aware in July that Arthur's forces were threatening his mother, Eleanor, at Mirebeau Castle. Accompanied by William de Roches, his seneschal in Anjou, he swung his mercenary army rapidly south to protect her. His forces caught Arthur by surprise and captured the entire rebel leadership at the battle of Mirebeau. With his southern flank weakening, Philip was forced to withdraw in the east and turn south himself to contain John's army.

John's position in France was considerably strengthened by the victory at Mirebeau, but John's treatment of his new prisoners and of his ally, William de Roches, quickly undermined these gains. De Roches was a powerful Anjou noble, but John largely ignored him, causing considerable offence, whilst the King kept the rebel leaders in such bad conditions that twenty-two of them died. At this time most of the regional nobility were closely linked through kinship, and this behaviour towards their relatives was regarded as unacceptable. William de Roches and others of John's regional allies in Anjou and Brittany deserted him in favour of Philip, and Brittany rose in revolt. John's financial situation was tenuous, once factors such as the comparative military costs of materiel and soldiers were taken into account. While Philip enjoyed a considerable, although not overwhelming, advantage of resources over John. (Note: This interpretation has been challenged by John Gillingham, whose minority view is that Richard, unlike John, successfully defended Normandy with a similar level of military resources.)

Further desertions of John's local allies at the beginning of 1203 steadily reduced his freedom to manoeuvre in the region. He attempted to convince Pope Innocent III to intervene in the conflict, but Innocent's efforts were unsuccessful. As the situation became worse for John, he appears to have decided to have Arthur killed, with the aim of removing a potential rival and to undermine the rebel forces in Brittany. Arthur had initially been imprisoned at Falaise and was then moved to Rouen. After this, Arthur's fate remains uncertain, but modern historians believe he was murdered by John. The annals of Margam Abbey suggest that "John had captured Arthur and kept him alive in prison for some time in the castle of Rouen ... when John was drunk he slew Arthur with his own hand and tying a heavy stone to the body cast it into the Seine." (Note: Although all modern biographers of John believe that he had his rival, Arthur, killed, the details of the Margam Abbey account can be questioned; as Frank McLynn points out, the Welsh monks appear "curiously well-informed" about the details of the incident in France.) Rumours of the manner of Arthur's death further reduced support for John across the region. Arthur's sister, Eleanor, who had also been captured at Mirebeau, was kept imprisoned by John for many years, albeit in relatively good conditions.

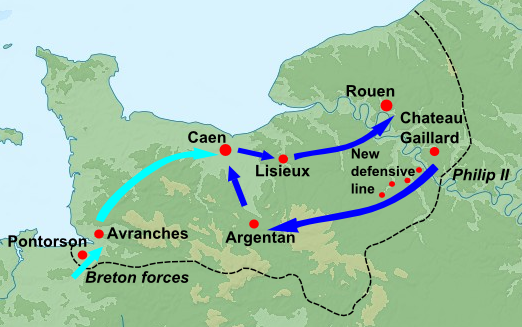
Phillip II's successful invasion of Normandy in 1204; blue arrows indicate the movement of Philip II's forces and light blue Philip's Breton allies

In late 1203, John attempted to relieve Château Gaillard, which although besieged by Philip was guarding the eastern flank of Normandy. John attempted a synchronised operation involving land-based and water-borne forces, considered by most historians today to have been imaginative in conception, but overly complex for forces of the period to have carried out successfully. John's relief operation was blocked by Philip's forces, and John turned back to Brittany in an attempt to draw Philip away from eastern Normandy. John successfully devastated much of Brittany, but did not deflect Philip's main thrust into the east of Normandy.

Opinions vary amongst historians as to the military skill shown by John during this campaign, with most recent historians arguing that his performance was passable, although not impressive. (Note: For positive interpretations of John's military skills in the campaign see Kate Norgate, who argues that John's attempt to relieve Château Gaillard was a "masterpiece of ingenuity"; Ralph Turner terms his performance as a general "capable"; Lewis Warren places the blame on John's inability to inspire loyalty amongst the local nobles, rather than a simple lack of military skill. Frank McLynn is more damning, describing the military aspects of the campaign as a "disastrous failure".) John's situation began to deteriorate rapidly. The eastern border region of Normandy had been extensively cultivated by Philip and his predecessors for several years, whilst Angevin authority in the south had been undermined by Richard's giving away of various key castles some years before. His use of routier mercenaries in the central regions had rapidly eaten away his remaining support in this area too, which set the stage for a sudden collapse of Angevin power. (Note: David Carpenter provides an accessible summary of Power's argument on the collapse of Normandy.) John retreated back across the Channel in December, sending orders for the establishment of a fresh defensive line to the west of Chateau Gaillard. In March 1204, Gaillard fell. John's mother Eleanor died the following month. This was not just a personal blow for John, but threatened to unravel the widespread Angevin alliances across the far south of France. Philip moved south around the new defensive line and struck upwards at the heart of the Duchy, now facing little resistance. By August, Philip had taken Normandy and advanced south to occupy Anjou and Poitou as well. John's only remaining possession on the Continent was now the Duchy of Aquitaine.

== John as king ==
=== Kingship and royal administration ===
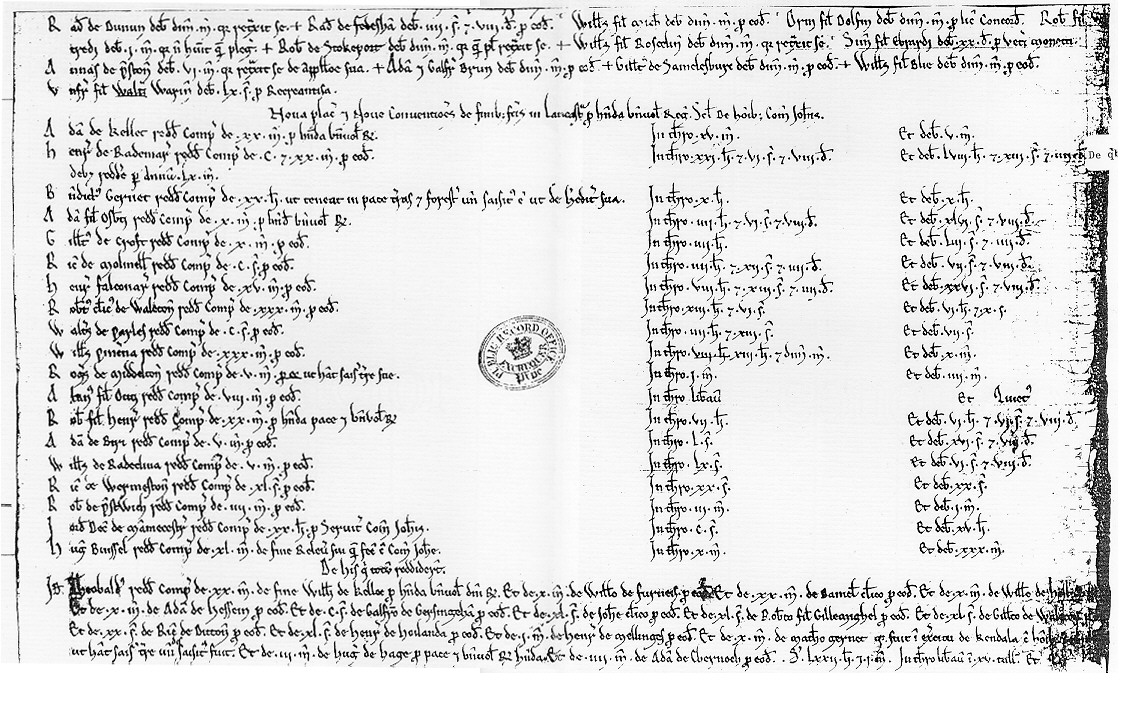
A pipe roll, part of the increasingly sophisticated system of royal governance at the turn of the 13th century

The nature of government under the Angevin monarchs was ill-defined and uncertain. John's predecessors had ruled using the principle of vis et voluntas ("force and will"), taking executive and sometimes arbitrary decisions, often justified on the basis that a king was above the law. Both Henry II and Richard had argued that kings possessed a quality of "divine majesty"; John continued this trend and claimed an "almost imperial status" for himself as ruler. During the 12th century, there were contrary opinions expressed about the nature of kingship, and many contemporary writers believed that monarchs should rule in accordance with the custom and the law, and take counsel of the leading members of the realm. There was as yet no model for what should happen if a king refused to do so. Despite his claim to unique authority within England, John would sometimes justify his actions on the basis that he had taken council with the barons. Modern historians remain divided as to whether John had a case of "royal schizophrenia" in his approach to government, or if his actions merely reflected the complex model of Angevin kingship in the early 13th century.

John inherited a sophisticated system of administration in England, with a range of royal agents answering to the Royal Household: the Chancery kept written records and communications; the Treasury and the Exchequer dealt with income and expenditure respectively; and various judges were deployed to deliver justice around the kingdom. Thanks to the efforts of men like Hubert Walter, this trend towards improved record keeping continued into his reign. Like previous kings, John managed a peripatetic court that travelled around the kingdom, dealing with both local and national matters as he went. John was very active in the administration of England and was involved in every aspect of government. In part he was following in the tradition of Henry I and Henry II, but by the 13th century the volume of administrative work had greatly increased, which put much more pressure on a king who wished to rule in this style. John was in England for much longer periods than his predecessors, which made his rule more personal than that of previous kings, particularly in previously ignored areas such as the north.

The administration of justice was of particular importance to John. Several new processes had been introduced to English law under Henry II, including novel disseisin and mort d'ancestor. These processes meant the royal courts had a more significant role in local law cases, which had previously been dealt with only by regional or local lords. John increased the professionalism of local sergeants and bailiffs, and extended the system of coroners first introduced by Hubert Walter in 1194, creating a new class of borough coroners. The King worked extremely hard to ensure that this system operated well, through judges he had appointed, by fostering legal specialists and expertise, and by intervening in cases himself. He continued to try relatively minor cases, even during military crises. Viewed positively, Lewis Warren considers that John discharged "his royal duty of providing justice ... with a zeal and a tirelessness to which the English common law is greatly endebted". Seen more critically, John may have been motivated by the potential of the royal legal process to raise fees, rather than a desire to deliver simple justice; his legal system also applied only to free men, rather than to all of the population. Nonetheless, these changes were popular with many free tenants, who acquired a more reliable legal system that could bypass the barons, against whom such cases were often brought. John's reforms were less popular with the barons themselves, especially as they remained subject to arbitrary and frequently vindictive royal justice.

=== Economy ===
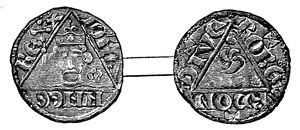
A silver King John penny, amongst the first struck in Dublin

One of John's principal challenges was acquiring the large sums of money needed for his proposed campaigns to reclaim Normandy. The Angevin kings had three main sources of income available to them, namely revenue from their personal lands, or demesne; money raised through their rights as a feudal lord; and revenue from taxation. Revenue from the royal demesne was inflexible and had been diminishing slowly since the Norman Conquest. Matters were not helped by Richard's sale of many royal properties in 1189, and taxation played a much smaller role in royal income than in later centuries. English kings had widespread feudal rights which could be used to generate income, including the scutage system, in which feudal military service was avoided by a cash payment to the King. He derived income from fines, court fees and the sale of charters and other privileges. John intensified his efforts to maximise all possible sources of income, to the extent that he has been described as "avaricious, miserly, extortionate and moneyminded". He also used revenue generation as a way of exerting political control over the barons: debts owed to the crown by the King's favoured supporters might be forgiven; collection of those owed by enemies was more stringently enforced.

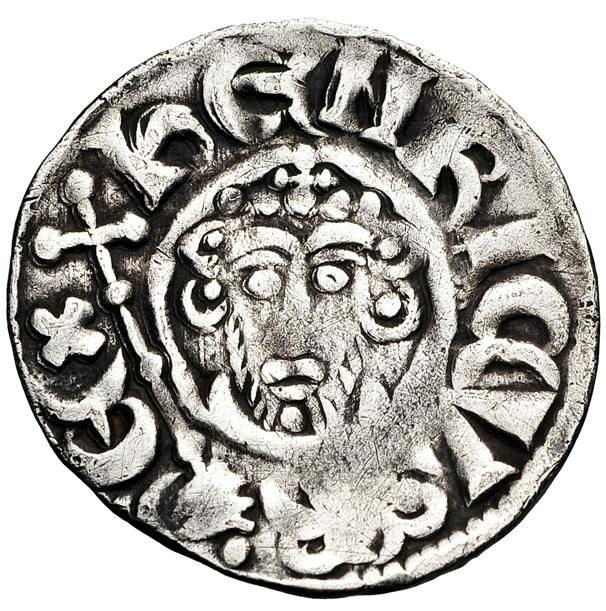
A silver King John penny

The result was a sequence of innovative but unpopular financial measures. (Note: The degree to which John was a genuine innovator in financial matters, as opposed to simply embracing expediency, has been contested. Frank Barlow, for example, argues that he was exercising a policy of expediency rather than genuine reform.) John levied scutage payments eleven times in his seventeen years as king, as compared to eleven times in total during the reign of the preceding three monarchs. In many cases these were levied in the absence of any actual military campaign, which ran counter to the original idea that scutage was an alternative to actual military service. John maximised his right to demand relief payments when estates and castles were inherited, sometimes charging enormous sums, beyond barons' abilities to pay. Building on the successful sale of sheriff appointments in 1194, the King initiated a new round of appointments, with the new incumbents making back their investment through increased fines and penalties, particularly in the forests. Another innovation of Richard's, increased charges levied on widows who wished to remain single, was expanded under John. John continued to sell charters for new towns, including the planned town of Liverpool, and charters were sold for markets across the kingdom and in Gascony. (Note: One consequence of this was an expansion of the wine trade with the Continent. In 1203, the citizens and merchants of Bordeaux were exempted from the Grande Coutume, which was the principal tax on their exports. In exchange, the regions of Bordeaux, Bayonne and Dax pledged support against the French Crown. The unblocked ports gave Gascon merchants open access to the English wine market for the first time. The following year, John granted the same exemptions to La Rochelle and Poitou.) The King introduced new taxes and extended existing ones. The Jews, who held a vulnerable position in medieval England, protected only by the King, were subject to huge taxes; £44,000 was extracted from the community by the tallage of 1210; much of it was passed on to the Christian debtors of Jewish moneylenders. (Note: Medieval financial figures have no easy contemporary equivalent, due to the different role of money in the economy.) John created a new tax on income and movable goods in 1207—effectively a version of a modern income tax—that produced £60,000; he created a new set of import and export duties payable directly to the Crown. He found that these measures enabled him to raise further resources through the confiscation of the lands of barons who could not pay or refused to pay.

At the start of John's reign there was a sudden change in prices, as bad harvests and high demand for food resulted in much higher prices for grain and animals. This inflationary pressure was to continue for the rest of the 13th century and had long-term economic consequences for England. The resulting social pressures were complicated by bursts of deflation that resulted from John's military campaigns. It was usual at the time for the King to collect taxes in silver, which was then re-minted into new coins; these coins would then be put in barrels and sent to royal castles around the country, to be used to hire mercenaries or to meet other costs. At those times when John was preparing for campaigns in Normandy, for example, huge quantities of silver had to be withdrawn from the economy and stored for months, which unintentionally resulted in periods during which silver coins were simply hard to come by, commercial credit difficult to acquire and deflationary pressure placed on the economy. The result was political unrest across the country. John attempted to address some of the problems with the English currency in 1204 and 1205 by carrying out a radical overhaul of the coinage, improving its quality and consistency.

=== Royal household and ira et malevolentia ===
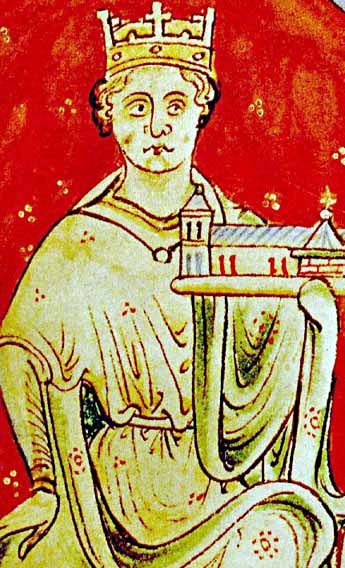
King John presenting a church, painted c. 1250–1259 by Matthew Paris in his Historia Anglorum

John's royal household was based around several groups of followers. One group was the familiares regis, his immediate friends and knights who travelled around the country with him. They also played an important role in organising and leading military campaigns. Another section of royal followers were the curia regis; these curiales were the senior officials and agents of the King and were essential to his day-to-day rule. Being a member of these inner circles brought huge advantages, as it was easier to gain favours from the King, file lawsuits, marry a wealthy heiress or have one's debts remitted. By the time of Henry II, these posts were increasingly being filled by "new men" from outside the normal ranks of the barons. This intensified under John's rule, with many lesser nobles arriving from the continent to take up positions at court; many were mercenary leaders from Poitou. These men included soldiers who would become infamous in England for their uncivilised behaviour, including Falkes de Breauté, Gérard d'Athée, Engelard de Cigogné, and Philip Marc. Many barons perceived the King's household as what Ralph Turner has characterised as a "narrow clique enjoying royal favour at barons' expense" staffed by men of lesser status.

This trend for the King to rely on his own men at the expense of the barons was exacerbated by the tradition of Angevin royal ira et malevolentia ("anger and ill-will") and John's own personality. From Henry II onwards, ira et malevolentia had come to describe the right of the King to express his anger and displeasure at particular barons or clergy, building on the Norman concept of malevolentia—royal ill-will. In the Norman period, suffering the King's ill-will meant difficulties in obtaining grants, honours or petitions; Henry II had infamously expressed his fury and ill-will towards Thomas Becket, which ultimately resulted in Becket's death. John now had the additional ability to "cripple his vassals" on a significant scale using his new economic and judicial measures, which made the threat of royal anger all the more serious.

John was deeply suspicious of the barons, particularly those with sufficient power and wealth to potentially challenge him. Numerous barons were subjected to his malevolentia, even including the famous knight William Marshal, 1st Earl of Pembroke, normally held up as a model of utter loyalty. The most infamous case, which went beyond anything considered acceptable at the time, was that of the powerful William de Braose, 4th Lord of Bramber, who held lands in Ireland. De Braose was subjected to punitive demands for money, and when he refused to pay a huge sum of 40,000 marks (equivalent to £26,666 at the time), (Note: Both the mark and the pound sterling were accountancy terms in this period; a mark was worth around two-thirds of a pound.) his wife, Maud, and one of their sons were imprisoned by John, which resulted in their deaths. De Braose died in exile in 1211, and his grandsons remained in prison until 1218. John's suspicions and jealousies meant that he rarely enjoyed good relationships with even the leading loyalist barons.

=== Personal life ===
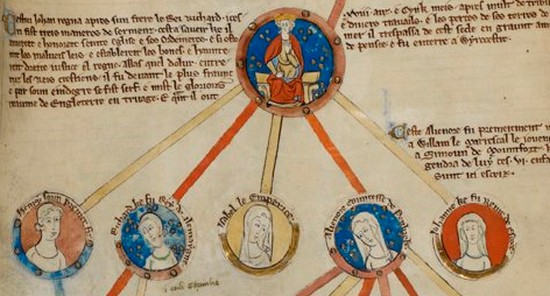
A 13th-century depiction of John and his legitimate children, (l to r) Henry, Richard, Isabella, Eleanor and Joan

John's personal life greatly affected his reign. Contemporary chroniclers state that John was sinfully lustful and lacking in piety. It was common for kings and nobles of the period to keep mistresses, but chroniclers complained that John's mistresses were married noblewomen, which was considered unacceptable. John had at least five children with mistresses during his first marriage, and two of those mistresses are known to have been noblewomen. John's sexual behaviour after his second marriage is less clear, however. None of his known illegitimate children were born after he remarried, and there is no actual documentary proof of adultery after that point, although John certainly had female friends amongst the court throughout the period. The specific accusations made against John during the baronial revolts are now generally considered to have been invented for the purposes of justifying the revolt; nonetheless, most of John's contemporaries seem to have held a poor opinion of his sexual behaviour. (Note: The most notable piece of evidence for any later royal affairs is the famous entry on the fine roll of Christmas 1204 involving Hugh de Neville's wife. This entry notes that de Neville's wife offered the King 200 chickens if she could spend a night with her husband, Hugh. This is conventionally interpreted as implying that she was having an affair with the King but in this case wished to have sex with her husband instead – thus the humorous fine. An alternative explanation is that she was tired of Hugh being sent away on royal service and the fine was a light-hearted way of convincing John to ensure that her husband remained at court for a night.)

The character of John's relationship with his second wife, Isabella of Angoulême, is unclear. John married Isabella whilst she was relatively young—her exact date of birth is uncertain, and estimates place her between at most 15 and more probably towards nine years old at the time of her marriage. (Note: These estimates are based on chronicler accounts, the date of Isabella's parents' marriage and on the date of birth of her first child.) Even by the standards of the time, she was married whilst very young. John did not provide a great deal of money for his wife's household and did not pass on much of the revenue from her lands, to the extent that historian Nicholas Vincent has described him as being "downright mean" towards Isabella. Vincent concluded that the marriage was not a particularly "amicable" one. Other aspects of their marriage suggest a closer, more positive relationship. Chroniclers recorded that John had a "mad infatuation" with Isabella, and certainly the King and Queen had conjugal relations between at least 1207 and 1215; they had five children. In contrast to Vincent, historian William Chester Jordan concludes that the pair were a "companionable couple" who had a successful marriage by the standards of the day.

John's lack of religious conviction has been noted by contemporary chroniclers and later historians, with some suspecting that he was at best impious, or even atheistic, a very serious issue at the time. Contemporary chroniclers catalogued his various anti-religious habits at length, including his failure to take communion, his blasphemous remarks, and his witty but scandalous jokes about church doctrine, including jokes about the implausibility of the Resurrection of Jesus. They commented on the paucity of John's charitable donations to the Church. Historian Frank McLynn argues that John's early years at Fontevrault, combined with his relatively advanced education, may have turned him against the church. Other historians have been more cautious in interpreting this material, noting that chroniclers also reported his personal interest in the life of St Wulfstan and his friendships with several senior clerics, most especially with Hugh of Lincoln, who was later declared a saint. Financial records show a normal royal household engaged in the usual feasts and pious observances—albeit with many records showing John's offerings to the poor to atone for routinely breaking church rules and guidance. The historian Lewis Warren has argued that the chronicler accounts were subject to considerable bias and the King was "at least conventionally devout", citing his pilgrimages and interest in religious scripture and commentaries.

== Later reign (1204–1214) ==
=== Continental policy ===
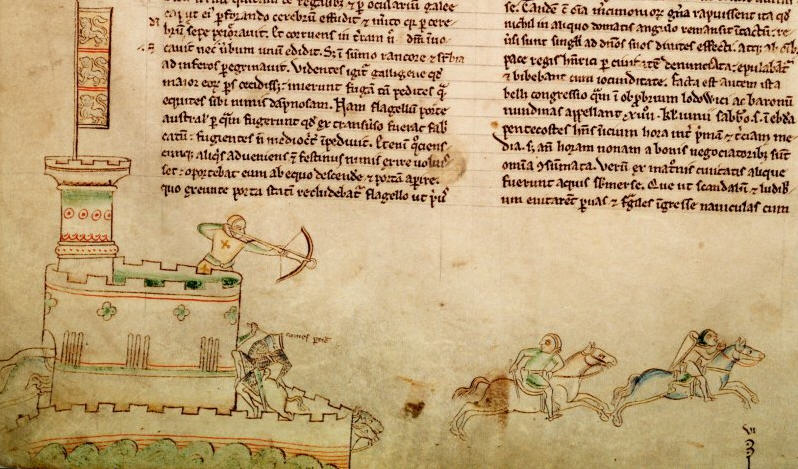
An early-13th-century drawing by Matthew Paris showing contemporary warfare, including the use of castles, crossbowmen and mounted knights

During the remainder of his reign, John focused on trying to retake Normandy. The available evidence suggests that he did not regard the loss of the Duchy as a permanent shift in Capetian power. Strategically, John faced several challenges: England itself had to be secured against possible French invasion, the sea-routes to Bordeaux needed to be secured following the loss of the land route to Aquitaine, and his remaining possessions in Aquitaine needed to be secured following the death of his mother, Eleanor, in April 1204. John's preferred plan was to use Poitou as a base of operations, advance up the Loire Valley to threaten Paris, pin down the French forces and break Philip's internal lines of communication before landing a maritime force in the Duchy itself. Ideally, this plan would benefit from the opening of a second front on Philip's eastern frontiers with Flanders and Boulogne—effectively a re-creation of Richard's old strategy of applying pressure from Germany. All of this would require a great deal of money and soldiers.

John spent much of 1205 securing England against a potential French invasion. As an emergency measure, he recreated a version of Henry II's Assize of Arms of 1181, with each shire creating a structure to mobilise local levies. When the threat of invasion faded, John formed a large military force in England intended for Poitou, and a large fleet with soldiers under his own command intended for Normandy. To achieve this, John reformed the English feudal contribution to his campaigns, creating a more flexible system under which only one knight in ten would actually be mobilised, but would be financially supported by the other nine; knights would serve for an indefinite period. John built up a strong team of engineers for siege warfare and a substantial force of professional crossbowmen. The King was supported by a team of leading barons with military expertise, including William Longespée, 3rd Earl of Salisbury, William the Marshal, Roger de Lacy and, until he fell from favour, the marcher lord William de Braose.

John had already begun to improve his Channel forces before the loss of Normandy and he rapidly built up further maritime capabilities after its collapse. Most of these ships were placed along the Cinque Ports, but Portsmouth was also enlarged. By the end of 1204 he had around 50 large galleys available; another 54 vessels were built between 1209 and 1212. William of Wrotham was appointed "keeper of the galleys", effectively John's chief admiral. Wrotham was responsible for fusing John's galleys, the ships of the Cinque Ports and pressed merchant vessels into a single operational fleet. John adopted recent improvements in ship design, including new large transport ships called buisses and removable forecastles for use in combat.

Baronial unrest in England prevented the departure of the planned 1205 expedition, and only a smaller force under William Longespée deployed to Poitou. In 1206 John departed for Poitou himself, but was forced to divert south to counter the invasion of Gascony by Alfonso VIII of Castile. After a successful campaign against Alfonso, John headed north again, taking the city of Angers. Philip moved south to meet John; the year's campaigning ended in stalemate and a two-year truce was made between the two rulers.

During the truce of 1206–1208, John focused on building up his financial and military resources in preparation for another attempt to recapture Normandy. John used some of this money to pay for new alliances on Philip's eastern frontiers, where the growth in Capetian power was beginning to concern France's neighbours. By 1212 John had successfully concluded alliances with his nephew Otto IV of Germany, a contender for the crown of Holy Roman Emperor, as well as with Renaud of Boulogne and Ferdinand of Flanders. The invasion plans for 1212 were postponed because of fresh English baronial unrest about service in Poitou. Philip seized the initiative in 1213, sending his elder son, Louis, to invade Flanders with the intention of next launching an invasion of England. John was forced to postpone his own invasion plans to counter this threat. He launched his new fleet to attack the French at the harbour of Damme. The attack was a success, destroying Philip's vessels and any chances of an invasion of England that year. John hoped to exploit this advantage by invading himself late in 1213, but baronial discontent again delayed his invasion plans until early 1214, in what was his final Continental campaign.

=== Scotland, Ireland and Wales ===
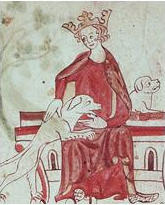
A 13th-century depiction of John with two hunting dogs

In the late 12th and early 13th centuries the border and political relationship between England and Scotland was disputed, with the kings of Scotland claiming parts of what is now northern England. Henry II had forced William the Lion to swear fealty to him at the Treaty of Falaise in 1174. This had been rescinded by Richard I in exchange for financial compensation in 1189, but the relationship remained uneasy. John began his reign by reasserting his sovereignty over the disputed northern counties. He refused William's request for the earldom of Northumbria, but did not intervene in Scotland itself and focused on his continental problems. The two kings maintained a friendly relationship, meeting in 1206 and 1207, until it was rumoured in 1209 that William was intending to ally himself with Philip II of France. John invaded Scotland and forced William to sign the Treaty of Norham, which gave John control of William's daughters and required a payment of £10,000. This effectively crippled William's power north of the border, and by 1212 John had to intervene militarily to support William against his internal rivals. (Note: William's son, Alexander II of Scotland, would later state that he had been betrothed in 1212 to John's daughter Joan. Current scholarship considers Alexander's claim unreliable.) John made no efforts to reinvigorate the Treaty of Falaise, though, and William and his son Alexander II of Scotland in turn remained independent kings, supported by, but not owing fealty to, John.

John remained Lord of Ireland throughout his reign. He drew on the country for resources to fight his war with Philip on the continent. Conflict continued in Ireland between the Anglo-Norman settlers and the indigenous Irish chieftains, with John manipulating both groups to expand his wealth and power in the country. During Richard's rule, John had successfully increased the size of his lands in Ireland, and he continued this policy as king. In 1210 the King crossed into Ireland with a large army to crush a rebellion by the Anglo-Norman lords; he reasserted his control of the country and used a new charter to order compliance with English laws and customs in Ireland. John stopped short of trying to actively enforce this charter on the native Irish kingdoms, but historian David Carpenter suspects that he might have done so, had the baronial conflict in England not intervened. Simmering tensions remained with the native Irish leaders even after John left for England.

Royal power in Wales was unevenly applied, with the country divided between the marcher lords along the borders, royal territories in Pembrokeshire and the more independent native Welsh lords of North Wales. John took a close interest in Wales and knew the country well, visiting every year between 1204 and 1211 and marrying his illegitimate daughter Joan to the Welsh prince Llywelyn the Great. The King used the marcher lords and the native Welsh to increase his own territory and power, striking a sequence of increasingly precise deals backed by royal military power with the Welsh rulers. A major royal expedition to enforce these agreements occurred in 1211, after Llywelyn attempted to exploit the instability caused by the removal of William de Braose, through the Welsh uprising of 1211. John's invasion, striking into the Welsh heartlands, was a military success. Llywelyn came to terms that included an expansion of John's power across much of Wales, albeit only temporarily.

=== Dispute with the Pope and excommunication ===
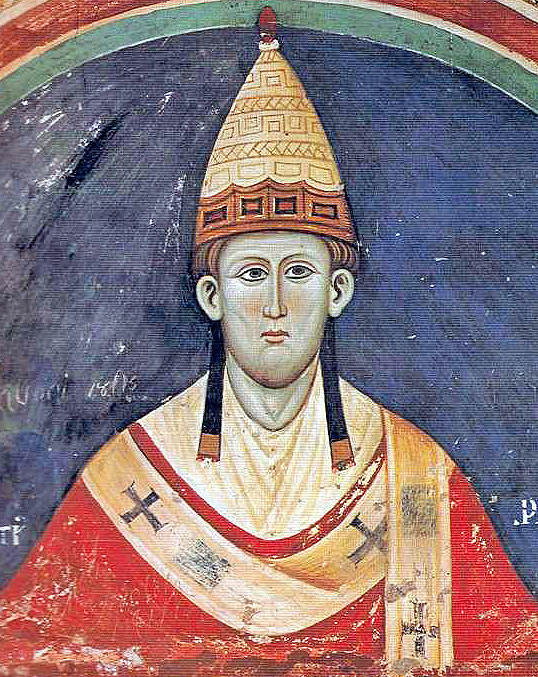
Pope Innocent III, who excommunicated John in 1209

When the Archbishop of Canterbury, Hubert Walter, died on 13 July 1205, John became involved in a dispute with Pope Innocent III that would lead to the King's excommunication. The Norman and Angevin kings had traditionally exercised a great deal of power over the church within their territories. From the 1040s onwards, however, successive popes had put forward a reforming message that emphasised the importance of the Church being "governed more coherently and more hierarchically from the centre" and established "its own sphere of authority and jurisdiction, separate from and independent of that of the lay ruler", in the words of historian Richard Huscroft. After the 1140s, these principles had been largely accepted within the English Church, albeit with an element of concern about centralising authority in Rome. These changes brought the customary rights of lay rulers such as John over ecclesiastical appointments into question. Pope Innocent was, according to historian Ralph Turner, an "ambitious and aggressive" religious leader, insistent on his rights and responsibilities within the church.

John wanted John de Gray, the Bishop of Norwich and one of his own supporters, to be appointed Archbishop of Canterbury, but the cathedral chapter for Canterbury Cathedral claimed the exclusive right to elect the Archbishop. They favoured Reginald, the chapter's sub-prior. To complicate matters, the bishops of the province of Canterbury also claimed the right to appoint the next archbishop. The chapter secretly elected Reginald and he travelled to Rome to be confirmed; the bishops challenged the appointment and the matter was taken before Innocent. John forced the Canterbury chapter to change their support to John de Gray, and a messenger was sent to Rome to inform the papacy of the new decision. Innocent disavowed both Reginald and John de Gray, and instead appointed his own candidate, Stephen Langton. John refused Innocent's request that he consent to Langton's appointment, but the Pope consecrated Langton anyway in June 1207.

John was incensed about what he perceived as an abrogation of his customary right as monarch to influence the election. He complained both about the choice of Langton as an individual, as John felt he was overly influenced by the Capetian court in Paris, and about the process as a whole. He barred Langton from entering England and seized the lands of the archbishopric and other papal possessions. Innocent set a commission in place to try to convince John to change his mind, but to no avail. Innocent then placed an interdict on England in March 1208, prohibiting clergy from conducting religious services, with the exception of baptisms for the young, and confessions and absolutions for the dying.

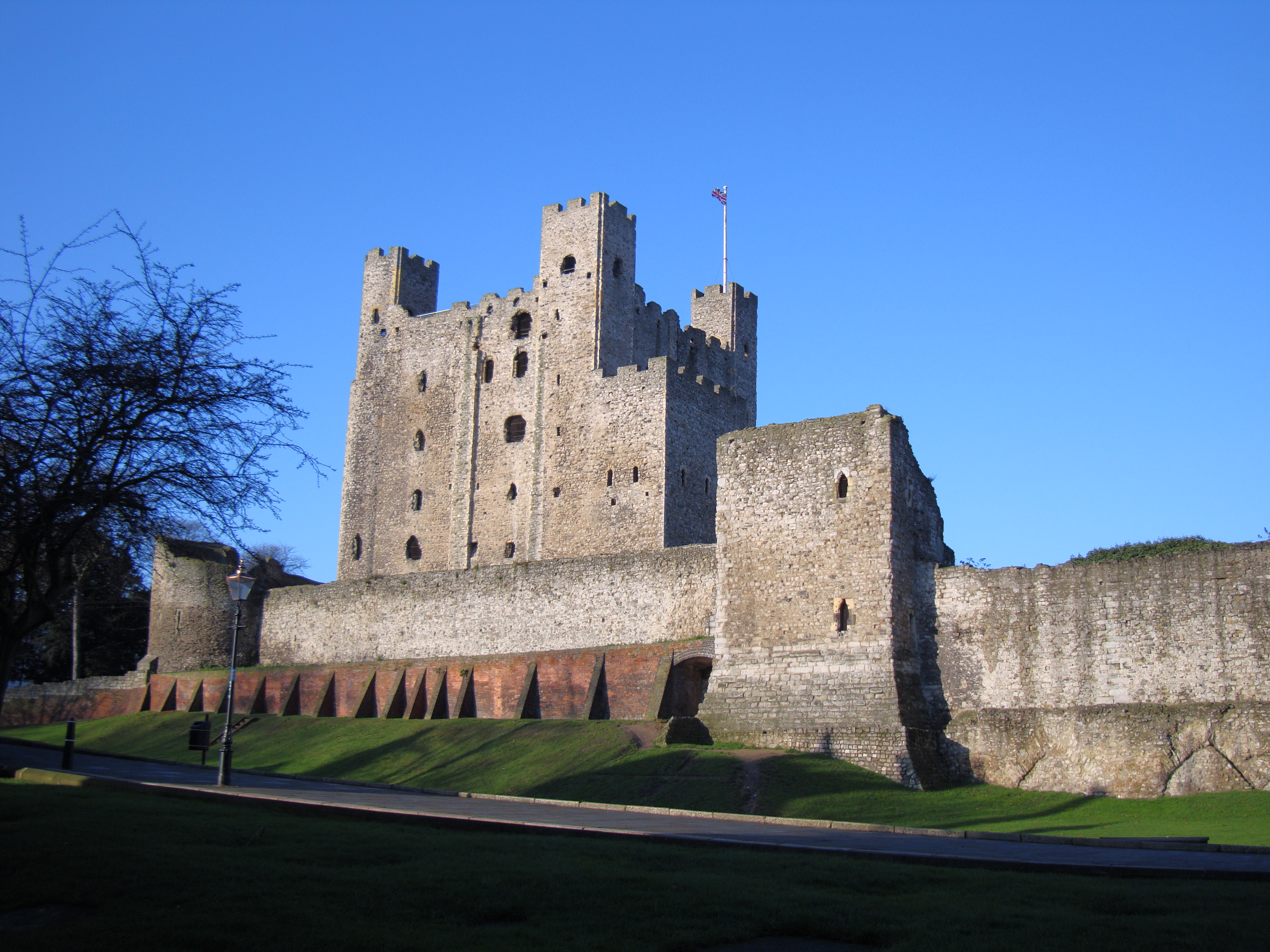
Rochester Castle in Kent, one of the many properties owned by the disputed archbishopric of Canterbury, and an important fortification in the final years of John's reign

John treated the interdict as "the equivalent of a papal declaration of war". He responded by attempting to punish Innocent personally and to drive a wedge between the English clergymen who might support John and those allying themselves firmly with the authorities in Rome. John seized the lands of the clergymen unwilling to conduct services, as well as estates linked to Innocent himself; he arrested the illicit concubines that many clerics kept during the period, releasing them only after the payment of fines; he seized the lands of members of the church who had fled England, and he promised protection for those willing to remain loyal to him. In many cases, individual institutions were able to negotiate terms for managing their own properties and keeping the produce of their estates. By 1209 the situation showed no signs of resolution, and Innocent threatened to excommunicate John if he did not acquiesce to Langton's appointment. When this threat failed, Innocent excommunicated the King in November 1209. Although theoretically a significant blow to John's legitimacy, this did not appear to worry the King greatly. Two of John's close allies, Emperor Otto IV and Count Raymond VI of Toulouse, had already suffered the same punishment themselves, and the significance of excommunication had been somewhat devalued. John simply tightened his existing measures and accrued significant sums from the income of vacant sees and abbeys. One 1213 estimate, for example, suggested the church had lost an estimated 100,000 marks (equivalent to ~£67,000 at the time) to John. Official figures suggest that around 14% of the annual income from the English church was being appropriated by John.

Innocent gave some dispensations as the crisis progressed. Monastic communities were allowed to celebrate Mass in private from 1209 onwards, and late in 1212 the Holy Viaticum for the dying was authorised. The rules on burials and lay access to churches appear to have been steadily circumvented, at least unofficially. Although the interdict was a burden to much of the population, it did not result in rebellion against John. By 1213, though, John was increasingly worried about the threat of a French invasion. Some contemporary chroniclers suggest that in January of that year, Philip II of France had been charged with deposing John on behalf of the papacy, although it appears that the Pope had merely prepared secret letters in case he needed to claim the credit if Philip successfully invaded England.

Under mounting political pressure, John finally negotiated terms for a reconciliation, and the papal terms for submission were accepted in the presence of the papal legate Pandulf Verraccio in May 1213 at the Templar Church at Dover. As part of the deal, John offered to surrender the Kingdom of England to the papacy for a feudal service of 1,000 marks (equivalent to ~£700 at the time) annually; 700 marks (~£500) for England and 300 marks (~£200) for Ireland, as well as compensation to the Church for any revenue lost during the crisis. The agreement was formalised in the Bulla Aurea, or Golden Bull. This resolution produced mixed responses. Although some chroniclers felt that John had been humiliated by the sequence of events, there was little public reaction. The Pope benefited from the resolution of his long-standing English problem, but John probably gained more, as Innocent became a firm supporter of John for the rest of his reign. Backing him in both domestic and continental policy issues. Innocent immediately turned against Philip, calling upon him to reject plans to invade England and to sue for peace. John paid some of the compensation money he had promised the Church, but he ceased making payments in late 1214, leaving two-thirds of the sum unpaid; Innocent appears to have conveniently forgotten this debt for the good of the wider relationship.

== Failure in France and the First Barons' War (1215–1216) ==
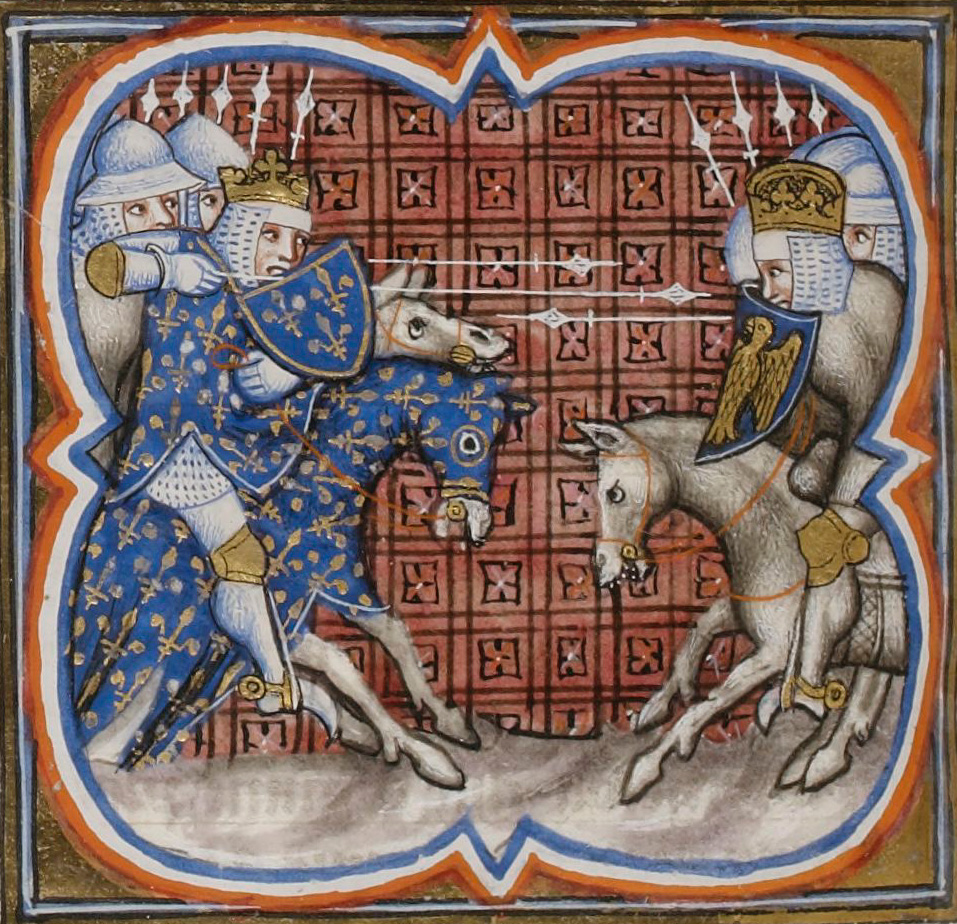
The French victory at the battle of Bouvines doomed John's plan to retake Normandy in 1214 and led to the First Barons' War.

=== Tensions and discontent ===
Tensions between John and the barons had been growing for several years, as demonstrated by the 1212 plot against the King. Many of the disaffected barons came from the north of England; that faction was often labelled by contemporaries and historians as "the Northerners". The northern barons rarely had any personal stake in the conflict in France, and many of them owed large sums of money to John; the revolt has been characterised as "a rebellion of the king's debtors". Many of John's military household joined the rebels, particularly amongst those that John had appointed to administrative roles across England; their local links and loyalties outweighed their personal loyalty to John. Tension also grew across North Wales, where opposition to the 1211 treaty between John and Llywelyn was turning into open conflict. For some the appointment of Peter des Roches as justiciar was an important factor, as he was considered an "abrasive foreigner" by many of the barons. The failure of John's French military campaign in 1214 was probably the final straw that precipitated the baronial uprising during John's final years as king; James Holt describes the path to civil war as "direct, short and unavoidable" following the defeat at Bouvines.

=== Failure of the 1214 French campaign ===
In 1214 John began his final campaign to reclaim Normandy from Philip. He was optimistic, as he had successfully built up alliances with Emperor Otto IV, Renaud of Boulogne and Ferdinand of Flanders. Moreover, he was enjoying papal favour and had successfully built up substantial funds to pay for the deployment of his experienced army. Nonetheless, when John left for Poitou in February 1214, many barons refused to provide military service; mercenary knights had to fill the gaps. John's plan was to split Philip's forces by pushing north-east from Poitou towards Paris, whilst Otto, Renaud and Ferdinand, supported by William Longespée, marched south-west from Flanders.

The first part of the campaign went well, with John outmanoeuvring the forces under the command of Prince Louis and retaking the county of Anjou by the end of June. John besieged the castle of Roche-au-Moine, a key stronghold, forcing Louis to give battle against John's larger army. The local Angevin nobles refused to advance with John; left at something of a disadvantage, John retreated back to La Rochelle. Shortly afterwards, King Philip won the hard-fought battle of Bouvines in the north against Otto and John's other allies, bringing an end to John's hopes of retaking Normandy. A peace agreement was signed in which John returned Anjou to Philip and paid him compensation; the truce was intended to last for six years. John arrived back in England in October.

=== Pre-war tensions and Magna Carta ===
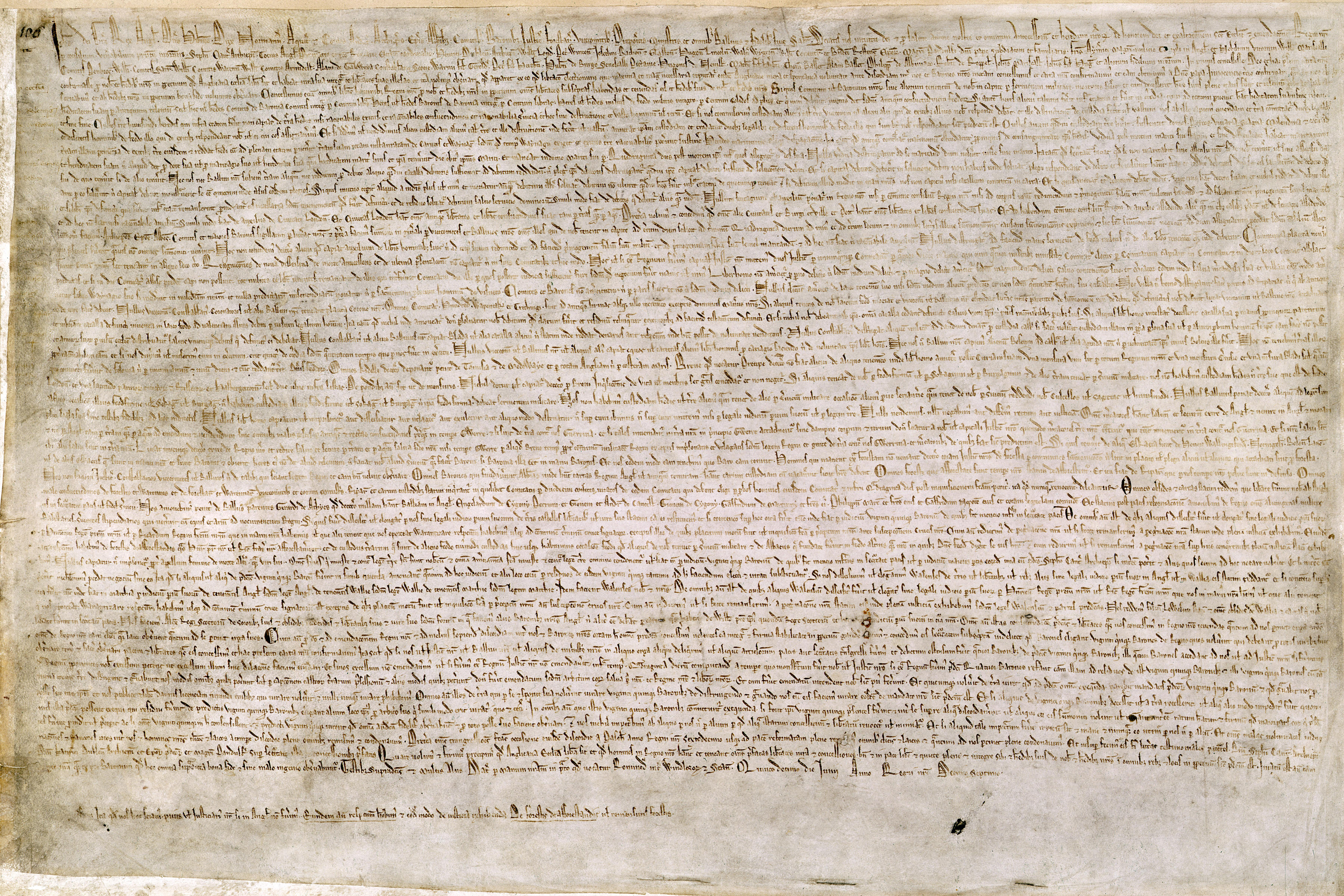
One of four surviving original copies of Magna Carta, agreed by John and the barons in 1215. British Library, London.

Within a few months of John's return, rebel barons in the north and east of England were organising resistance to his rule. John held a council in London in January 1215 to discuss potential reforms and sponsored discussions in Oxford between his agents and the rebels during the spring. He appears to have been playing for time until Pope Innocent III could send letters giving him explicit papal support. This was particularly important for John, as a way of pressuring the barons but also as a way of controlling Stephen Langton, the Archbishop of Canterbury. In the meantime, John began to recruit fresh mercenary forces from Poitou, although some were later sent back to avoid giving the impression that John was escalating the conflict. The King announced his intent to become a crusader, a move which gave him additional political protection under church law.

Letters of support from the Pope arrived in April, but by then the rebel barons had organised. They congregated at Northampton in May and renounced their feudal ties to John, appointing Robert fitz Walter as their military leader. This self-proclaimed "Army of God" marched on London, taking the capital as well as Lincoln and Exeter. John's efforts to appear moderate and conciliatory had been largely successful, but once the rebels held London they attracted a fresh wave of defectors from John's royalist faction. John instructed Langton to organise peace talks with the rebel barons.

John met the rebel leaders at Runnymede, near Windsor Castle, on 15 June 1215. Langton's efforts at mediation created a charter capturing the proposed peace agreement; it was later renamed Magna Carta, or "Great Charter". The charter went beyond simply addressing specific baronial complaints, and formed a wider proposal for political reform, albeit one focusing on the rights of free men, not serfs and unfree labour. It promised the protection of church rights, protection from illegal imprisonment, access to swift justice, new taxation only with baronial consent and limitations on scutage and other feudal payments. A council of twenty-five barons would be created to monitor and ensure John's future adherence to the charter, whilst the rebel army would stand down and London would be surrendered to the King.

Neither John nor the rebel barons seriously attempted to implement the peace accord. The rebel barons suspected that the proposed baronial council would be unacceptable to John and that he would challenge the legality of the charter; they packed the baronial council with their own hardliners and refused to demobilise their forces or surrender London as agreed. Despite his promises to the contrary, John appealed to Innocent for help, observing that the charter compromised the Pope's rights under the 1213 agreement that had appointed him John's feudal lord. Innocent obliged; he declared the charter "not only shameful and demeaning, but illegal and unjust" and excommunicated the rebel barons. The failure of the agreement led rapidly to the First Barons' War.

=== War with the barons ===
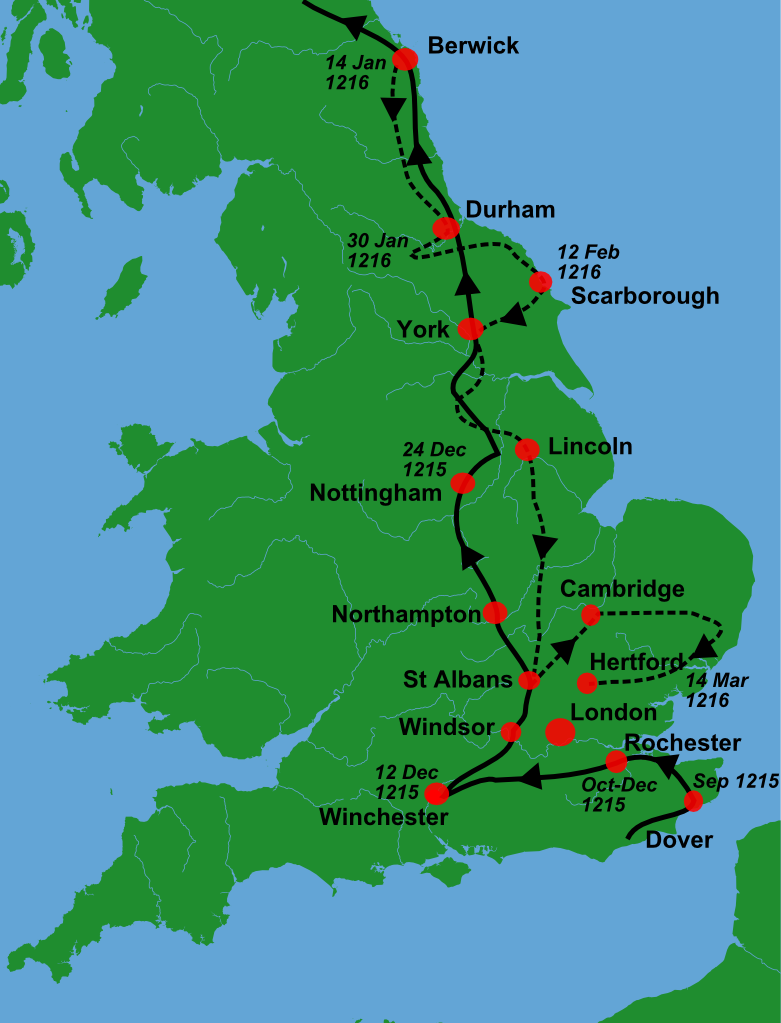
John's campaign from September 1215 to March 1216

The rebels made the first move in the war, seizing the strategic Rochester Castle, owned by Langton but left almost unguarded by the archbishop. John was well prepared for a conflict. He had stockpiled money to pay for mercenaries and ensured the support of the powerful marcher lords with their own feudal forces, such as William Marshal and Ranulf de Blondeville, 6th Earl of Chester. The rebels lacked the engineering expertise or heavy equipment necessary to assault the network of royal castles that cut off the northern rebel barons from those in the south. John's strategy was to isolate the rebel barons in London, protect his own supply lines to his key source of mercenaries in Flanders, prevent the French from landing in the south-east, and then win the war through slow attrition. John put off dealing with the badly deteriorating situation in North Wales, where Prince Llywelyn was leading a rebellion against the 1211 settlement.

John's campaign started well. In November John retook Rochester Castle from rebel baron William d'Aubigny in a sophisticated assault. One chronicler had not seen "a siege so hard pressed or so strongly resisted", whilst historian Reginald Brown describes it as "one of the greatest [siege] operations in England up to that time". Having regained the south-east John split his forces, sending William Longespée to retake the north side of London and East Anglia, whilst John himself headed north via Nottingham to attack the estates of the northern barons. Both operations were successful and the majority of the remaining rebels were pinned down in London. In January 1216 John marched against Alexander II of Scotland, who had allied himself with the rebel cause. John took back Alexander's possessions in northern England in a rapid campaign and pushed up towards Edinburgh over a ten-day period.

The rebel barons responded by inviting Prince Louis of France to lead them: Louis had a claim to the English throne by virtue of his marriage to Blanche of Castile, a granddaughter of Henry II. Philip may have provided his son with private support but refused to openly support Louis, who was excommunicated by Innocent for taking part in the war against John. Louis's planned arrival in England presented a significant problem for John, as Louis would bring with him naval vessels and siege engines essential to the rebel cause. Once John contained Alexander in Scotland, he marched south to deal with the challenge of the coming invasion.

Louis intended to land in the south of England in May 1216, and John assembled a naval force to intercept him. Unfortunately for John, his fleet was dispersed by bad storms and Louis landed unopposed in Kent. John hesitated and decided not to attack Louis immediately, either due to the risks of open battle or over concerns about the loyalty of his own men. Louis and the rebel barons advanced west and John retreated, spending the summer reorganising his defences across the rest of the kingdom. John saw several of his military household desert to the rebels, including his half-brother William Longespée. By the end of the summer the rebels had regained the south-east of England and parts of the north.

== Death ==
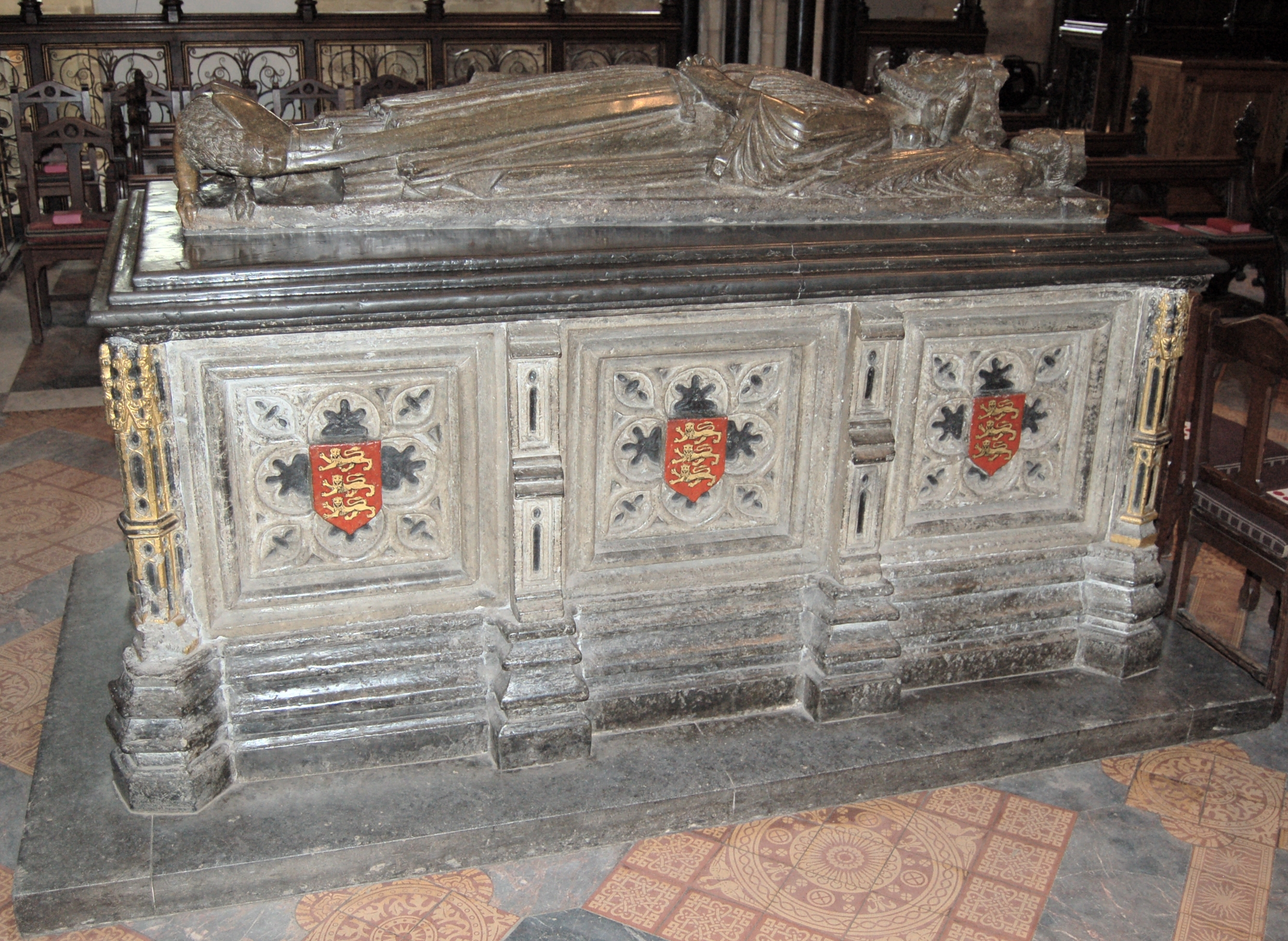
King John's tomb in Worcester Cathedral

In September 1216, John began a fresh, vigorous attack. He marched from the Cotswolds, feigned an offensive to relieve the besieged Windsor Castle, and attacked eastwards around London to Cambridge to separate the rebel-held areas of Lincolnshire and East Anglia. From there he travelled north to relieve the rebel siege at Lincoln and back east to Lynn, probably to order further supplies from the continent. In Lynn, John contracted dysentery, which would ultimately prove fatal. Meanwhile, Alexander II invaded northern England again, taking Carlisle in August and then marching south to give homage to Prince Louis for his English possessions; John narrowly missed intercepting Alexander along the way. Tensions between Louis and the English barons began to increase, prompting a wave of desertions, including William Marshal's son William and William Longespée, who both returned to John's faction.

John returned west but is said to have lost much of his baggage train along the way. Roger of Wendover provides the most graphic account of this, suggesting that the King's belongings, including the English Crown Jewels, were lost as he crossed one of the tidal estuaries which empties into the Wash, being sucked in by quicksand and whirlpools. Accounts of the incident vary considerably between the various chroniclers and the exact location of the incident has never been confirmed; the losses may have involved only a few of his pack-horses. Modern historians assert that by October 1216 John faced a "stalemate", "a military situation uncompromised by defeat".

John's illness grew worse and by the time he reached Newark Castle, Nottinghamshire, he was unable to travel any farther; he died on the night of 18/19 October. Numerous—probably fictitious—accounts circulated soon after his death that he had been killed by poisoned ale, poisoned plums or a "surfeit of peaches". His body was escorted south by a company of mercenaries and he was buried in Worcester Cathedral in front of the altar of St Wulfstan. A new sarcophagus with an effigy was made for him in 1232, in which his remains now rest. His heart was buried in Croxton Abbey.

== Legacy ==
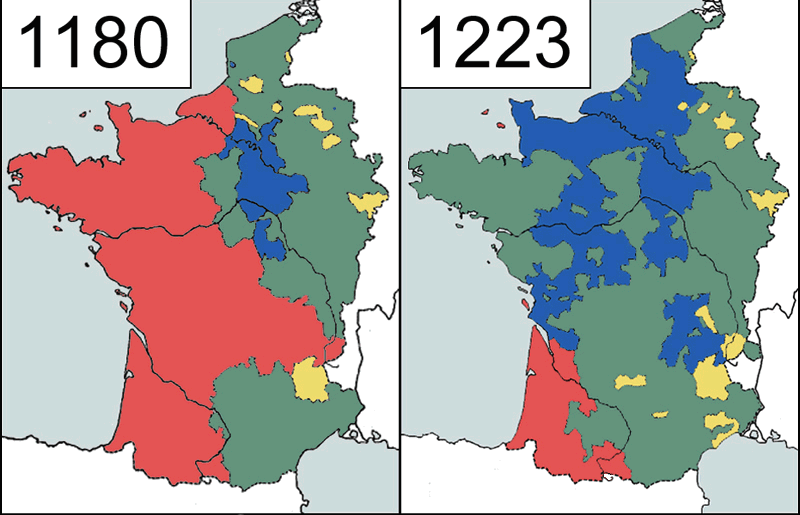
Changes in Angevin and Capetian holdings in France. Blue: French royal domains, Yellow: Church lordships, Red: Fiefs held by the king of England in vassalage from the French crown, Green: other fiefs held on behalf of the French crown

In the aftermath of John's death, William Marshal was declared the protector of the nine-year-old Henry III. The civil war continued until loyalist victories at the battles of Lincoln and Dover in 1217. Louis gave up his claim to the English throne and signed the Treaty of Lambeth. The failed Magna Carta agreement was resuscitated by Marshal's administration and reissued in an edited form in 1217 as a basis for future government. Henry III continued his attempts to reclaim Normandy and Anjou until 1259, but John's continental losses and the consequent growth of Capetian power in the 13th century proved to mark a "turning point in European history".

John's niece Eleanor of Brittany would remain treated with honours due a princess, but according to his will, she would never be released from prison, for she might have a potential claim to the throne of Henry III.

John's first wife, Isabella of Gloucester, was released from imprisonment in 1214; she remarried twice, and died in 1217. John's second wife, Isabella of Angoulême, left England for Angoulême soon after the King's death; she became a powerful regional leader, but largely abandoned her children by John. Their eldest son, Henry III, ruled as King of England for the majority of the 13th century. Their other son, Richard of Cornwall, became a noted European leader and ultimately the King of the Romans in the Holy Roman Empire. Their daughter Joan became Queen of Scotland on her marriage to Alexander II. Another daughter, Isabella, was Holy Roman Empress as the wife of Emperor Frederick II. The youngest daughter, Eleanor, married William Marshal's son, also called William, and later the famous English rebel Simon de Montfort.

By various mistresses, John had eight, possibly nine, sons—Richard, Oliver, John, Geoffrey, Henry, Osbert Gifford, Eudes, Bartholomew and probably Philip—and two or three daughters—Joan, Maud and probably Isabel. Of these, Joan became the most famous, marrying Prince Llywelyn the Great of Wales.

=== Historiography ===
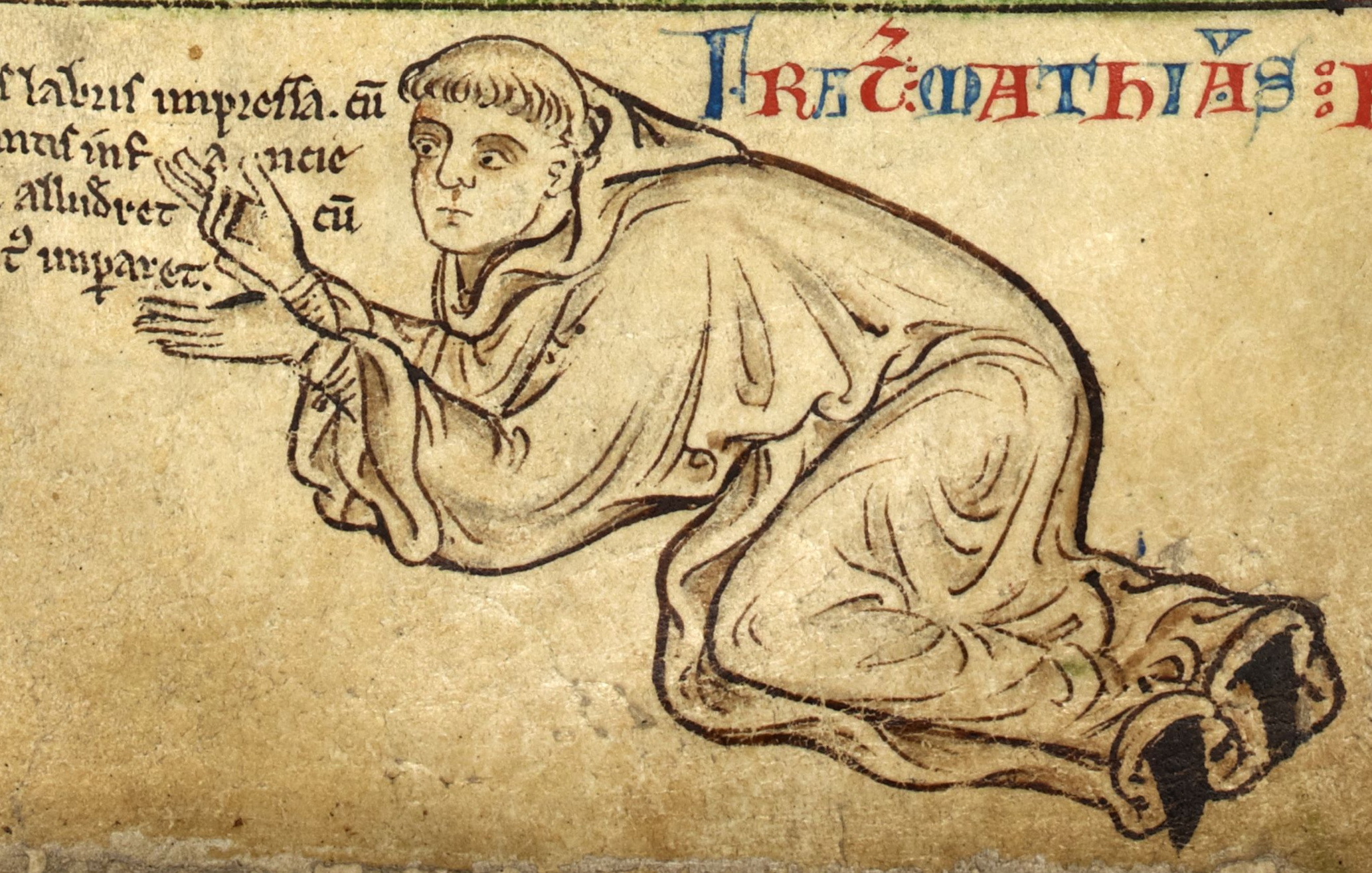
A self-portrait of Matthew Paris, one of the first historians of John's reign

Historical interpretations of John have been subject to considerable change over the centuries. Medieval chroniclers provided the first contemporary, or near contemporary, histories of John's reign. One group of chroniclers wrote early in John's life, or around the time of his accession, including Richard of Devizes, William of Newburgh, Roger of Hoveden and Ralph de Diceto. These historians were generally unsympathetic to John's behaviour under Richard's rule, but slightly more positive towards the very earliest years of John's reign.

Reliable accounts of the middle and later parts of John's reign are more limited, with Gervase of Canterbury and Ralph of Coggeshall writing the main accounts; neither of them were positive about John's performance as king. Much of John's later, negative reputation was established by two chroniclers writing after his death, Roger of Wendover and Matthew Paris, the latter claiming that John attempted conversion to Islam in exchange for military aid from the Almohad ruler Muhammad al-Nasir—a story modern historians consider untrue.

In the 16th century, political and religious changes altered the attitude of historians towards John. Tudor historians were generally favourably inclined towards the King, focusing on his opposition to the Papacy and his promotion of the special rights and prerogatives of a king. Revisionist histories written by John Foxe, William Tyndale and Robert Barnes portrayed John as an early Protestant hero, and Foxe included the King in his Book of Martyrs. John Speed's Historie of Great Britaine in 1632 praised John's "great renown" as a king; he blamed the bias of medieval chroniclers for the King's poor reputation.

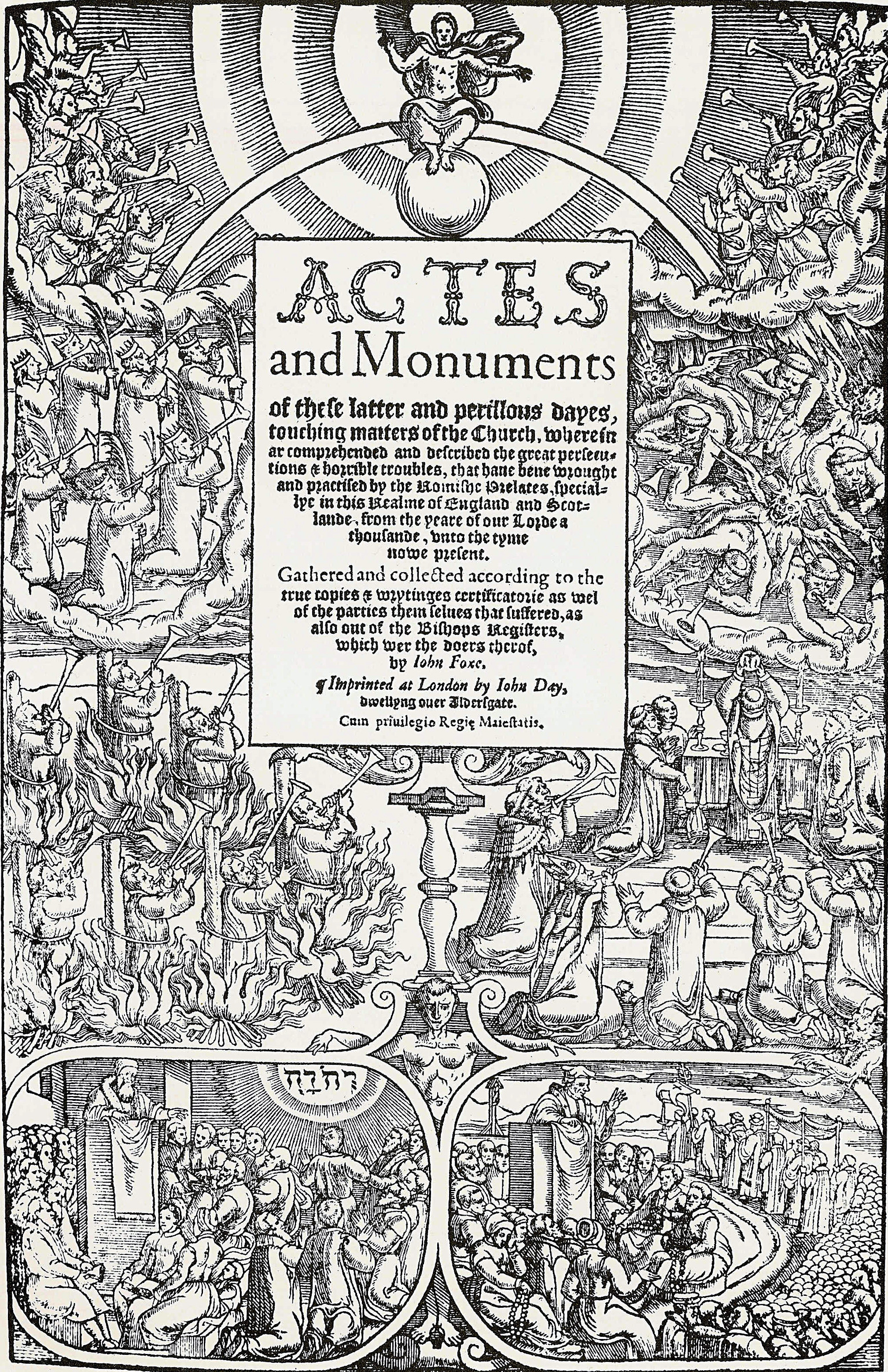
John Foxe's Book of Martyrs, officially titled Acts and Monuments, which took a positive view of John's reign

By the Victorian period in the 19th century, historians were more inclined to draw on the judgements of the chroniclers and to focus on John's moral personality. Kate Norgate, for example, argued that John's downfall had been due not to his failure in war or strategy, but due to his "almost superhuman wickedness", whilst James Ramsay blamed John's family background and his cruel personality for his downfall. Historians in the "Whiggish" tradition, focusing on documents such as the Domesday Book and Magna Carta, trace a progressive and universalist course of political and economic development in England over the medieval period.

These historians were often inclined to see John's reign, and his signing of Magna Carta in particular, as a positive step in the constitutional development of England, despite—or in reaction to—the flaws of the King himself. Winston Churchill, for example, argued that "[w]hen the long tally is added, it will be seen that the British nation and the English-speaking world owe far more to the vices of John than to the labours of virtuous sovereigns".

In the 1940s, new interpretations of John's reign began to be published, based on research into documents dating to his reign, such as pipe rolls, charters, court documents and similar primary records. Notably, an essay by Vivian Galbraith in 1945 proposed a "new approach" to understanding the ruler. The use of recorded evidence was combined with an increased scepticism about two of the most colourful chroniclers of John's reign, Roger of Wendover and Matthew Paris. In many cases, the detail provided by these chroniclers, both writing after John's death, was challenged by modern historians.

Interpretations of Magna Carta and the role of the rebel barons in 1215 have been significantly revised: Although the charter's symbolic, constitutional value for later generations is unquestionable, in the context of John's reign, most historians now consider it a failed peace agreement between "partisan" factions. There has been increasing debate about the nature of John's Irish policies. Specialists in Irish medieval history, such as Sean Duffy, have challenged the conventional narrative established by Lewis Warren, suggesting that Ireland was less stable by 1216 than was previously supposed.

Most historians today, including John's recent biographers Ralph Turner and Lewis Warren, argue that John was an unsuccessful monarch, but note that his failings were exaggerated by 12th- and 13th-century chroniclers. Jim Bradbury notes the current consensus that John was a "hard-working administrator, an able man, an able general", albeit, as Turner suggests, with "distasteful, even dangerous personality traits", including pettiness, spitefulness and cruelty. John Gillingham, author of a major biography of Richard I, follows this line too, although he considers John a less effective general than do Turner or Warren, and describes him "one of the worst kings ever to rule England".

Bradbury takes a moderate line, but suggests that in recent years modern historians have been overly lenient towards John's numerous faults. Popular historian Frank McLynn maintains a counter-revisionist perspective on John, arguing that the King's modern reputation amongst historians is "bizarre", and that, as a monarch, John "fails almost all those [tests] that can be legitimately set". According to C. Warren Hollister, "The dramatic ambivalence of his personality, the passions that he stirred among his own contemporaries, the very magnitude of his failures, have made him an object of endless fascination to historians and biographers."

=== Popular representations ===
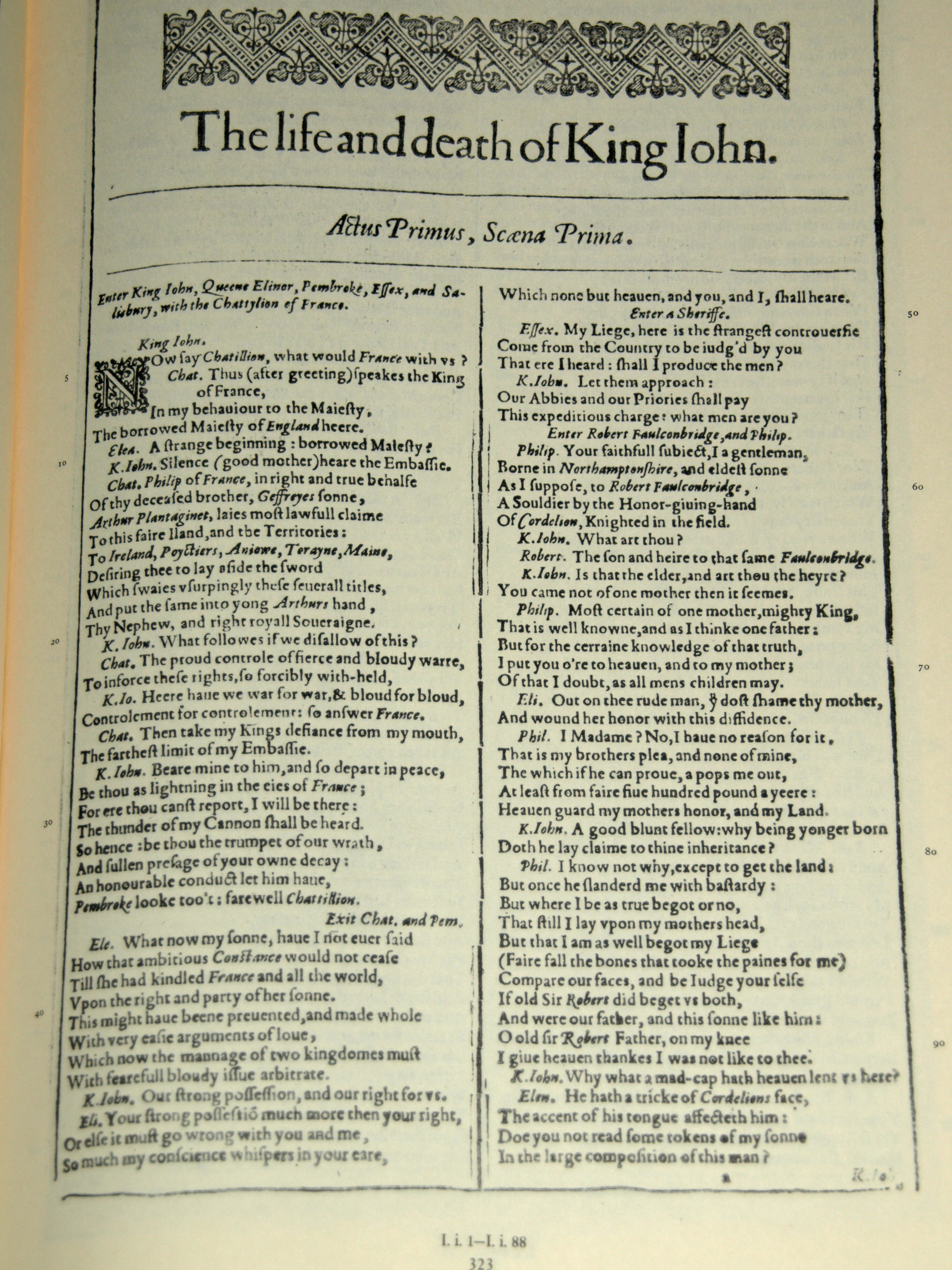
Shakespeare's play The Life and Death of King John

Popular representations of John first began to emerge during the Tudor period, mirroring the revisionist histories of the time. The anonymous play The Troublesome Reign of King John portrayed the King as a "proto-Protestant martyr", similar to that shown in John Bale's morality play Kynge Johan, in which John attempts to save England from the "evil agents of the Roman Church". By contrast, Shakespeare's King John, a relatively anti-Catholic play that draws on The Troublesome Reign for its source material, offers a more "balanced, dual view of a complex monarch as both a proto-Protestant victim of Rome's machinations and as a weak, selfishly motivated ruler".

Anthony Munday's play The Downfall and The Death of Robert Earl of Huntington portrays many of John's negative traits, but adopts a positive interpretation of the King's stand against the Roman Catholic Church, in line with the contemporary views of the Tudor monarchs. By the middle of the 17th century, plays such as Robert Davenport's King John and Matilda, although based largely on the earlier Elizabethan works, were transferring the role of Protestant champion to the barons and focusing more on the tyrannical aspects of John's behaviour.

Nineteenth-century fictional depictions of John were heavily influenced by Sir Walter Scott's historical romance, Ivanhoe, which presented "an almost totally unfavourable picture" of the King; the work drew on 19th-century histories of the period and on Shakespeare's play. Scott's work influenced the late-19th-century children's writer Howard Pyle's book The Merry Adventures of Robin Hood, which in turn established John as the principal villain within the traditional Robin Hood narrative.

During the 20th century, John was normally depicted in fictional books and films alongside Robin Hood. Sam De Grasse's role as John in the black-and-white 1922 film version shows John committing numerous atrocities and acts of torture. Claude Rains played John in the 1938 colour version alongside Errol Flynn, starting a trend for films to depict John as an "effeminate ... arrogant and cowardly stay-at-home". The character of John acts either to highlight the virtues of King Richard, or contrasts with the Sheriff of Nottingham, who is usually the "swashbuckling villain" opposing Robin.

An extreme version of this trend can be seen in the 1973 Disney cartoon version, for example, which depicts John, voiced by Peter Ustinov, as a "cowardly, thumbsucking lion". Popular works that depict John beyond the Robin Hood legends, such as James Goldman's play and later film, The Lion in Winter, set in 1183, commonly present him as an "effete weakling", in this instance contrasted with the more masculine Henry II, or as a tyrant, as in A. A. Milne's poem for children, "King John's Christmas".

== Issue ==
John and Isabella of Angoulême had five children:

1. Henry III, King of England (1 October 1207 – 16 November 1272)
2. Richard, King of the Romans (5 January 1209 – 2 April 1272)
3. Joan, Queen of Scotland (22 July 1210 – 4 March 1238)
4. Isabella, Holy Roman Empress (1214 – 1 December 1241)
5. Eleanor, Countess of Pembroke (1215 – 13 April 1275)

John had several mistresses, including one named Suzanne. His known illegitimate children are:

1. Richard FitzRoy (c. 1190 – June 1246), whose mother was Adela de Warenne, John's half-first cousin
2. Joan, Lady of Wales (c. 1191 – February 1237), also known by her Welsh name of Siwan
3. John (fl. 1201), who became a clerk
4. Geoffrey (died 1205), held the honour of Perche
5. Oliver fitz Regis (bef. 1199 – 1218/1219), whose mother was Hawise, sister of Fulk FitzWarin
6. Osbert Gifford

== Genealogical table ==
Norman English and early Plantagenet monarchs and their relationship with rulers of Western Europe
: Red borders indicate English monarchs
: Bold borders indicate legitimate children of English monarchs

Baldwin II; King of Jerusalem	Fulk IV; Count of Anjou	Bertrade	Philip I King of France	William the Conqueror; King of England r. 1066–1087	Margaret	Malcolm III; King of Scotland
Melisende; Queen of Jerusalem	Fulk V King of Jerusalem	Eremburga; Countess of Maine	Robert Curthose	William II; King of England r. 1087–1100	Adela	Henry I King of England r. 1100–1135	Edith/Matilda	Duncan II; King of Scotland	Edgar; King of Scotland	Alexander I King of Scotland	David I King of Scotland
Sibylla	William Clito	Stephen; King of England r. 1135–1154	Geoffrey Plantagenet; Count of Anjou	Empress Matilda	Henry V Holy Roman Emperor	William Adelin; Duke of Normandy	Matilda	Sybilla	Henry
Margaret	Philip of Alsace; Count of Flanders	Louis VII; King of France	Eleanor	Henry II; King of England r. 1154–1189	Geoffrey; Count of Nantes	William FitzEmpress; Viscount of Dieppe	Malcolm IV; King of Scotland	William the Lion; King of Scotland
Baldwin I Latin Emperor, Count of Flanders, and Count of Hainaut	Isabella	Philip II; King of France	Henry	Matilda	Richard I King of England r. 1189–1199	Geoffrey II; Duke of Brittany	Eleanor	Alfonso VIII; King of Castile	Joan	William II; King of Sicily	John; King of England r. 1199–1216
Louis VIII; King of France	Otto IV; Holy Roman Emperor	Arthur I Duke of Brittany	Blanche	Henry III; King of England r. 1216–1272	Richard of Cornwall; King of the Romans	Joan	Alexander II; King of Scotland

== See also ==
- List of earls in the reign of King John

== Bibliography ==
- Aberth, John (2003). A Knight at the Movies: Medieval History on Film. London: Routledge. ISBN 978-0-4159-3886-0.
- Barlow, Frank (1999). The Feudal Kingdom of England, 1042–1216. Harlow, UK: Pearson Education. ISBN 0-5823-8117-7.
- Barrett, Nick. "The Revenues of King John and Philip Augustus Revisited". In Church (2007).
- Bartlett, Robert (2000). England Under the Norman and Angevin Kings: 1075–1225. Oxford: Clarendon Press. ISBN 0-1982-2741-8.
- Bevington, David. "Literature and the theatre". In Loewenstein & Mueller (2002).
- Bolton, J. K. "English Economy in the Early Thirteenth Century". In Church (2007).
- Bradbury, Jim (1998). Philip Augustus, King of France 1180–1223. London: Longman. ISBN 978-0-5820-6058-6.
  ——. "Philip Augustus and King John: Personality and History". In Church (2007).
- Brown, Reginald Allen (1989). Rochester Castle: Kent. London: English Heritage. ISBN 978-1-8507-4129-9.
- Carpenter, David (1996). The Reign of Henry III. London: Hambledon Press. ISBN 978-1-8528-5137-8.
  —— (2004). The Struggle for Mastery: The Penguin History of Britain 1066–1284. London: Penguin. ISBN 978-0-1401-4824-4.
- Church, Stephen D. (1999). The Household Knights of King John. Cambridge University Press. ISBN 978-0-5215-5319-3.
  —— (2007). King John: New Interpretations. Woodbridge, UK: Boydell Press. ISBN 978-0-8511-5947-8.
  —— (2015). King John: England, Magna Carta and the Making of a Tyrant. London: Macmillan. ISBN 978-0-2307-7245-8.
  —— (2020). "The date and place of King John's birth together with a codicil on his name". Notes and Queries. 67 (3): 315–323. doi:10.1093/notesj/gjaa072.
- Churchill, Winston (1958). A History of the English-Speaking Peoples. Vol. 1. London: Cassell. OCLC 634802587.
- Coss, Peter. "From Feudalism to Bastard Feudalism". In Fryde, Monnet & Oexle (2002).
- Curren-Aquino, Deborah T., ed. (1989). King John: New Perspectives. Cranbury, US: University of Delaware Press. ISBN 978-0-8741-3337-0.
  ——. "Introduction: King John Resurgent". In Curren-Aquino (1989).
- D'Amassa, Don (2009). Encyclopedia of Adventure Fiction: The Essential Reference to the Great Works and Writers of Adventure Fiction. New York: Facts on File. ISBN 978-0-8160-7573-7.
- Danziger, Danny; Gillingham, John (2003). 1215: The Year of Magna Carta. London: Coronet Books. ISBN 978-0-7432-5778-7.
- Duffy, Sean. "John and Ireland: the Origins of England's Irish Problem". In Church (2007).
- Duncan, A. A. M. "John King of England and the King of the Scots". In Church (2007).
- Dyer, Christopher (2009). Making a Living in the Middle Ages: The People of Britain, 850–1520. London: Yale University Press. ISBN 978-0-3001-0191-1.
- Elliott, Andrew B. R. (2011). Remaking the Middle Ages: The Methods of Cinema and History in Portraying the Medieval World. Jefferson, US: McFarland. ISBN 978-0-7864-4624-7.
- Fryde, E. B.; Greenway, D. E.; Porter, S.; Roy, I., eds. (1996). Handbook of British Chronology (3rd ed.). Cambridge University Press. ISBN 0-5215-6350-X.
- Fryde, Natalie; Monnet, Pierre; Oexle, Oto, eds. (2002). Die Gegenwart des Feudalismus. Göttingen, Germany: Vandenhoeck and Ruprecht. ISBN 978-3-5253-5391-2.
- Fryde, Natalie. "King John and the Empire". In Church (2007).
- Galbraith, V. H. (1945). "Good and Bad Kings in English History". History. 30 (112): 119–132. doi:10.1111/j.1468-229X.1945.tb00882.x.
- Gillingham, John (1994). Richard Coeur de Lion: Kingship, Chivalry, and War in the Twelfth Century. London: Hambledon Press. ISBN 978-1-8528-5084-5.
  —— (2001). The Angevin Empire (2nd ed.). London: Hodder Arnold. ISBN 0-3407-4115-5.
  ——. "Historians without Hindsight: Coggshall, Diceto and Howden on the Early Years of John's Reign". In Church (2007).
- Given-Wilson, Chris (1996). An Illustrated History of Late Medieval England. Manchester University Press. ISBN 0-7190-4152-X.
- Hamilton, J.S. (2010). The Plantagenets: History of a Dynasty. London: Continuum. ISBN 978-1-4411-5712-6. OL 28013041M.
- Harper-Bill. "John and the Church of Rome". In Church (2007).
- Harris, Jesse W. (1940). John Bale, a study in the minor literature of the Reformation. Urbana, US: Illinois Studies in Language and Literature.
- Hodgett, Gerald (2006). A Social and Economic History of Medieval Europe. Abingdon, UK: Routledge. ISBN 978-0-4153-7707-2.
- Hollister, C. Warren (1961). "King John and the Historians". Journal of British Studies. 1 (1): 1–19. doi:10.1086/385431. JSTOR 175095. S2CID 143821381.
- Holt, James Clarke (1961). The Northerners: A Study in the Reign of King John. Oxford University Press. OCLC 862444.
  —— (1963). King John. London: Historical Association. OCLC 639752123.
  ——. "The Loss of Normandy and Royal Finance". In Holt & Gillingham (1984).
  ——; Gillingham, John, eds. (1984). War and Government in the Middle Ages: Essays in Honour of J. O. Prestwich. Woodbridge, UK: Boydell Press. ISBN 978-0-3892-0475-6.
- Hunnisett, R. F. (1961). The Medieval Coroner. Cambridge University Press. OCLC 408381.
- Huscroft, Richard (2005). Ruling England, 1042–1217. Harlow, UK: Pearson. ISBN 0-5828-4882-2.
- Inwood, Stephen (1998). A History of London. London: Macmillan. ISBN 978-0-7867-0613-6.
- Johnson, Hugh (1989). Vintage: The Story of Wine. New York: Simon and Schuster. ISBN 0-6716-8702-6.
- Jordan, William Chester (1991). "Isabelle d'Angoulême, by the Grace of God, Queen". Revue belge de philologie et d'histoire. 69 (4): 821–852. doi:10.3406/rbph.1991.3798.
- Lachaud, Frédérique (2018). Jean sans Terre (in French). Paris: Perrin. ISBN 978-2-2620-6481-5.
- Lawler, John; Lawler, Gail Gates (2000). A Short Historical Introduction to the Law of Real Property. Washington DC: Beard Books. ISBN 978-1-5879-8032-9.
- Lloyd, Alan (1972). The Maligned Monarch: a Life of King John of England. Garden City, US: Doubleday. OCLC 482542.
- Loewenstein, David; Mueller, Janel M., eds. (2002). The Cambridge History of Early Modern English Literature. Cambridge University Press. ISBN 978-0-5216-3156-3.
- Maley, Willy (2010). "'And bloody England into England gone': Empire, Monarchy, and Nation". In Maley, Willy; Tudeau-Clayton, Margaret (eds.). This England, That Shakespeare: New Angles on Englishness and the Bard. Farnham, UK: Ashgate Publishing. ISBN 978-0-7546-6602-8.
- Mason, Emma (2008). King Rufus: The Life and Murder of William II of England. Stroud, UK: The History Press. ISBN 978-0-7524-4635-6.
- McEachern, Claire. "Literature and national identity". In Loewenstein & Mueller (2002).
- McLynn, Frank (2007). Lionheart and Lackland: King Richard, King John and the Wars of Conquest. London: Vintage Books. ISBN 978-0-7126-9417-9.
- Morris, Marc (2015). King John: Treachery and Tyranny in Medieval England: The Road to Magna Carta. New York: Pegasus Books.
- Moss, V. D. "The Norman Exchequer Rolls of King John". In Church (2007).
- Norgate, Kate (1887). England Under the Angevin Kings. Vol. 2. London: Macmillan. OCLC 373944.
  —— (1902). John Lackland. London: Macmillan. OCLC 1374257.
- Painter, Sidney (2020) [1949]. The Reign of King John. Johns Hopkins University Press. ISBN 978-1-4214-3516-9.
- Poole, Stephen (1993). From Domesday Book to Magna Carta 1087–1216. Oxford University Press. ISBN 0-1928-5287-6.
- Potter, Lois (1998). Playing Robin Hood: the Legend as Performance in Five Centuries. Cranbury, US: University of Delaware Press. ISBN 978-0-8741-3663-0.
- Power, Daniel. "King John and the Norman Aristocracy". In Church (2007).
- Ramsay, James Henry (1903). The Angevin Empire. London: Sonnenschein. OCLC 2919309.
- Richardson, Douglas (2004). Plantagenet Ancestry: a Study in Colonial and Medieval Families. Salt Lake City: Genealogical Publishing. ISBN 978-0-8063-1750-2.
- Rowlands, Ifor W. "King John and Wales". In Church (2007).
- Scott, Walter (1998). Ivanhoe. Edinburgh University Press. ISBN 978-0-7486-0573-6.
- Seel, Graham E. (2012). King John: An Underrated King. London: Anthem Press. ISBN 978-0-8572-8518-8.
- Stenton, Doris Mary (1976). English Society in the Early Middle Ages (1066–1307). Harmondsworth, UK: Penguin. ISBN 0-1402-0252-8.
- Tulloch, Graham. "Historical Notes". In Scott (1998).
- Turner, Ralph V. (2009). King John: England's Evil King?. Stroud, UK: History Press. ISBN 978-0-7524-4850-3.
- Vincent, Nicholas. "Isabella of Angoulême: John's Jezebel". In Church (2007).
- Warren, W. Lewis (1991). King John. London: Methuen. ISBN 0-4134-5520-3.

John, King of England House of Plantagenet Born: 1166/7 Died: 19 October 1216
Regnal titles
Preceded by Richard I	Duke of Normandy; 1199–1204	Vacant Title next held by John II
Preceded by Richard I	Count of Maine; 1199–1204	Vacant Title next held by John Tristan
Preceded by Richard I	King of England; 1199–1216	Succeeded by Henry III
New title	Lord of Ireland; 1185–1216	Succeeded by Henry III
Preceded by Eleanor and Richard I	Duke of Aquitaine; 1199–1216 with Eleanor (1199–1204)	Succeeded by Henry III
Preceded by Eleanor and Richard I	Count of Poitou; 1199–1204 with Eleanor	Vacant Title next held by Alphonse
Preceded by Aymer	Count of Angoulême; 1202–1216 with Isabella	Succeeded by Isabella
