= Osbert Gifford =

Illegitimate son of King John of England

- Born: before 1215, likely before 1198; Oxfordshire, England
- Died: possibly 1245 (aged 45+)
- Father: King John of England
- Mother: Matilda Gifford or Hawise (Hadwisa) de Tracy

Osbert Gifford (also spelled Giffard; died c. 1245) was an illegitimate son of John, King of England. While historical records confirm him as a "son of the king", his exact parentage and the details of his life remain unknown.

Osbert's mother was either Hawise (Hadwisa) de Tracy or Matilda Gifford.

In 1215 the Sheriff of Oxfordshire was instructed to grant some of the lands of Thomas de Arden to Osbert Giffard, son of the king. The Latin for "son" – "filio" – is in quotes, which Cawley believes to imply that Gifford might have not been the son of the king. According to Cawley he is probably the Osbert Gifford who witnessed the charter dated 4 Jul 1216 under which John, King of England granted land to "Salom fil Lesholm de Dovr", which implies that by that point he was of age, which points to a likely birth date before 1198.

In 1217 he received further Arden lands in other counties, and lands of Amaury le Despencer, Roger Fitz Nicholas, and Ralph Bluet in Oxfordshire.

Beyond this, definite information of his life is lacking. Matthew Paris records the death of "Osberti Giffard, Walteri filii Gilberti de Bolum, fratris eius" in 1245, but he doesn't specify his parentage, which led Cawley to believe the record might be referring to Osbert Gifford of Winterborne Houghton. According to Cawley this text suggests that Gilbert de Bolum was the brother of Osbert Giffard.

== Works cited ==
- Cawley, Charles (2026). "ENGLAND, kings 1066-2022".
- Cawley, Charles (2026-03-22). "ENGLISH lords D - K". Medieval Lands. Archived from the original on 2024-08-16.
- New England Historic Genealogical Society (2026-03-22). "New England Historical and Genealogical Register". New England Historical and Genealogical Register. Archived from the original on 2026-03-21.
- Richardson, Douglas (2013). Everingham, Kimball G. (ed.). Royal Ancestry: A Study in Colonial and Medieval Families (5nd ed.). p. 54. ISBN 9781731049940.
- Sheppard, Walter Lee (1965). Royal Bye-blows. The Illegitimate Children of the English Kings from William I to Edward III. p. 98.
- Paris, Matthew (1245). Luard, Henry Richards (ed.). Chronica Majora [Matthew Paris's English history: From the year 1235 to 1273] (in Latin). Vol. IV. Translated by Giles, J.A. Creative Media Partners, LLC. p. 491. ISBN 9781377784601.
- Turner, Ralph (2026-03-22). "Bastards of King John, Chart". Academia. Archived from the original on 2025-01-26.
