= List of earls in the reign of King John =

The following individuals were Earls (suo jure or jure uxoris) or Countesses (suo jure) during the reign of John, King of England who reigned from 1199 to 1216.

The period of tenure as Earl or Countess is given after the name and title of each individual, including any period of minority.

Earl of Arundel

William d'Aubigny, 3rd Earl of Arundel (1193-1221)

Earl of Chester

Ranulf de Blondeville, 6th Earl of Chester (1181-1232)

Earl of Derby

William de Ferrers, 4th Earl of Derby (1190-1247)

Earl of Devon

William de Redvers, 5th Earl of Devon (1193-1217)

Earl of Essex

Geoffrey Fitz Peter, 1st Earl of Essex (1199-1213)

Geoffrey FitzGeoffrey de Mandeville, 2nd Earl of Essex (1213-1216)

William FitzGeoffrey de Mandeville, 3rd Earl of Essex (1216-1227)

Earl of Gloucester

Amaury VI of Montfort-Évreux, Earl of Gloucester (1200-1213)

Isabella, Countess of Gloucester suo jure (1213-1217)

Geoffrey FitzGeoffrey de Mandeville, 2nd Earl of Essex, Earl of Gloucester jure uxoris (1214-1216)

Earl of Hereford

Henry de Bohun, 1st Earl of Hereford (1199-1220)

Earl of Hertford

Richard de Clare, 3rd Earl of Hertford (1173-1217)

Earl of Huntingdon

David of Scotland, Earl of Huntingdon (1185-1219)

Earl of Leicester

Robert de Beaumont, 4th Earl of Leicester (1191-1204)

Simon de Montfort, 5th Earl of Leicester (1207-1218)

Earl of Norfolk

Roger Bigod, 2nd Earl of Norfolk (1190-1221)

Earl of Oxford

Aubrey de Vere, 2nd Earl of Oxford (1194-1214)

Robert de Vere, 3rd Earl of Oxford (1214-1221)

Earl of Pembroke

Isabel de Clare, 4th Countess of Pembroke suo jure (1185-1199)

Earl of Pembroke (Second Creation)

William Marshall, 1st Earl of Pembroke (1199-1219)

Earl of Richmond

Constance, Duchess of Brittany, Countess of Richmond suo jure (1171-1201)

Geoffrey II, Duke of Brittany, Earl of Richmond jure uxoris (1181-1186)

Ranulf de Blondeville, 6th Earl of Chester, Earl of Richmond jure uxoris (1199-1201)

Guy of Thouars, Earl of Richmond jure uxoris (1199-1201)

Arthur I, Duke of Brittany, Earl of Richmond (1201-1203)

Eleanor, Fair Maid of Brittany, Countess of Richmond suo jure (1203-1218)

Alix, Duchess of Brittany, Countess of Richmond suo jure (1203-1221)

Earl of Salisbury

Ela of Salisbury, 3rd Countess of Salisbury suo jure (1196-1261)

William Longespée, 3rd Earl of Salisbury jure uxoris (1196-1226)

Earl of Surrey

Isabel de Warenne, Countess of Surrey suo jure (1148-1203)

William I, Count of Boulogne, Earl of Surrey jure uxoris (1153-1159)

Hamelin de Warenne, Earl of Surrey jure uxoris (1159-1202)

William de Warenne, 5th Earl of Surrey (1202-1240)

Earl of Warwick

Waleran de Beaumont, 4th Earl of Warwick (1184-1203)

Henry de Beaumont, 5th Earl of Warwick (1203-1229)

Earl of Winchester

Saer de Quincy, 1st Earl of Winchester (1207-1219)

== Sources ==
Ellis, Geoffrey. (1963) Earldoms in Fee: A Study in Peerage Law and History. London: The Saint Catherine Press, Limited.
