= Thomas Howard, 2nd Duke of Norfolk =

English nobleman and statesman (1443–1524)

His Grace The Duke of Norfolk KG, PC
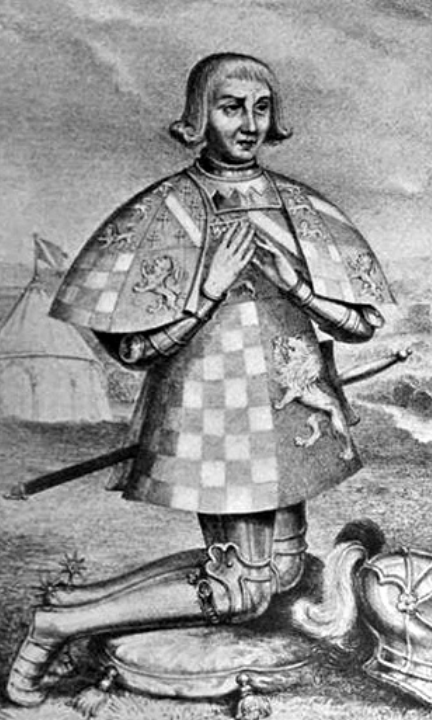
- 1907 copy of a contemporary depiction

Lord High Treasurer
- In office 16 June 1501 – 4 December 1522
- Monarchs: Henry VII; Henry VIII
- Preceded by: John Dynham, 1st Baron Dynham
- Succeeded by: Thomas Howard, 3rd Duke of Norfolk

Earl Marshal
- In office 1509–1524
- Preceded by: The Duke of York
- Succeeded by: The Duke of Suffolk

Member of the House of Lords Lord Temporal
- In office 1514 – 21 May 1524; Hereditary Peerage
- Preceded by: The 1st Duke of Norfolk
- Succeeded by: The 3rd Duke of Norfolk

Personal details
- Born: 1443 Stoke-by-Nayland, Suffolk, England
- Died: 21 May 1524 (aged 80–81) Framlingham Castle, Suffolk, England
- Spouses: Elizabeth Tilney (m. 1472; died 1497) Agnes Tilney (m. 1497)
- Children: Thomas Howard, 3rd Duke of Norfolk; Sir Edward Howard; Lord Edmund Howard; Elizabeth Boleyn, Countess of Wiltshire; William Howard, 1st Baron Howard of Effingham; Lord Thomas Howard; 12 more
- Parents: John Howard, 1st Duke of Norfolk (father); Catherine Moleyns (mother)

Thomas Howard, 2nd Duke of Norfolk KG PC (1443 – 21 May 1524), known as The Earl of Surrey from 1483 to 1485 and again from 1489 to 1514, was an English nobleman, soldier and statesman who served four monarchs. He was the eldest son of John Howard, 1st Duke of Norfolk, by his first wife, Catherine Moleyns. The Duke was the grandfather of both Anne Boleyn and Catherine Howard and the great-grandfather of Queen Elizabeth I. In 1513, he led the English to victory over the Scots at the decisive Battle of Flodden, for which he was richly rewarded by Henry VIII, then away in France.

== Early life ==
Thomas Howard was born in 1443 at Stoke-by-Nayland, Suffolk, the only surviving son of John Howard, later 1st Duke of Norfolk, by his first wife, Katherine, the daughter of Sir William Moleyns and his wife Margery. He was educated at Thetford Grammar School.

== Service under Edward IV ==
While a young man, he entered the service of King Edward IV as a henchman. Howard took the King's side when war broke out in 1469 with the Earl of Warwick, and took sanctuary at Colchester when the King fled to Holland in 1470. Howard rejoined the royal forces at Edward's return to England in 1471, and was severely wounded at the Battle of Barnet on 14 April 1471. He was appointed an esquire of the body in 1473. On 14 January 1478 he was knighted by Edward IV at the marriage of the King's second son, the young Duke of York, and Lady Anne Mowbray (died 1481).

== Service under Richard III ==
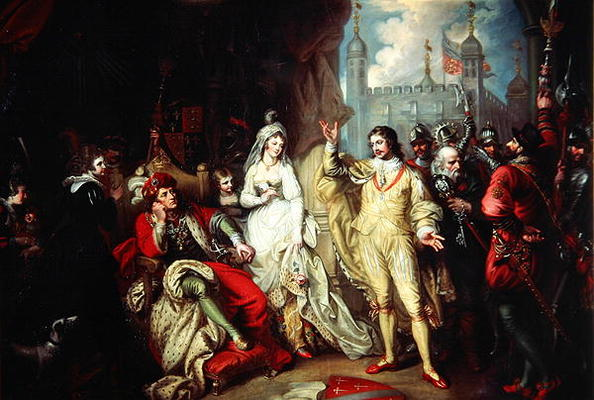
A painting by Mather Brown depicting Norfolk defending his allegiance to Richard III before Henry VII, after the Battle of Bosworth Field. The Tower of London is in the background.

After the death of Edward IV on 9 April 1483, Thomas Howard and his father John supported Richard III. Thomas bore the Sword of State at Richard's coronation and served as steward at the coronation banquet. Both Thomas and his father were granted lands by the new King, and Thomas was also granted an annuity of £1000. On 28 June 1483, John Howard was created Duke of Norfolk, while Thomas was created Earl of Surrey. Surrey was also sworn of the Privy Council and invested with the Order of the Garter. In the autumn of that year Norfolk and Surrey suppressed a rebellion against the King by the Duke of Buckingham. Both Howards remained close to King Richard throughout his two-year reign, and fought for him at the Battle of Bosworth in 1485, where Surrey was wounded and taken prisoner, and his father killed. Surrey was attainted in the first Parliament of the new King, Henry VII, stripped of his lands, and committed to the Tower of London, where he spent the next three years.

== Service under Henry VII ==
Howard was offered an opportunity to escape during the rebellion of the Earl of Lincoln in 1487, but refused, perhaps thereby convincing Henry VII of his loyalty. In May 1489 Henry restored him to the earldom of Surrey, although most of his lands were withheld, and sent him to quell a rebellion in Yorkshire. Surrey remained in the north as the King's lieutenant until 1499. He and his family lived in Sheriff Hutton Castle while in the North. In 1496/7 he was given a command against invading Scots and took his sons Thomas and Edward with him. Surrey knighted both of them on 30 September 1497 at Ayton Castle, on the same day the treaty of Ayton was signed at the nearby church.

In 1499, Surrey was recalled to court, and accompanied the King on a state visit to France in the following year. In 1501 he was again appointed a member of the Privy Council, and on 16 June of that year was made Lord High Treasurer. Surrey, Richard Foxe (Bishop of Winchester and Lord Privy Seal) and William Warham (Archbishop of Canterbury and Lord Chancellor), became the King's "executive triumvirate". He was entrusted with a number of diplomatic missions. In 1501, he was involved in the negotiations for Katherine of Aragon's marriage to Arthur, Prince of Wales, and in 1503 conducted Margaret Tudor to Scotland for her marriage to King James IV. Margaret found Howard rude and overbearing on the journey and resented his monopolisation of her new husband after the wedding.

== Service under Henry VIII ==
Howard augmentation of honour, awarded to Thomas Howard, 2nd Duke of Norfolk after the Battle of Flodden (1513): Or, a demi-lion rampant pierced through the mouth by an arrow within a double tressure flory-counterflory-gules, to be borne on the bend in the Howard arms

Norfolk's Coat of arms with "Flodden augmentation"

Surrey was an executor of the will of King Henry VII when the King died on 21 April 1509, and played a prominent role in the coronation of King Henry VIII, in which he served as Earl Marshal. He challenged Thomas Wolsey in an effort to become the new King's first minister, but eventually accepted Wolsey's supremacy. Surrey expected to lead the 1513 expedition to France, but was left behind when the King departed for Calais on 30 June 1513. Shortly thereafter King James IV of Scotland launched an invasion into England, and Surrey, with the aid of other noblemen and his sons Thomas and Edmund, crushed James's much larger force at the Battle of Flodden, near Branxton, Northumberland, on 9 September 1513. The Scots may have lost as many as 10,000 men, and King James was killed. The victory at Flodden brought Surrey great popular renown and royal rewards. On 1 February 1514, at the age of 71, he was created 2nd Duke of Norfolk, his late father's title, and his son Thomas was made Earl of Surrey. Both were granted lands and annuities, and the Howard arms were augmented in honour of Flodden with an inescutcheon bearing the lion of Scotland pierced through the mouth with an arrow.

== Final years ==
In the final decade of his life, Norfolk continued his career as a courtier, diplomat and soldier. In 1514 he joined Wolsey and Foxe in negotiating the marriage of Mary Tudor to King Louis XII of France, and escorted her to France for the wedding. On 1 May 1517, he led a private army of 1,300 retainers into London to suppress the Evil May Day riots. In May 1521 he presided as Lord High Steward over the trial of Edward Stafford, 3rd Duke of Buckingham, father of Norfolk's daughter-in-law, Elizabeth. According to David M. Head, "he pronounced the sentence of death with tears streaming down his face".

By the spring of 1522, Norfolk was almost 80 years of age and in failing health. He withdrew from court, resigned as Lord Treasurer in favour of his son in December of that year, and after attending the opening of Parliament in April 1523, retired to his ducal castle at Framlingham in Suffolk where he died on 21 May 1524. His funeral and burial on 22 June at Thetford Priory were said to have been "spectacular and enormously expensive, costing over £1300 and including a procession of 400 hooded men bearing torches and an elaborate bier surmounted with 100 wax effigies and 700 candles", befitting the richest and most powerful peer in England. After the dissolution of Thetford Priory, the Howard tombs were moved to the Church of St Michael the Archangel, Framlingham. A now-lost monumental brass depicting the 2nd Duke was formerly in the Church of St. Mary at Lambeth.

== Marriages and issue ==
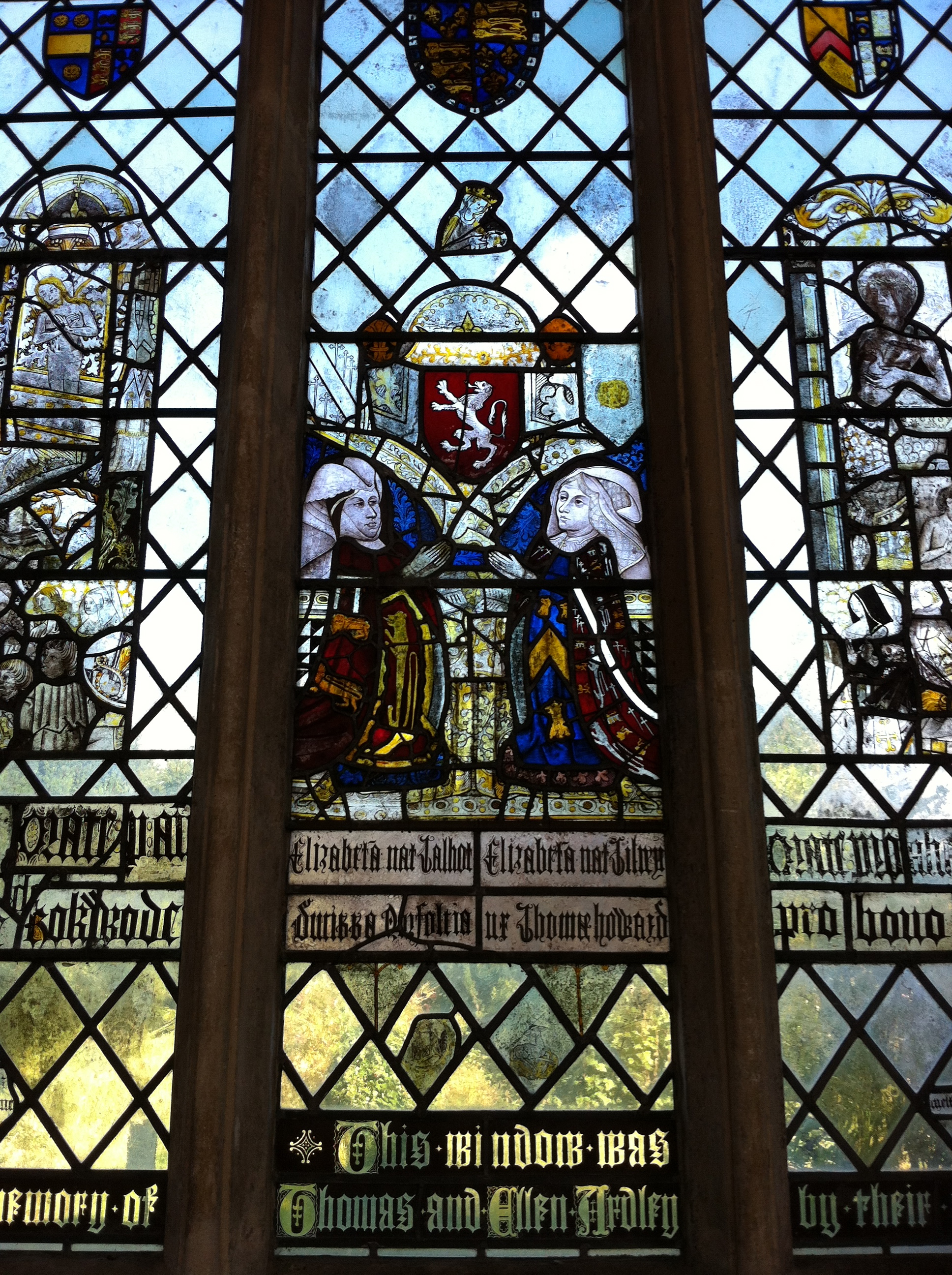
Right: Elizabeth Tilney, first wife of Thomas Howard, 2nd Duke of Norfolk. On her kirtle, she displays her paternal arms Azure a chevron between three griffin's heads erased or (Tilney) and on her mantle the quartered arms of Howard (1&4: Gules a bend between six cross crosslets fitchy argent (Howard); 2&3: grand quarterly first and fourth Brotherton second and third Mowbray). Below is inscribed in Latin: Elizabeta nat(a) Tilney ux(or) Thomae Howard ("Elizabeth born Tilney wife of Thomas Howard"). Left: Elizabeth Talbot de Mowbray, Duchess of Norfolk. Stained glass in Holy Trinity Church, Long Melford, Suffolk

On 30 April 1472, Howard married Elizabeth Tilney, the daughter of Sir Frederick Tilney of Ashwellthorpe, Norfolk, and widow of Sir Humphrey Bourchier, slain at Barnet, son and heir apparent of John Bourchier, 1st Baron Berners. They had issue:

- Thomas Howard, 3rd Duke of Norfolk
- Sir Edward Howard
- Lord Edmund Howard, father of Henry VIII's fifth wife, Catherine Howard
- Sir John Howard (1482–1530)
- Henry Howard
- Charles Howard
- Henry Howard (the younger)
- Richard Howard
- Elizabeth Howard, married Thomas Boleyn, 1st Earl of Wiltshire, and was the mother of Anne Boleyn and grandmother of Queen Elizabeth I
- Muriel Howard (died 1512), married firstly John Grey, 2nd Viscount Lisle (died 1504), and secondly Sir Thomas Knyvet

Norfolk's first wife died on 4 April 1497, and on 8 November 1497 he married, by dispensation dated 17 August 1497, her cousin, Agnes Tilney, the daughter of Hugh Tilney of Skirbeck and Boston, Lincolnshire and Eleanor, a daughter of Walter Tailboys. They had issue:

- William Howard, 1st Baron Howard of Effingham
- Lord Thomas Howard (1511–1537)
- Richard Howard (d. 1517)
- Dorothy Howard, married Edward Stanley, 3rd Earl of Derby
- Anne Howard, married John de Vere, 14th Earl of Oxford
- Katherine Howard, married firstly, Rhys ap Gruffydd, and secondly, Henry Daubeney, 1st Earl of Bridgewater
- Elizabeth Howard (d. 1536), married Henry Radclyffe, 2nd Earl of Sussex

Note: Thomas Howard indeed had two living daughters named Elizabeth Howard and two living sons named Thomas Howard. It is unclear if he had two sons named Richard as well or if it was the same person. In the Dukes of Norfolk family tree, there is clearly a mistake. Richard Howard is there linked to Agnes Tilney (2nd wife of Thomas Howard), yet is said to born in 1487, which is impossible to be true, as at the time Thomas Howard was married to Elizabeth Tilney.

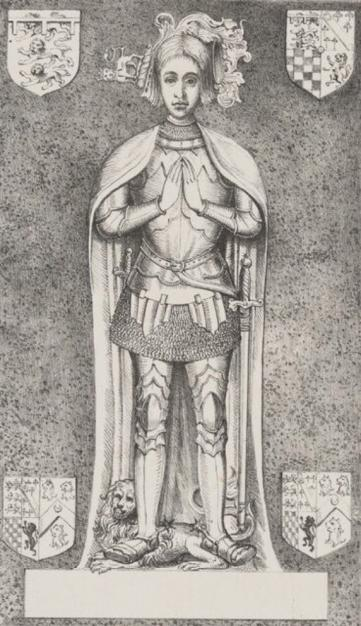
Sketch of the grave of Thomas Howard, 2nd Duke of Norfolk. He was originally buried at Thetford St. Mary's Priory Church, but was removed by his son after the dissolution of that house in 1537, and may have been moved to Lambeth, but no trace of his tomb was to be found when John Aubrey visited there in the 1690s. The church itself was substantially rebuilt.

== Family ==
=== Ancestors ===
Ancestors of Thomas Howard, 2nd Duke of Norfolk

John Howard (died 1437)
Robert Howard (knight)
Alice Tendring
John Howard, 1st Duke of Norfolk
Thomas de Mowbray, 1st Duke of Norfolk
Lady Margaret Mowbray
Lady Elizabeth FitzAlan
Thomas Howard, 2nd Duke of Norfolk
Sir Richard de Moleyns
William Moleyns
Eleanor de Beaumont
Katherine de Moleyns
Sir John Whalesborough
Margery Whalesborough
Joan Raleigh

=== Family tree ===
Family tree of the Dukes of Norfolk and Suke of Surrey; Earls of Arundel, East Anglia, Norfolk, Norwich, Nottingham, and Surrey; and Barons Mowbray, Segrave and Stourton

Earl of East Anglia (Earls of Norfolk and Suffolk) (1st creation), a. 1069
Ralph the Staller c. 1011–1068; 1st Earl of Norfolk and Suffolk, or of the East Angles (Earl c. 1066/67 – 1068)
Earl of Surrey (1st creation), c. 1088
Ralph de Gael a. 1040–1100; 2nd Earl of Norfolk and Suffolk, or of the East Angles (Earl 1068–1074)	Roger Bigod (Bigot) d. 1107; Sheriff of Norfolk and Suffolk	William de Warenne c. 1035–1088; 1st Earl (of) Warenne / Earl of Surrey, Lord of Lewes, Seigneur de Varennes
Earldom forfeit, 1074
Earl of Norfolk (2nd creation), 1141
King Henry I c. 1068–1135	Maud Bigod	William Bigod d. 1120	Hugh Bigod; 1095–1177; 1st Earl of Norfolk (Earl 1141–1177)	William de Warenne d. 1138; 2nd Earl (of) Warenne / Earl of Surrey
Earl of Arundel, Earl of Sussex (1st creations), c. 1138
Empress Matilda c. 1102–1167	Geoffrey Plantagenet; 1113–1251; Count of Anjou	Adeliza of Louvain c. 1103–1151	William d'Aubigny c. 1109–1176; 1st Earl of Arundel (Sussex), Earl of Lincoln	William de Warenne; 1119–1148; 3rd Earl of Surrey
King Henry II; 1133–1189	William d'Aubigny b. c. 1138/1150–1176; 2nd Earl of Arundel (Sussex)	Roger Bigod c. 1144/1150–1221; 2nd Earl of Norfolk (Earl 1189–1221, disputed 1177–1189)	William of Blois c. 1137–1159	Isabel de Warenne c. 1130 – 1203; 4th Countess of Surrey suo jure	Hamelin de Warenne c. 1130–1202; Comte de Warenne / Earl of Surrey, jure uxoris
King John; 1166/1167–1216	William d'Aubigny a. 1180–1221; 3rd Earl of Arundel (Sussex)	Hugh Bigod; 1186–1225; 3rd Earl of Norfolk (Earl 1221–1225)	Maud Marshal; 1192–1248	William de Warenne c. 1160s/1170s–1240 5th Earl of Surrey
William d'Aubigny c. 1203–a. 1124; 4th Earl of Arundel (Sussex)	Hugh d'Aubigny d. 1243; 5th Earl of Arundel (Sussex)	Isabel d'Aubigny	John Fitzalan; 1200–1240; Lord of Clun and Oswestry	Roger Bigod c. 1209–1270; 4th Earl of Norfolk (Earl 1233–1270)	Hugh Bigod c. 1211–1266
Earl of Sussex (1st creation), 1282
King Henry III; 1207–1272	John Fitzalan; 1223–1267; 6th Earl of Arundel (Sussex), jure matris	John de Warenne; 1231–1304; 1st Earl of Sussex (Earl of Sussex 1282–1304), 6th Earl of Surrey (Earl of Surrey 1240–1304)
Baron Segrave of Se(a)grave, 1283
Nicholas Segrave c. 1238–a. 1295; 1st Baron Segrave	King Edward I 1239–1307	Edmund Crouchback; 1245–1296; Earl of Lancaster	John Fitzalan; 1246–1272; 7th Earl of Arundel (Sussex), jure matris	Roger Bigod c. 1245–1306; 5th Earl of Norfolk (Earl 1270–1306)
Earldom extinct, 1270
Baron Mowbray, 1283	Earl of Arundel (2nd (1st by writ) creation), 1289
John Segrave c. 1256–1325; 2nd Baron Segrave	Roger de Mowbray; 1254–1297; 1st Baron Mowbray	Richard Fitzalan; 1267–1302; 1st (or 6th) Earl of Arundel	William de Warenne; 1256–1286
Earl of Norfolk (3rd creation), 1312
Stephen Segrave d. 1325; 3rd Baron Segrave	Thomas of Brotherton; 1300–1338; 1st Earl of Norfolk (Earl 1312–1338)	John Mowbray; 1286–1322; 2nd Baron Mowbray	Henry c. 1281–1345; Earl of Leicester, Earl of Lancaster	Edmund Fitzalan; 1286–1326; 2nd (or 7th) Earl of Arundel	Alice de Warenne; 1287–1388 heir apparent to the Earldom of Surrey	John de Warenne; 1286–1347; 7th Earl of Surrey, 2nd Earl of Sussex
Earldom of Arundel (2nd creation) forfeit, 1326	Earldom of Sussex extinct(?), 1347
Earldom of Arundel (2nd creation) restored, 1331
John Segrave; 1315–1353; 4th Baron Segrave	Margaret of Brotherton; 1320–1399; Duchess of Norfolk "for life" (Duchess 1397–1399), 2nd Countess of Norfolk (Countess 1338–1399),	John Mowbray; 1310–1361; 3rd Baron Mowbray	Joan of Lancaster c. 1312–1349	Eleanor of Lancaster; 1318–1372	Richard FitzAlan c. 1313–1376; 3rd (or 8th) Earl of Arundel (Earl of Arundel 1331–1376), 8th Earl of Surrey (Earl of Surrey 1347–1376)
Baron Arundel, 1377
Elizabeth de Segrave; 1338–1368; 5th Baroness Segrave	John de Mowbray; 1340–1368; 4th Baron Mowbray	Richard FitzAlan; 1346–1397; 4th (or 9th) Earl of Arundel, 9th Earl of Surrey	John FitzAlan c. 1348–1379; 1st Baron Arundel	Alice FitzAlan
Earldom of Arundel (2nd creation) forfeit, 1397
Earl of Nottingham (1st creation), 1377	Earl of Nottingham (2nd creation), 1383; Duke of Norfolk (1st creation), 1397	Duke of Surrey, 1397
John de Mowbray; 1365–1383; Earl of Nottingham (Earl 1377–1383), 6th Baron Segrave, 5th Baron Mowbray (Baron 1368–1383)	Thomas de Mowbray; 1366–1399; 1st Duke of Norfolk, etc. (Duke 1397–1399), 3rd Earl of Norfolk (Earl 1399), 7th Baron Segrave, 6th Baron Mowbray (Baron 1377–1399)	Elizabeth Fitzalan; 1366–1425	John FitzAlan; 1364–1390; 2nd Baron Arundel	Thomas Holland; 1372–1400; Duke of Surrey, Earl of Kent, Baron Holland
Earldom of Nottingham extinct, 1383	Titles forfeit, 1399	Dukedom of Surrey renounced, 1400
Baron Stourton, 1448	Duke of Norfolk (1st creation restored), 1425	Earldom of Arundel (2nd creation) restored, 1400
John Stourton; 1400–1462; 1st Baron Stourton (Baron 1448–1462)	Thomas de Mowbray; 1385–1405; 4th Earl of Norfolk, 8th Baron Segrave, 7th Baron Mowbray (Earl 1399–1405)	John de Mowbray; 1392–1432; 2nd Duke of Norfolk (Duke 1425–1432), 5th Earl of Norfolk, 9th Baron Segrave, 8th Baron Mowbray (Earl 1405–1432)	Margaret de Mowbray c. 1388–1459	Robert Howard; 1385–1436	Isabel de Mowbray c. 1400–1452	Thomas FitzAlan; 1381–1415; 5th (or 10th) Earl of Arundel, 10th Earl of Surrey	John Fitzalan; 1385–1421; 6th (or 11th) Earl of Arundel, 3rd Baron Arundel, 3rd Baron Maltravers
Duke of Norfolk (4th creation), 1483
William Stourton a. 1426–1478; 2nd Baron Stourton (Baron 1462–1478)	John de Mowbray; 1415–1461; 3rd Duke of Norfolk, 6th Earl of Norfolk, 10th Baron Segrave, 9th Baron Mowbray (Duke 1432–1461)	John Howard; 1425–1485; 1st Duke of Norfolk, 13th Baron Segrave, 12th Baron Mowbray (Duke 1483–1485)	John Fitzalan; 1408–1435; 7th (or 12th) Earl of Arundel, 4th Baron Arundel, 4th Baron Maltravers	William Fitzalan; 1417–1487; 9th (or 14th) Earl of Arundel, 6th Baron Arundel, 6th Baron Maltravers
Titles forfeit, 1485
Earl of Surrey (2nd creation), 1451	Duke of Norfolk (4th creation) restored and Earl of Surrey, 1514
John Stourton c. 1454–1485; 3rd Baron Stourton (Baron 1479–1485)	William Stourton c. 1457–1524; 5th Baron Stourton (Baron 1487–1524)	John de Mowbray; 1444–1476; 4th Duke of Norfolk, 7th Earl of Norfolk, 11th Baron Segrave, 10th Baron Mowbray (Duke 1461–1476), Earl of Surrey (Earl 1451–1476)	King Edward IV; 1442–1483	Thomas Howard; 1443–1524; 2nd Duke of Norfolk, 1st Earl of Surrey (Duke 1514–1524)	Humfrey Fitzalan; 1429–1438; 8th (or 13th) Earl of Arundel, 5th Baron Arundel, 5th Baron Maltravers	Thomas Fitzalan; 1450–1524; 10th (or 15th) Earl of Arundel, 7th Baron Arundel, 7th Baron Maltravers
Dukedom of Norfolk, Earldom of Nottingham, Earldom of Surrey extinct, 1476
Duke of Norfolk (3rd creation), Earl of Nottingham (3rd creation), and Earl of Surrey, 1477
Francis Stourton; 1485–1487; 4th Baron Stourton (Baron 1485–1487)	Edward Stourton; 1463–1535; 6th Baron Stourton (Baron 1524–1535)	Anne de Mowbray; 1472–1481; 8th Countess of Norfolk, 12th Baroness Segrave, 11th Baroness Mowbray (Countess 1476–1481)	Richard of Shrewsbury; 1473–1483; Duke of York, Duke of Norfolk, Earl of Nottingham, Earl of Warenne (Duke 1477–1483)	Anne of York; 1475–1511	Thomas Howard; 1473–1554; 3rd Duke of Norfolk, 2nd Earl of Surrey (Duke 1524–1554)	Edmund Howard c. 1478–1539	Elizabeth Boleyn c. 1480–1538	William Fitzalan; 1476–1544; 11th (or 16th) Earl of Arundel, 8th Baron Arundel, 8th Baron Maltravers
Earldom of Norfolk extinct and Baronies Segrave and Mowbray in abeyance, 1481	Dukedom of Norfolk, Earldom of Nottingham, Earldom of Surrey extinct, 1483	Attainted, 1547; Restored, 1553
William Stourton c. 1505–1548; 7th Baron Stourton	Earl of Nottingham (5th creation), 1525	King Henry VIII; 1491–1547	Anne Boleyn c. 1501 or 1507–1536
Viscount Howard of Bindon, 1559
Charles Stourton c. 1520–1557; 8th Baron Stourton	Henry Howard; 1517–1547 styled Earl of Surrey	Thomas Howard c. 1520–1582; 1st Viscount Howard of Bindon	Mary FitzRoy; 1519–1557	Henry FitzRoy; 1519–1536; Duke of Richmond and Somerset, Earl of Nottingham	Catherine Howard c. 1524–1542	Henry Fitzalan; 1512–1580; 12th (or 17th) Earl of Arundel, 9th Baron Arundel, 9th Baron Maltravers
Earldom of Nottingham extinct, 1536
Thomas Howard; 1536–1572; 4th Duke of Norfolk, 3rd Earl of Surrey, 13th Baron Mowbray (Duke 1554–1572)	Henry Howard; 1540–1614; Earl of Northampton	Queen Elizabeth I 1533–1603	Mary FitzAlan; 1540–1557
Dukedom (3rd creation) forfeit, 1572
Earl of Arundel (3rd creation), 1580	Earl of Suffolk (4th creation), 1603
John Stourton; 1553–1588; 9th Baron Stourton	Edward Stourton c. 1555–1633; 10th Baron Stourton	Philip Howard; 1557–1595; 20th/13th/1st Earl of Arundel, styled Earl of Surrey	Thomas Howard; 1561–1626; Earl of Suffolk	Lord William Howard; 1563–1640
Earldom of Arundel and Barony of Mowbray attainted, 1589	see Earls, Marquesses, and Dukes of Suffolk family tree
Earl of Arundel (3rd creation) and Barony of Mowbray restored, 1604; Earl of Norfolk (5th creation), 1644
William Stourton c. 1594–1672; 11th Baron Stourton	Thomas Howard; 1585–1646; 21st/14th/2nd Earl of Arundel, 2nd/4th Earl of Surrey, 1st Earl of Norfolk, 14th Baron Mowbray (Earl 1644–1646)	Philip
see Earls of Shrewsbury family tree
Edward Stourton; 1617–1644	Alethea Talbot; 1585–1654; 17th Baroness Strange of Blackmere, 14th Baroness Talbot, 13th Baroness Furnivall	Henry Frederick Howard; 1608–1652; 22nd/15th/3rd Earl of Arundel, 3rd/5th Earl of Surrey, 2nd Earl of Norfolk, 15th Baron Mowbray (Earl 1646–1652)	William Howard; 1614–1680; Viscount Stafford	William
Duke of Norfolk (4th creation restored), 1660	Baron Howard of Castle Rising, 1669; Earl of Norwich (3rd creation), 1672
William Stourton d. 1685; 12th Baron Stourton	Thomas Howard; 1627–1677; 5th Duke of Norfolk, 21st/14th/2nd Earl of Arundel, 4th/6th Earl of Surrey, 16th Baron Mowbray (Duke 1660–1677) 18th Baron Strange of Blackmere, 15th Baron Talbot, 14th Baron Furnivall (Baron 1654–1677)	Henry Howard; 1628–1684; 6th Duke of Norfolk, 22nd/15th/3rd Earl of Arundel, 5th/7th Earl of Surrey; 18th Baron Strange of Blackmere, 17th Baron Mowbray, 15th Baron Talbot, 14th Baron Furnivall (Duke 1677–1684) 1st Earl of Norwich, etc. (Earl 1672–1684)	Charles Howard; 1630–1713	Col. Bernard Howard; 1641–1717	Charles Howard; 1628–1685; Earl of Carlisle
Edward Stourton; 1665–1720; 13th Baron Stourton	Thomas Stourton; 1667–1744; 14th Baron Stourton	Charles Stourton; 1669–1739	Henry Howard; 1655–1701; 7th Duke of Norfolk, 22nd/15th/3rd Earl of Arundel, 5th/7th Earl of Surrey, 2nd Earl of Norwich, etc. 18th Baron Mowbray, 19th Baron Strange of Blackmere, 15th Baron Talbot, 14th Baron Furnivall (Duke 1684–1701)	Lord Thomas Howard; 1662–1689	Henry Charles Howard d. 1720
Thomas Howard; 1683–1732; 8th Duke of Norfolk, 23rd/16th/4th Earl of Arundel, 6th/8th Earl of Surrey, 3rd Earl of Norwich, etc. 18th Baron Strange of Blackmere, 15th Baron Talbot, 14th Baron Furnivall, 19th Baron Mowbray (Duke 1701–1732)	Edward Howard; 1685–1777; 9th Duke of Norfolk, 24th/17th/5th Earl of Arundel, 7th/9th Earl of Surrey, 4th Earl of Norwich, etc. 20th Baron Mowbray, 20th Baron Strange of Blackmere, 15th Baron Talbot, 14th Baron Furnivall (Duke 1732–1777)	Philip Howard; 1688–1750	Bernard Howard; 1674–1735
Earldom of Norwich (3rd creation) and Barony of Howard of Castle Rising extinct and Baronies of Furnivall, Mowbray, Segrave, Strange of Blackmere, and Talbot abeyant, 1777
Charles Stourton; 1702–1753; 15th Baron Stourton	William Stourton; 1704–1781; 16th Baron Stourton	Winifred Howard; 1726–1753	Anne Howard; 1742–1787	Charles Howard; 1720–1786; 10th Duke of Norfolk, 25th/18th/6th Earl of Arundel, 8th/10th Earl of Surrey (Duke 1777–1786)	Henry Howard; 1713–1787
Charles Philip Stourton; 1752–1816; 17th Baron Stourton	Charles Howard; 1746–1815; 11th Duke of Norfolk, 26th/19th/7th Earl of Arundel, 9th/11th Earl of Surrey (Duke 1786–1815)
William Stourton; 1776–1846; 18th Baron Stourton	Bernard Howard; 1765–1842; 12th Duke of Norfolk, 27th/20th/8th Earl of Arundel, 10th/12th Earl of Surrey (Duke 1815–1842)	Henry Howard-Molyneux-Howard; 1766–1824
Charles Stourton; 1802–1872; 19th Baron Stourton	Henry Howard; 1791–1856; 13th Duke of Norfolk, 28th/21st/9th Earl of Arundel, 11th/13th Earl of Surrey (Duke 1842–1856)	Henry Howard-Molyneux-Howard; 1802–1875
Baron Mowbray and Baron Segrave abeayance restored, 1878	Baron Howard of Glossop, 1869
Alfred Joseph Stourton; 1829–1893; 24th Baron Segrave, 21st/23rd Baron Mowbray, 20th Baron Stourton	Henry Granville Fitzalan-Howard; 1815–1860; 14th Duke of Norfolk, 29th/22nd/10th Earl of Arundel, 12th/14th Earl of Surrey (Duke 1856–1860)	Edward George Fitzalan-Howard; 1818–1883; 1st Baron Howard of Glossop
Baron Howard of Penrith, 1830
Charles Botolph Joseph Stourton; 1867–1936; 25th Baron Segrave, 22nd/24th Baron Mowbray, 21st Baron Stourton	Henry Fitzalan-Howard; 1847–1917; 15th Duke of Norfolk, 30th/23rd/11th Earl of Arundel, 13th/15th Earl of Surrey, Lord Maltravers, Earl of Arundel and Surrey (Duke 1860–1917)	Francis Fitzalan-Howard; 1859–1924; 2nd Baron Howard of Glossop	Esmé Howard; 1863–1939; 1st Baron Howard of Penrith
William Marmaduke Stourton; 1895–1965; 26th Baron Segrave, 23rd/25th Baron Mowbray, 22nd Baron Stourton	Bernard Fitzalan-Howard; 1908–1975; 16th Duke of Norfolk, 31st/24th/12th Earl of Arundel, 14th/16th Earl of Surrey (Duke 1917–1975)	Bernard Edward Fitzalan-Howard; 1885–1972; 3rd Baron Howard of Glossop	Francis Howard; 1905–1999; 2nd Baron Howard of Penrith
Charles Edward Stourton; 1923–2006; 27th Baron Segrave, 24th/26th Baron Mowbray, 23rd Baron Stourton	Miles Fitzalan-Howard; 1915–2002; 17th Duke of Norfolk, 32nd/25th/13th Earl of Arundel, 15th/17th Earl of Surrey, 4th Baron Howard of Glossop (Duke 1975–2002) m. Mary Teresa Constable-Maxwell
Edward William Stephen Stourton; 1953–2021; 28th Baron Segrave, 25th/27th Baron Mowbray, 24th Baron Stourton	Marsha Howard b. 1953	Edward Fitzalan-Howard b. 1956; 18th Duke of Norfolk, 33rd/26th/14th Earl of Arundel, 16th/18th Earl of Surrey, 5th Baron Howard of Glossop (from 2002) m. Georgina Susan Gore	Philip Esmé Howard b. 1945; 3rd Baron Howard of Penrith
Sarah Louise Stourton b. 1982	Isabella Laura Stourton b. 1983	Camilla Charlotte Stourton b. 1987	Francesca Jane Stourton b. 1988	James Charles Peter Stourton b. 1991; 29th Baron Segrave, 26th/28th Baron Mowbray, 25th Baron Stourton	Henry Fitzalan-Howard b. 1987 styled Earl of Arundel and Surrey	Thomas Philip Howard b. 1974
Co-heir presumptive to the Baronies Segrave, Mowbray, and Stourton	Co-heir presumptive to the Baronies Segrave, Mowbray, and Stourton	Co-heir presumptive to the Baronies Segrave, Mowbray, and Stourton	Co-heir presumptive to the Baronies Segrave, Mowbray, and Stourton	Heir apparent to the dukedom	Heir apparent to the Barony Howard of Penrith

== Footnotes ==
Political offices
Preceded by The Lord Dynham	Lord High Treasurer; 1501–1522	Succeeded by The Duke of Norfolk
Preceded by The Duke of York	Earl Marshal; 1509–1524	Succeeded by The Duke of Suffolk
Peerage of England
Preceded by John Howard	Duke of Norfolk; 3rd creation 1514–1524	Succeeded by Thomas Howard
New creation	Earl of Surrey; 3rd creation 1483–1514	Succeeded by Thomas Howard
