= Isabel de Warenne =

English countess and religious patron

Isabel de Warenne, Countess of Arundel (c. 1228 – 23 November 1282) was an English peer. She was widowed when she was about 17 years old, with a large estate, upon which she founded a Cistercian order convent, England's only convent to be Cistercian at the time of its founding. In 1252, she rebuked King Henry III for not paying her money she was owed.

== Early life ==
Isabel was born between 1226 and 1230, her father was William de Warenne, 5th Earl of Surrey and her mother was Maud Marshal, Countess of Norfolk, both of whom had been widowed previously and married in 1225. The de Warenne's also had a son in 1231, John de Warenne, 6th Earl of Surrey. Through her grandfather, Hamelin Plantagenet, the illegitimate half-brother of Henry II, Isabel was a cousin of king Henry III.

In 1234, somewhere between the ages of eight and 12, she was married to Hugh d’Aubigny, 5th Earl of Arundel. The couple moved to Marham, Norfolk, where her father had granted them a manor worth £40 a year in rent.

== Widowhood ==
D'Aubigny died on 7 May 1243, by which time her father and uncles had died, leaving her as a teenage widow with a small fortune. She retained the title "Countess of Arundel", despite the Arundel estates being distributed amongst D'Aubigny's sisters. On 29 May 1243 a proposal for her second marriage was granted to a favourite of the King, the Savoyard Pierre de Genevre, but she did not remarry. Patent Rolls show that she had provision to remain unmarried if she chose but would have had to make a payment to Pierre to be released.

Isabel became a religious patron and in 1249 she founded Marham Abbey in Norfolk on part of her land, the only female English convent that was part of the Cistercian order at its founding. In 1252, she visited the Cistercian Abbey at Waverley where she consulted with the abbot and granted 4 marks and a cask of wine to the monks.

In 1252, upon the death of Thomas Ingoldsthorpe, King Henry III took possession of his lands. However Thomas was a tenant of de Warenne's, and owed her a quarter of a knight's fee, so she requested the value from the King. Henry refused and so she complained about this behaviour to his face, suggesting that Magna Carta was being ignored. She then left Henry's court, without obtaining permission. Henry would pay back the debt a year later, and forgive the fine that she had been charged in appealing the case, providing that 'she says nothing opprobrious to us as she did when we were at Westminster'.

Isabel died before 23 November 1282 and was buried at Abbey.
