= Marham Abbey =

Former Cistercian nunnery in Norfolk, England

Coordinates: 52.6590°N 0.5218°E

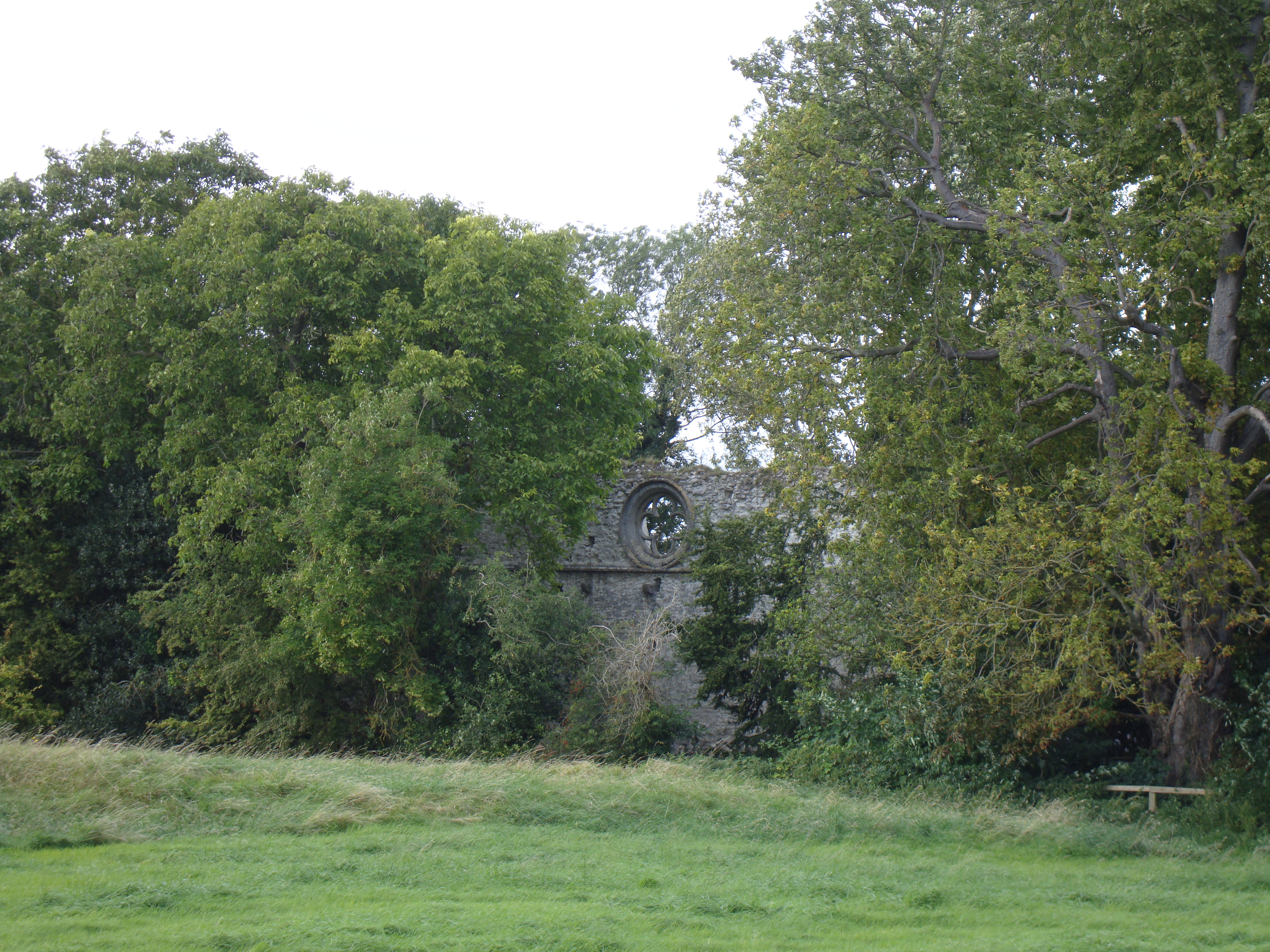
The extant remains of Marham Abbey

Marham Abbey was situated in the village of Marham, southeast of King's Lynn, Norfolk, England. It was founded by Isabel, Countess of Arundel, in 1249 as a monastery for Cistercian nuns and dedicated to St Mary, St Barbara and St Edmund.

Being of little wealth or status, in 1536 the monastery was in the first wave of closures during the Dissolution of the Monasteries and was reportedly in considerable disarray, with the inhabitants accused of disreputable behaviour. The site was granted to Sir Nicholas and John Hare, residents of London.

What little remains of the complex is on private land and consists of some stretches of walling of the church, visible from a nearby main road.
