= Battle of the North Foreland =

Two naval battles of the Anglo-Dutch Wars are called the Battle of the North Foreland after the cape on the Kent coast of England:

- The Battle of the Gabbard, June 12 to June 14, 1653, in the First Anglo-Dutch War.
- The St. James's Day Battle, August 4 to August 5, 1666, in the Second Anglo-Dutch War.

There was also a Battle of South Foreland fought between English and French fleets in 1217.
