= Richard FitzRoy =

13th-century illegitimate son of King John

- Born: c. 1190
- Died: June 1246
- Spouse: Rohese de Dover
- Issue: Richard; Isabella; Lorette
- House: Plantagenet
- Father: John, King of England
- Mother: Adela de Warenne

Richard FitzRoy (c. 1190 – June 1246) (alias Richard de Chilham and Richard de Dover) was the illegitimate son of John, King of England and was feudal baron of Chilham, in Kent. His mother was Adela de Warenne, his father's first cousin and a daughter of Hamelin de Warenne by his wife Isabel de Warenne, 4th Countess of Surrey.

Richard served in his father's army as a captain during the baronial revolt. In 1216 he was made constable of Wallingford Castle. The following year he took a prominent part in a naval battle off the Kent coast.

Richard had scutage for Poitou in 1214. By right of his wife he became Lord of Chingford, Little Wyham and Great Wenden, all in Essex, and Lesnes, Kent, and Lutton, Northamptonshire. However, in 1229 their manor of Chingford Earls was temporarily in the hands of a creditor, Robert de Winchester. In 1242 they leased the advowson of Chingford to William of York, Provost of Beverley.

Before 11 May 1214, Richard married Rohese de Dover, daughter and heiress of Fulbert de Dover by his spouse Isabel, daughter of William Briwere. Their children were:

1. Richard de Dover, feudal baron of Chilham, married Matilda, 6th Countess of Angus
2. Isabella, married 1247 Sir Maurice de Berkeley of Berkeley, Gloucestershire.
3. Lorette (d. bef. 1265), married 1248 Sir William Marmion, 2nd Baron Marmion of Winteringham and of Tanfield, Yorkshire.

Richard's widow remarried, between 1250 and 1253, William de Wilton (killed at the Battle of Lewes), a prominent justice. She died shortly before 11 February 1261, when there was a grant of her lands and heirs to the Queen, Eleanor of Provence. Rohese's heart was buried at Lesnes Abbey.

== Bibliography ==
- Cassidy, Richard (2011). "Rose of Dover (d.1261), Richard of Chilham and an Inheritance in Kent" (PDF). Archaeologia Cantiana. 131. Archived from the original (PDF) on 13 September 2015.
- Given-Wilson & Curteis. The Royal Bastards of Medieval England, 1995
- Oxford University Press, Oxford Dictionary of National Biography, 2004
- Richardson, Douglas (2011). Everingham, Kimball G. (ed.). Plantagenet Ancestry: A Study In Colonial And Medieval Families. Royal Ancestry Series. Vol. 1 (2nd ed.). Salt Lake City, Utah. ISBN 9781461045137.
- Turner, G.J. (1929). "Notes for Richard fitz Roy". The Genealogist. XXII.
