= Eustace the Monk =

Medieval French monk-turned-outlaw

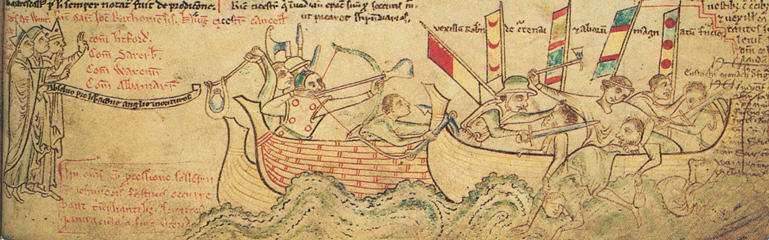
Eustace's death at the 1217 Battle of Sandwich (13th-century illustration by Matthew Paris)

Eustace the Monk (Old French: Eustache le Moine; c. 1170 – 24 August 1217), born Eustace Busket, was a French pirate and mercenary, one of the most famous pirates of the early 13th century, in the grand tradition of medieval outlaws. The birthplace of Eustace was not far from Boulogne, France. A 1243 document mentions a Guillaume le Moine, seigneur de Course, which indicates that the family lived in that vicinity.

An extraordinary, formidable, and provocative figure, he long appeared as a highway robber. He became entangled in the conflict between the Capetians and the Plantagenets, pitting Philip Augustus of France against John, King of England. He regularly switched his allegiance among the two. Defeated and captured by the English at the Battle of Sandwich in 1217, he was beheaded.

== Life ==
=== Early life ===
Eustace was born a younger son of Baudoin Busket, a lord of the county of Boulogne. According to his biography, he went to Toledo, Spain, and studied black magic there. The author of the Histoire des Ducs de Normandie wrote in Eustace's own day, "No one would believe the marvels he accomplished, nor those which happened to him many times." He later returned home to become a Benedictine monk at St Samer Abbey near Calais, and then left the monastery to avenge his murdered father. Other sources, however, suggest that his father died soon after 1190. The same sources mention that by 1202, Eustace was the seneschal and bailiff of the count of Boulogne, Renaud de Dammartin, and that in c. 1204, the two quarrelled and, accused of mishandling his stewardship, Eustace fled and was declared an outlaw. Renaud confiscated his lands and fields; Eustace supposedly burned two mills in retaliation.

=== Serving England ===
Eustace became a pirate in the English Channel and the Strait of Dover, both for his own purposes and as a mercenary of France and England. King John of England employed him intermittently from 1205 to 1212, against Philip II of France. The biography asserts that John gave him command of thirty ships at the start of this assignment. This employment involved Eustace and his brothers raiding the Normandy coast and establishing bases in the Channel Islands (he and his men held Castle Cornet in Guernsey for a considerable period). He took the island of Sark in 1205. When he raided English coastal villages, King John briefly outlawed him, but soon afterwards issued a pardon because he needed Eustace's services.

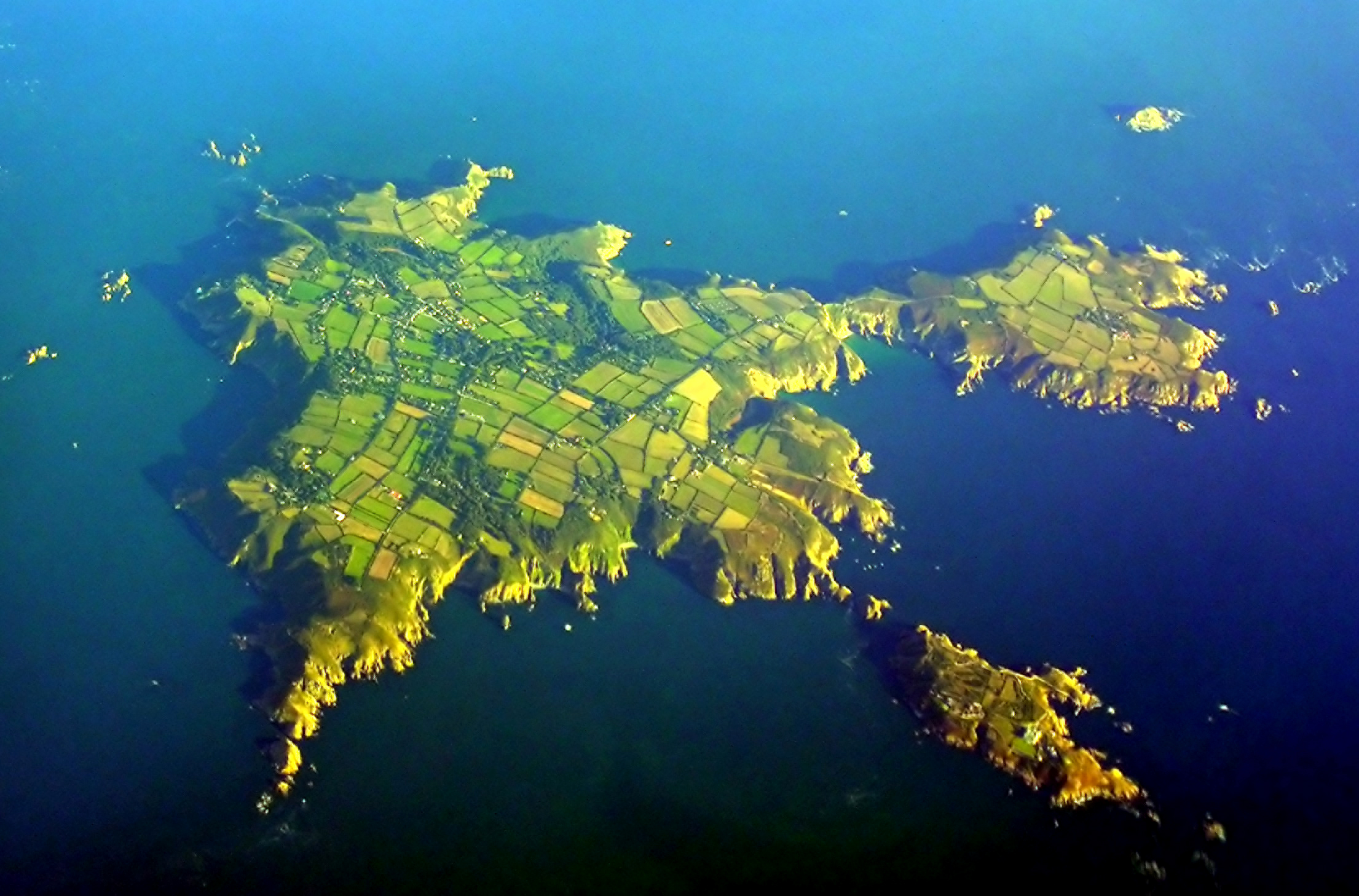
The island of Sark, which Eustace the Monk used as a base of operations for some time

=== Serving France ===
However, Eustace switched sides in 1212 (the biography puts it down to Eustace's enemy Renaud de Dammartin allying himself with John and poisoning John's mind against Eustace) and raided Folkestone when English troops seized his Channel Island bases.

On July 27, 1214, Philip Augustus won the famous Battle of Bouvines. Having succeeded in seizing most of the Plantagenets' continental domains, he considered taking the war to England. Against his adversary, John Lackland, he had secured the support of Pope Innocent III. The fleet and troops gathered in Boulogne. Unfortunately for the King of France, John Lackland suddenly reconciled with the Sovereign Pontiff, and the expedition was called off.

In June 1215, English barons rebelled against John Lackland and offered the English crown to Philip Augustus's son, reigniting the French king's dreams of invading England. This mission was entrusted to the daring pirate.

Eustace the Monk was tasked with establishing a maritime link between the insurgents and the royal troops. He needed to capture Dover. He had a floating fortress built, bristling with trebuchets and other siege engines. As this massive structure advanced among the English ships, hurling projectiles in all directions, panic spread through the enemy camp.

When civil war broke out in England in 1215, he supported the rebel barons and ferried Prince Louis of France across the Channel to help them in 1216.

But in 1217, with the young Henry III succeeding his late father, John Lackland, on the English throne, a new attempt to invade England was being prepared.

In August 1217, whilst ferrying much-needed reinforcements to Louis, Eustace met an English fleet under Hubert de Burgh sailing out of Dover. In the ensuing Battle of Dover, Eustace wrought havoc among his former allies, until the English blinded the French with powdered lime. English troops boarded his ships and defeated his men in hand-to-hand combat. Eustace, his flagship and some other ships managed to escape, but his ship was surrounded on 24 August 1217 in the Battle of Sandwich by Philip d'Aubigny's English fleet of Cinque Ports ships. Eustace was found hiding in the ship's bilges and offered huge sums for his life, which his captors refused, since he had made himself so hated by the English crews. Instead, they allowed him merely the choice between the ship's rail or the side of the trebuchet (carried as deck-cargo to England) as his execution site. (Matthew Paris includes the beheading but does not specify which he chose.) His head was mounted on a pike and paraded as a trophy throughout southern England. Thus perished in battle the first great pirate of the Opal Coast. His brothers survived, and continued to hold his Channel Islands base.

=== Aftermath ===
In June 1217, during the negotiations for what would be known as the Treaty of Lambeth, the English demanded the return of the Channel Islands from Eustace's control, forcibly if necessary. However, he was executed while negotiations were still ongoing and thereafter the negotiations concerned his brothers, with the same demand. The treaty eventually compelled Louis not only to give up his claim to the English throne but also to eject Eustace's brothers from the Channel Islands.

== Biography ==
A romance biography of him was written between 1223 and 1284 by an unknown poet from Picardy, mainly interested in his year or so of adventures after leaving Renaud's service. This account tells of Eustace, from a forest hideout, duping, ambushing and humiliating Renaud again and again, in different disguises and often stealing his horses. It is linked to the medieval myths of Robin Hood and the 13th-century Old French romance Fouke le Fitz Waryn on the life of Fulk FitzWarin.

This account is then supplemented from 1205 onwards by English government records.

=== Legacy ===
==== Mangas ====
Eustace served as the main inspiration for the murderous Friar Bellows from the first season of the British television show Blackadder. Eustace was one of two pirates who directly inspired the character Eustass Kid from the Japanese Anime/Manga One Piece (the other being William Kidd).

==== Comics ====
The famous Italian comic artist Hugo Pratt borrowed his concept of the mysterious pirate leader entrenched on an island in the Indian Ocean, known as “the Monk”, for The Ballad of the Salty Sea, the first adventure of Corto Maltese.

In 1964, Belgian comics magazine Le Journal de Tintin published a comic strip titled Eustache le Moine, Corsaire du Roi (Eustace the Monk, the King’s Privateer), which told the story of Eustace.

==== Video games ====
In the mobile video game Assassin’s Creed: Pirates, one of the secondary characters is named Eustache the Monk. He is depicted as someone who spread terror in the English Channel during the 13th century.

In the PC video game Star Citizen, Eustache the Monk is a sharpshooter and fighter pilot. Recognisable by his loyal Arrow and P4, he is known as a formidable adversary in the game.
