= Yorkshire rebellion of 1489 =

Rebellion against Henry VII of England

The Yorkshire rebellion took place in England in 1489, during the reign of King Henry VII. Relatively little is known about this rebellion; its main account is found in Polydore Vergil's Anglica Historia.

== Prelude ==
Parliament granted Henry VII a subsidy of £100,000 to help defend Brittany, an ally of England in its war against France. King Henry sent Henry Percy, 4th Earl of Northumberland to collect taxes to help raise more money for this campaign. However, many of the people in Northumberland and Yorkshire claimed to have already paid their part through local taxes. They were unwilling to give more money to defend a country of no geographical threat to them, as Yorkshire and Northumberland are in Northern England, whereas Brittany is closer to Cornwall and London. The people of the North had also been affected by a poor harvest in 1488, already subjecting them to financial difficulty. After having to pay for military action in Scotland, they were far less able to do so again.

== Rebellion ==
Rebellion broke out in April 1489. The Earl of Northumberland met with the rebels, but a scuffle broke out and he was killed. The rebels then asked for pardon, but were denied it by the king who sent a large army of 8,000 to the north, led by Thomas, Earl of Surrey. The rebels dispersed and the rebel leader, John à Chambre, was hanged for treason, so they found a new leader in Sir John Egremont (an illegitimate member of the House of Percy). Unfortunately for the rebels, Egremont proved to be unreliable and fled to the Court of Margaret, Duchess of Burgundy, a staunch opposer to Henry's rule.

== Aftermath ==
The results of this rebellion led the rebels to receive a royal pardon, and no further taxes were collected; thus Henry was unable to raise enough money to defend Brittany. He also became aware of the lawless nature of the North of England, which had been loyal to King Richard III, who had spent more time in the North than any previous King of England.

Thomas Howard, Earl of Surrey, who was sent to deal with the Yorkist threat, was made Henry's Lieutenant in the North. With no estates or interests in the north, Surrey was able to spend many years reconciling the region to Tudor rule. For the remainder of his reign, Henry faced no more significant rebellions in Northern England.
