= Adela de Warenne =

Anglo-Angevin noblewoman (born c. 1170)

- Born: c. 1170
- Died: ?
- Children: Richard FitzRoy
- Parent(s): Hamelin de Warenne, Earl of Surrey; Isabel de Warenne, 4th Countess of Surrey
- Relatives: William de Warenne, 5th Earl of Surrey (brother), Geoffrey Plantagenet, Count of Anjou (paternal grandfather), William de Warenne, 3rd Earl of Surrey (maternal grandfather), Adela of Ponthieu, Countess of Surrey (maternal grandmother)

Adela de Warenne (c. 1170 – ?) was an Anglo-Angevin noblewoman and the mistress of her half-first cousin King John.

== Family ==
Adela was born about 1170. She had a brother, William de Warenne, 5th Earl of Surrey and two sisters.

Adela's father was Hamelin de Warenne, Earl of Surrey, the illegitimate son of Geoffrey of Anjou, Count of Anjou, who was born when Geoffrey was estranged from his wife, Empress Matilda. He was the half-brother of King Henry II of England and was loyal to his brother. He became jure uxoris Earl of Surrey on his marriage and adopted his wife's surname de Warenne.

Adela's mother was Isabel de Warenne, 4th Countess of Surrey, the widow of William of Blois, Count of Boulogne, the second son of Stephen, King of England and Matilda I, Countess of Boulogne. Isabel was of the wealthiest heiresses in England as the only surviving child of William de Warenne, 3rd Earl of Surrey and his wife, Adela of Ponthieu, Countess of Surrey.

== Marriages ==
Adela married firstly Robert de Newburgh.

Adela married second, William Fitz-William of Sprotborough. They had a son, Sir Thomas Fitz-William.

Adela also became "associated with" her half-first cousin King John, as his mistress. They were both grandchildren of Geoffrey V, Count of Anjou by different mothers. They had one illegitimate child Richard FitzRoy, Baron Chilham (c. 1190), also known as Richard of Dover, Richard Fitzroy, Richard Fitz-John and Ricardo filio Regis. He married Rohese de Dover, daughter and heiress of Fulbert de Dover and had issue.
