= Charles Stourton, 8th Baron Stourton =

Arms of Stourton: Sable, a bend or between six fountains

Charles Stourton, 8th Baron Stourton (c. 1520 – 1557) was an English peer who was executed for murder.

== Life ==
He was the eldest son of William Stourton, 7th Baron Stourton and Elizabeth Dudley, daughter of Edmund Dudley, a key adviser to Henry VII. His parents' marriage was unhappy, due largely to his father's liaison with Agnes ap Rhys, or Rice, daughter of Rhys ap Gruffydd and granddaughter of Thomas Howard, 2nd Duke of Norfolk; in their later years, his parents lived apart. To the understandable chagrin of his children, William left almost the whole of the Stourton inheritance to Agnes Rice, resulting in years of litigation between his children and Agnes. Charles was on very bad terms with his father, calling him a "false hypocrite" for whom prison would be too good.

Stourton succeeded his father as baron in 1548. He was a nephew of John Dudley, 1st Duke of Northumberland, as well as a Catholic. A Wiltshire resident, he was asked for help by Mary Tudor in the succession crisis of 1553, but hesitated in supporting her until her victory was clear. In August 1553 he was described as an "archpapist" by a London pamphleteer.

He had a reputation for being quarrelsome and violent, and was clearly regarded as a public nuisance even before he was charged with murder. The legal difficulties and family quarrels caused by his father's affair with Agnes Rice, and his decision to disinherit his children, may to some extent explain Charles's violent temper, although lawsuits over property were then an everyday part of life among the English landed classes.

== Execution for murder ==
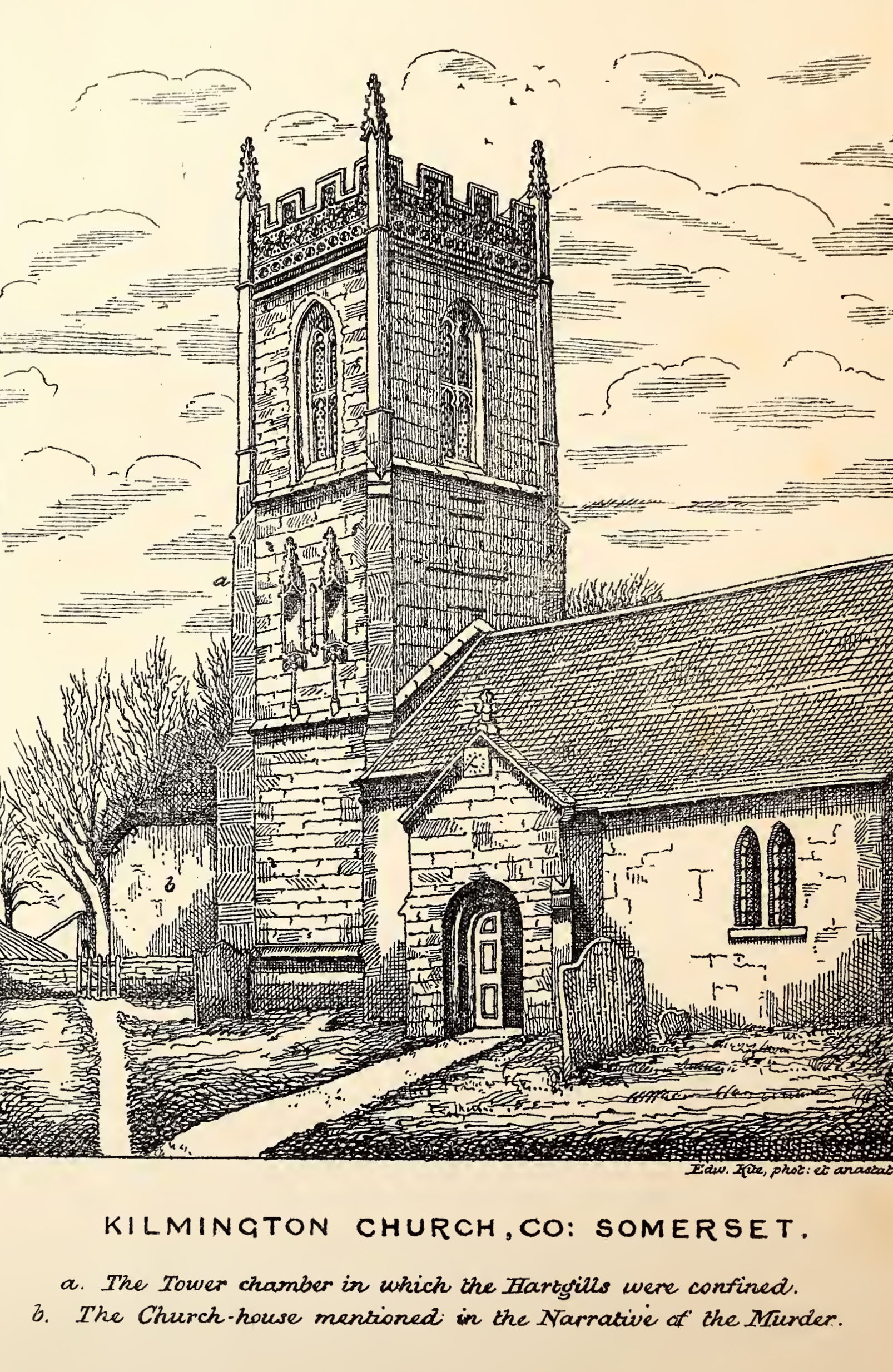
Kilmington Church, showing locations mentioned in an 1864 account of the murder

He was executed, as were four of his servants, on 16 March 1557 at Salisbury, following a trial at Westminster on 28 February previous, for murdering two men, William Hartgill and his son John Hartgill. Stourton had been most reluctant to plead to the indictment, until he was reminded by the judges that he faced the horrific penalty of peine forte et dure (being pressed to death under heavy stones) if he did not.

William Hartgill, described as a "surly and cross old man", was a neighbour with whom Stourton had long been on bad terms. Stourton had quarrelled with his widowed mother, who wished to remarry, and Hartgill had taken Lady Stourton's part in the quarrel. As not infrequently happened in that age, the feud degenerated into a private war, eventually requiring the intervention of Star Chamber. Stourton was fined and ordered to pay damages to the Hartgills: this humiliation seems to have been the motive for the crime. On the pretext of arranging a meeting to pay them the money, Stourton ambushed the Hartgills at Kilmington church, kidnapped them, and had them brought to his house, where after being imprisoned for a time they had their throats cut. Stourton did not actually commit the murders but was found guilty of ordering them.

Before his execution, he is said to have expressed true repentance for this and his other crimes.

== Family ==
Stourton married Lady Anne Stanley, daughter of Edward Stanley, 3rd Earl of Derby and Lady Dorothy Howard.

They had three sons:

- John, who became Baron in 1557.
- Edward, who became Baron in 1588.
- Charles;

and three daughters:

- Mary, who married John Tregian
- Anne, who married Edward Rogers
- Katherine, who married Richard Sherborne.

His widow remarried Sir John Arundell of Lanherne and had further issue. He died in 1590, and she died in 1602.

== Notes ==
Peerage of England
Preceded by William Stourton	Baron Stourton; 1548–1557	Succeeded by John Stourton
