= William Moleyns =

Member of the Parliament of England

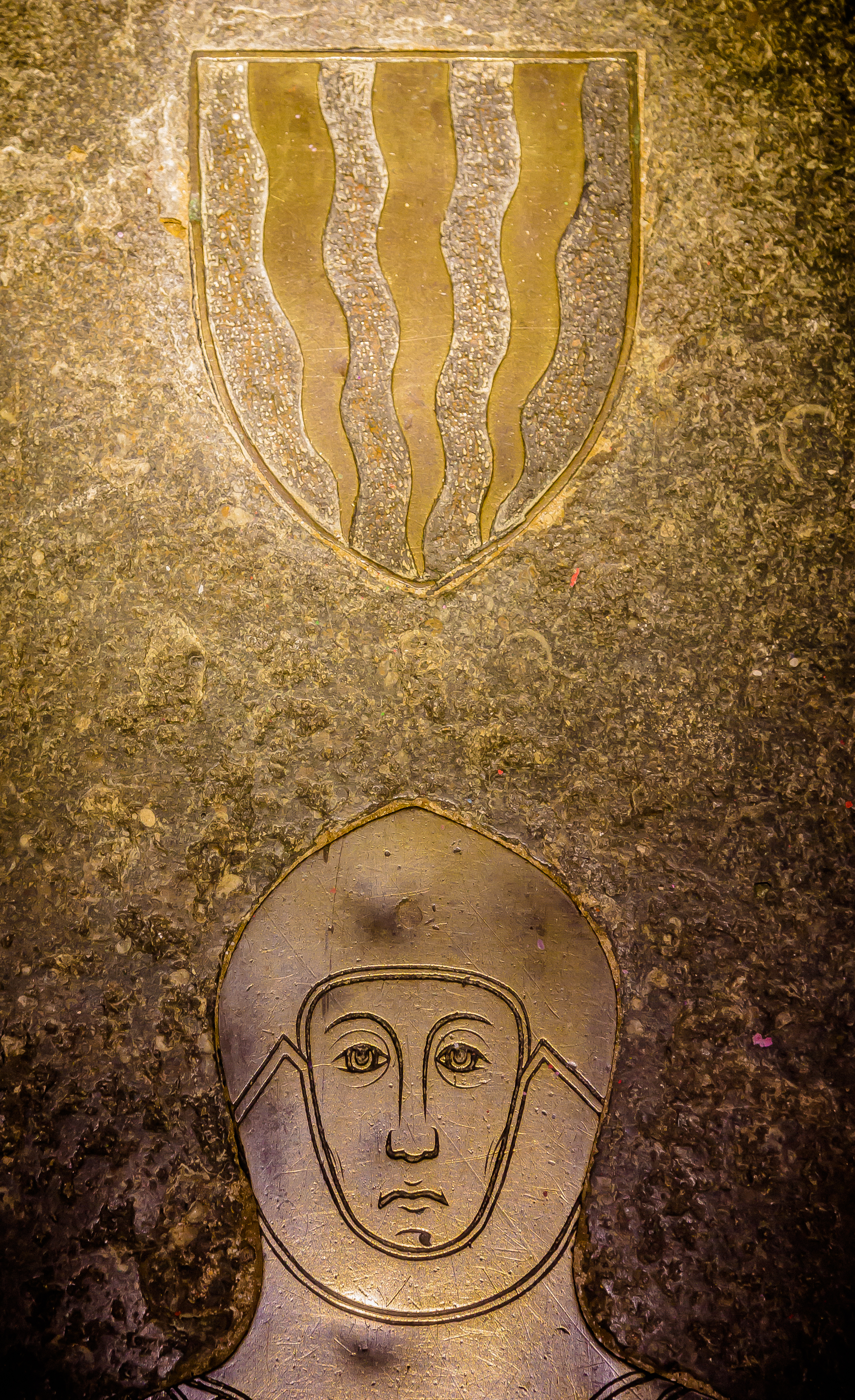
Part of brass memorial of Sir William Moleyns

Sir William Moleyns (7 January 1378 – 8 June 1425) was an English landowner, administrator and politician from Stoke Poges in Buckinghamshire.

== Origins ==
Born in London, he was the son and heir of Sir Richard Moleyns (died 1384), of Stoke Poges. Books in the nineteenth century and self-published websites today claim that he and his paternal ancestors were barons, which is untrue as none were summoned to Parliament. His mother's name was Eleanor, taken to be the daughter of Henry Beaumont, 3rd Baron Beaumont, (died 1369) and his wife Margaret de Vere (died 1398). Eleanor's brother is John Beaumont, 4th Baron Beaumont

== Career ==
His father died when he was only four years old and he did not inherit his father's lands until he reached majority in 1399. Shortly after, he also inherited the lands of his grandfather, the MP Sir William Moleyns (died 1381), which had been held for life by his widow Margery (died 1399), daughter of Sir Edmund Bacon. This made him the owner of ten manors in Buckinghamshire, six in Wiltshire and three in Oxfordshire, with a substantial income. He also had lands in Norfolk.

He was soon involved in local government in Buckinghamshire, being appointed to commissions on defence and finance, and in 1419 was made a justice of the peace for the county. In 1413 he was knighted by the new king Henry V and in April 1414 was elected as an MP of the Parliament of England for Wiltshire.

== Death and memorial ==
He died on 8 June 1425 and was buried in the church of St Giles at Stoke Poges. On the north side of the altar on a memorial brass are the images of a knight and his lady, with their arms above and an inscription in Latin below:

Hic iacent Willielmus Molyns miles qui obiit viii die mensis junii anno domini mccccxxv et Domina Margeria uxor eius quorum animabus propicietur deus amen (Here lie William Moleyns, knight, who died the eighth day of the month of June in the year of the Lord 1425, and Dame Margery his wife, whose souls may God have in care. Amen)

The arms over the lady are blazoned: Or, three piles wavy Gules (Ancient Molyns), impaling Argent, three bends Gules within a bordure Sable bezantée (Whalesborough), while those over the knight are blazoned: Or, three piles wavy Gules (Ancient Molyns).

== Marriage and family ==
By 29 September 1401 he was married to a woman from Cornwall called Margery, who died on 26 March 1439. Her family name is unclear, with some sources naming it as Whalesborough. Their children were:

- Catherine (died 1465), who married John Howard, 1st Duke of Norfolk.
- Anne, who married Lewis Clifford.
- John.
- William, the heir, who was born in December 1405 and in 1417 was married to Catherine, daughter of the MP Thomas Fauconer. She died before 1 May 1423 when, at Ewelme, he married Anne (died 1468), possibly his first cousin, the daughter of the MP Sir John III Whalesborough (died 1418), of Whalesborough in Marhamchurch, and his wife Joan, daughter of the MP Sir John Raleigh (died 1372), of Nettlecombe, and half-sister of Maud Burghersh, wife of the poet's son and MP Thomas Chaucer. William died at the Siege of Orléans on 8 May 1429, and Anne married secondly the MP Sir Edmund Hampden (died 1471). Her daughters were:

Eleanor (1426–1476), the heiress, who married Robert Hungerford, 3rd Baron Hungerford, created Baron Moleyns in 1445. One of her godmothers was Thomas Chaucer's daughter Alice.
Frideswide.
