= Battle of Sandwich (1217) =

Battle of the First Barons' War

Coordinates: 51.275°N 1.420°E

- Part of First Barons' War
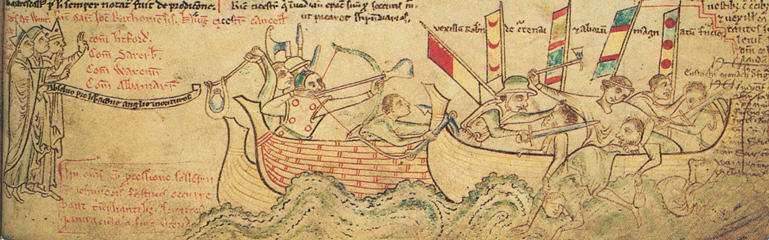
- The Battle of Sandwich, showing the capture of the French flagship and the killing of Eustace the Monk
Date	24 August 1217
Location	Off Sandwich, Kent, United Kingdom
Result	English victory

Belligerents
Kingdom of England	Kingdom of France

Commanders and leaders
Hubert de Burgh; Philip d'Aubigny; Richard FitzRoy	Robert, Lord of Champignelles; Eustace the Monk (executed)

Strength
16–18 large ships 20 smaller ships	10 large ships 70 supply vessels

Casualties and losses
Unknown	1 large ship, 36 knights 64 supply vessels

The Battle of Sandwich, also called the Battle of Dover took place on 24 August 1217 as part of the First Barons' War. A Plantagenet English fleet commanded by Hubert de Burgh attacked a Capetian French fleet led by Eustace the Monk and Robert of Courtenay off Sandwich, Kent. The English captured the French flagship and most of the supply vessels, forcing the rest of the French fleet to return to Calais.

The French fleet was attempting to bring supplies and reinforcements to Prince Louis, later King Louis VIII of France, whose French forces held London at that time. The English vessels attacked from windward, seizing Eustace's ship, making Robert and the knights prisoner and killing the rest of the crew. Eustace, a notorious pirate, was executed after being taken prisoner. The battle convinced Prince Louis to abandon his effort to conquer England and the Treaty of Lambeth was signed a few weeks later.

== Background ==
Eustace the Monk once belonged to a monastic order, but he broke his vows and became a pirate along with his brothers and friends. His early successes at this endeavor attracted many lawless men and his pirates became a menace to shipping in the English Channel. The English opponents of Eustace credited the man with "diabolical ingenuity".

From 1205 to 1208, Eustace worked for King John I of England. With the English sovereign's blessing he seized the Channel Islands and was allowed to hold them for John, while using Winchelsea as his English base. In 1212, Eustace switched his allegiance to France and was chased out of England. The year 1215 saw his ships transporting war engines to the English barons who opposed John. When Prince Louis sailed for London, he went in Eustace's fleet. It was thanks to Eustace's help that Louis was able to quickly capture London and the Cinque Ports.

After his lieutenants were badly defeated at the Battle of Lincoln on 20 May 1217, Prince Louis raised his siege of Dover Castle and retired to London. Signalling his willingness to negotiate an end to the struggle, he agreed to meet at Brentford with adherents of the boy-king Henry III of England. The victor of Lincoln, William Marshal, 1st Earl of Pembroke and Louis came close to an agreement. However, in order to pardon the bishops who had gone over to Louis' cause, Pope Honorius III's acquiescence was required. Since this was not possible without a long journey to Rome, the negotiations broke down. Louis received the news that reinforcements and supplies would soon arrive from France. Encouraged, he resolved to fight on.

Louis had been invited to land with troops in England by the English barons in revolt against the tyranny of King John and this was not a war of nations but of factions.

== Battle ==
On 24 August, in clear weather, the French fleet set out from Calais. Though the ships were equipped by Eustace the Monk, command of the knights and soldiers was held by Robert of Courtenay. The wife of Prince Louis, Blanche of Castile was also an important organizer of the relief effort. Opposing the French was Philip d'Aubigny, commander of the southeastern coast. The Earl of Pembroke had arrived at New Romney on 19 August and summoned the sailors of the Cinque Ports. The English mariners complained bitterly of bad treatment at the hands of King John, but Pembroke convinced them to fight with the promise of great spoils should they defeat the French.

Eustace's own vessel, the Great Ship of Bayonne led the French squadron. Robert de Courtenay held the top command while Eustace served as his deputy. Ralph de la Tourniele and William des Barres were third and fourth in command, respectively. All told, there were 36 knights on the flagship. The next three troopships were commanded by Mikius de Harnes, William V of Saint-Omer, and the Mayor of Boulogne. Altogether, the first four ships, including the flagship, contained between 100 and 125 knights. Men-at-arms manned the remaining six troopships. There were 70 smaller vessels which carried supplies. All eleven troopships were overloaded, particularly the flagship which carried a large trebuchet and horses destined for Prince Louis.

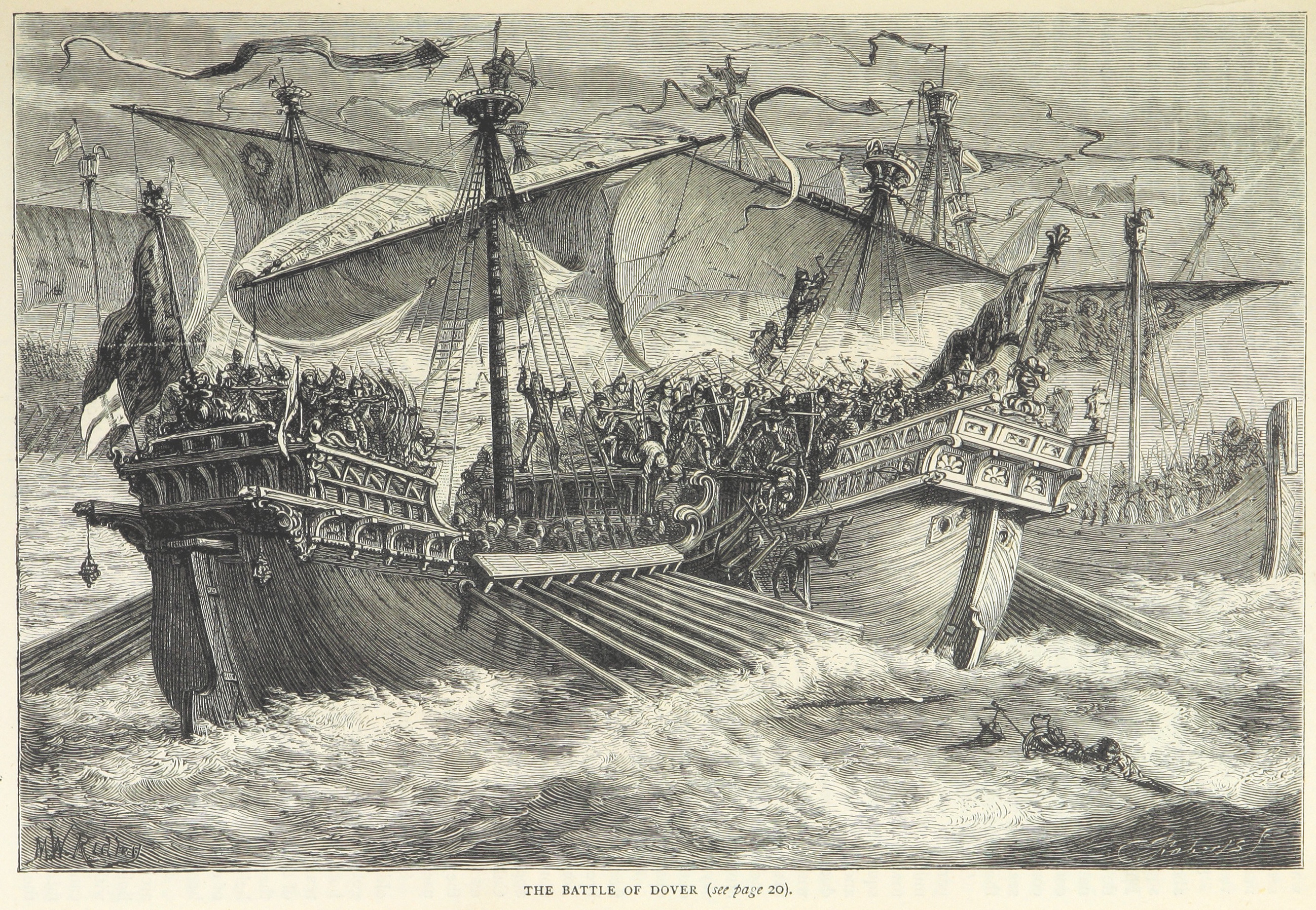
An 1873 illustration of the battle

The English ships were generally smaller than the French, except for a substantial cog provided by the Earl of Pembroke, who was persuaded to stay ashore. As justiciar, Hubert de Burgh claimed leadership of the fleet, which has sometimes led to him being included anachronistically on lists of the lord high admirals. All told there were no more than 40 English ships, 16–18 larger ships and 20 smaller vessels. King John's illegitimate son Richard FitzRoy commanded one ship.

The English, who had recovered Sandwich from Louis' forces, determined to let the French armada pass by before attacking. When the French sailed past Sandwich, de Burgh's fleet issued from the port. The French fleet, which sailed in close order toward the Thames estuary, held the windward position at first. De Burgh's ship, which was in the lead, lunged at the French in a feint attack, but veered away when threatened. Against the advice of his admiral Eustace, the overconfident Robert of Courtenay ordered the French to attack. As the French shortened sail, the English ships gained the windward position and attacked. Meanwhile, de Burgh's flagship sailed independently to attack the French from the rear, eventually capturing two French vessels.

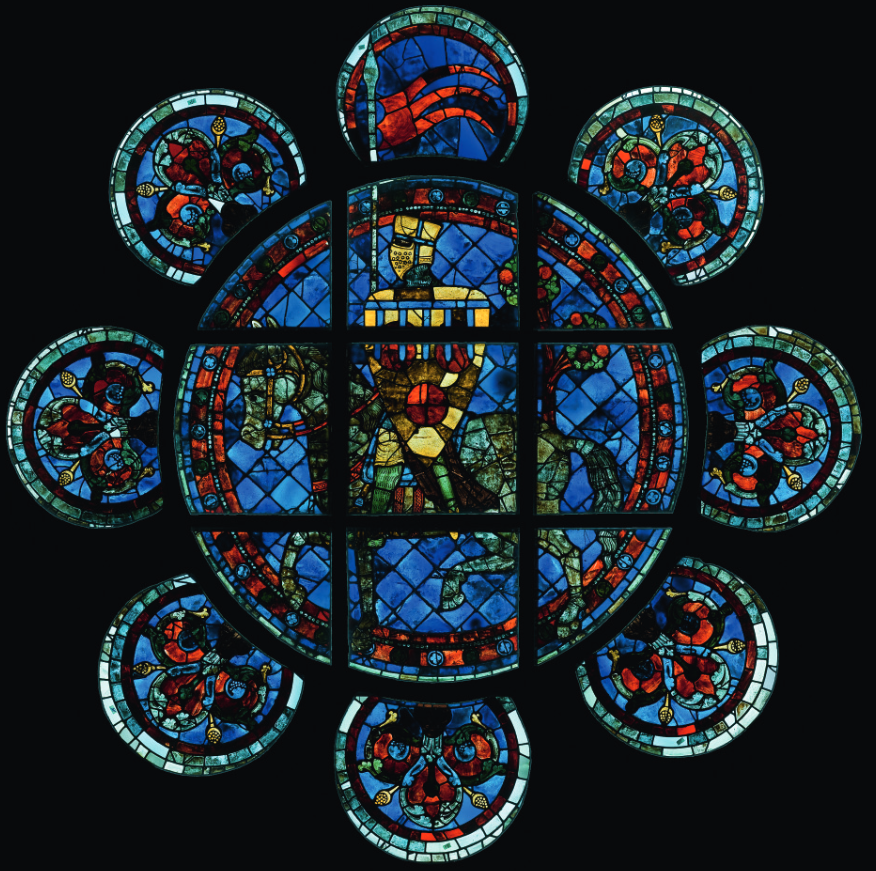
Stained Glass of Robert of Courtenay, Chartres Cathedral

Aided by their upwind position, the English archers inflicted considerable damage on the enemy sailors and soldiers before the French bowmen were able to effectively reply. The English also opened pots of lime which blew in the faces of the French. Early in the battle, the French flagship engaged Richard FitzRoy's ship. As more English ships came up, they joined the fight against the flagship, while the other French ships maintained their tight formation, but failed to assist their flagship.

Pembroke's cog and FitzRoy's ship grappled Eustace's flagship, one on each side. After a one-sided melee, Robert of Courtenay and the French knights were captured for ransom, while the French sailors and common soldiers were massacred. Eustace, dragged from his hiding place in the bilge, offered to pay 10,000 marks as ransom. Though his very high price was tempting, FitzRoy and the other English leaders considered Eustace a turncoat because of the pirate's employment by King John. Marked for execution by the enraged English, Eustace was tied down and a man named Stephen Crabbe struck off his head with one blow.

With their flagship taken, the French fleet headed back to Calais. Encouraged, the English attacked, using ramming, grappling, and rigging-cutting to disable the enemy vessels. The nine surviving troopships got away, but most of the smaller vessels fell prey to the English mariners. As few as 15 ships escaped from the rampaging English. The French troopships owed their deliverance to their train of supply vessels because the English turned aside to plunder the smaller craft. The French sailors were slaughtered or thrown into the Channel, except for two or three men on each captured vessel who were spared.

== Result ==
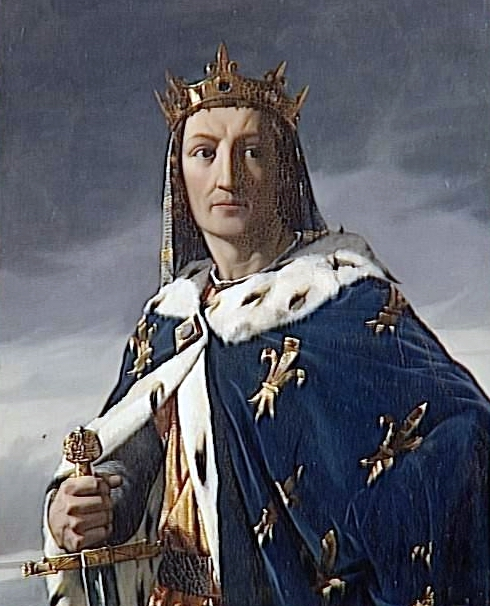
Prince Louis

A large part of the loot passed to the English sailors while some was used to set up the Hospital of Saint Bartholomew at Sandwich. Historian Thomas B. Costain calls the English victory decisive. Before the battle Prince Louis was short of supplies. With the English in control of the Channel, Louis was totally cut off from his French logistic base. His allies among the English barons wanted a settlement and amnesty for themselves.

Peace was signed on 12 September at Kingston upon Thames. Prince Louis formally renounced his claims to the English crown in return for being allowed an unmolested departure from England. A few of Henry's supporters held out for unconditional surrender, but the Earl of Pembroke successfully argued for the more moderate terms. In return for Henry III's pardon, the barons who had joined Louis were made to pay the French prince 10,000 marks to expedite his withdrawal. Prince Louis left Dover before the end of the month.
