= William de Warenne, 5th Earl of Surrey =

English nobleman and royal official

William de Warenne
- 5th Earl of Surrey
- Predecessor: Isabel de Warenne, 4th Countess of Surrey
- Successor: John de Warenne, 6th Earl of Surrey
- Noble family: Warenne
- Spouse: Maud Marshal
- Issue Detail: John de Warenne, 6th Earl of Surrey; Isabel de Warenne
- Father: Hamelin de Warenne, Earl of Surrey
- Mother: Isabel de Warenne, 4th Countess of Surrey

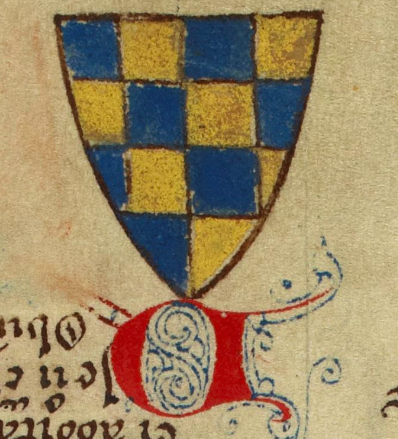
Arms of William de Warenne

William de Warenne, 5th Earl of Surrey (born 1160s–1170s, died 27 May 1240) was the son of Isabel de Warenne, 4th Countess of Surrey (suo jure) and Hamelin de Warenne. His father Hamelin granted him the manor of Appleby, North Lincolnshire.

== Origins ==
Although he spent most of his life in England he was raised in Normandy. In 1194 William de Warenne was one of those who with Richard I of England licensed the reopening of tournament circuits in England. Through his grandfather Geoffrey Plantagenet, Count of Anjou he was cousin to kings Richard and John. His father Hamelin de Warenne was son of Geoffrey Plantagenet who married Isabel de Warenne and adopted the surname. Therefore, he inherited royal connections through his paternal line and the Earldom of Surrey through his maternal line, a very powerful combination. De Warenne was present at the coronation of John, King of England on 27 May 1199. When Normandy was lost to the French in 1204 he lost his Norman holdings (in 1202 he was lieutenant of Gascony), but John recompensed him with lordship over the important towns of Grantham and Stamford. Such generous grants were not surprising for a royal cousin who posed no threat to the throne and as his sister Adela de Warenne was one of John's mistresses.

== Tournament ==
Based on an example letter, which was likely copied from a real letter, he was in correspondence with William de Forz, 3rd Earl of Albemarle whom he considered a great knight and whom he wanted to join his tournament team some time between 1210 and 1240. The letter reads:

The earl of Warenne to the count of Aumale, greetings. That which ceases from use has prepared the way for its own retirement. We knights are being kept from action like unskilled clodhoppers; this long interval of sitting around, which prevents the practice of knightly exercise, gives one kidney stones. You will have heard that a certain tournament has been sworn between us and O., the earl of such-and-such a place. We beg you with our utmost affection to come to it. Since we are unfit, we trust in your integrity as to a city; to your triumphal banner as to a castle with its walls and surrounding moat, which is accustomed to be the refuge of the weary and of those oppressed by an adverse fate. And those who are accustomed to our protection in the best possible manner have committed themselves to being defended [by] the might of your protection. We also desire your presence there all the more because we believe it will be essential to us.

== Lord Warden of the Cinque Ports ==
His first tenure of office as Lord Warden of the Cinque Ports began in 1204, and lasted until 1206; he was again appointed as Warden in 1214. He was also a Warden of the Welsh Marches between 1208 and 1213. Between the years 1200 and 1208, and between 1217 and 1226 he was to serve as the High Sheriff of Surrey.

== Loyalist during the Rebellion ==
De Warenne was one of the few barons who remained loyal to his cousin, King John. In 1212, when a general rebellion was feared, John committed to him the custody of the northern shires. During the king's difficulties with the barons, when they sought for the French prince to assume the English throne, William is listed as one of those who advised John to accede to Magna Carta. His allegiance only faltered a few times when the king's cause looked hopeless; shortly before the death of John, he made terms with Prince Louis. In March 1217 he again demonstrated his loyalty to England by supporting the young King Henry III, and he was also responsible for the establishment of Salisbury Cathedral. He refers to Hubert de Burgh in a letter from 1218 as his dearest friend and lord "sicut dominum et amicum carissimum".

However, he disliked the royal favorites who came into power after 1227, and used his influence to protect Hubert de Burgh when the latter had been removed from office by their efforts in 1232. Warenne's relations with the king became strained in course of time. In 1238 he was evidently regarded as a leader of the baronial opposition, for the Great Council appointed him as one of the treasurers who were to prevent the king from squandering the subsidy voted in that year.

== Marriage and issue ==
William married Maud Marshal, widow of Hugh Bigod, 3rd Earl of Norfolk, on 13 October 1225. They had one son, John, and a daughter, Isabel. John (1231–1304) succeeded his father as earl, while Isabel (c. 1228 – 1282) married Hugh d'Aubigny, 5th Earl of Arundel. William may also have had an earlier, childless marriage to another Maud, daughter of William d'Aubigny, 2nd Earl of Arundel.

Political offices
Preceded by Unknown	Lord Warden of the Cinque Ports; 1204–1206; 1214	Succeeded by Hubert de Burgh
Peerage of England
Preceded by Hamelin de Warenne	Earl of Surrey; 1202–1240	Succeeded by John de Warenne
