= Isabel de Warenne, Countess of Surrey =

Anglo-Norman noblewoman (c. 1137–1203)

Isabel de Warenne
- 4th Countess of Surrey
- Predecessor: William de Warenne, 3rd Earl of Surrey
- Successor: William de Warenne, 5th Earl of Surrey
- Noble family: Warenne
- Spouse: Hamelin Plantagenet
- Issue Detail: William de Warenne, 5th Earl of Surrey; Adela de Warenne
- Father: William de Warenne, 3rd Earl of Surrey
- Mother: Adela of Ponthieu

Isabel de Warenne, 4th Countess of Surrey (c. 1130 – 1203) was an English peer. She was the only surviving heir of William de Warenne, 3rd Earl of Surrey, and his wife, Adela, the daughter of William III of Ponthieu.

== Life ==
Isabel was the great-granddaughter of the first Norman earl, William, and his Flemish wife Gundred. When her father died in the Holy Land in January 1148 she inherited the earldom of Surrey and was married in around 1153 to William of Blois, the younger son of King Stephen, who became earl in her right. The marriage occurred at a critical moment in The Anarchy as part of King Stephen's attempt to control the de Warenne lands.The couple did not have any children and William died in 1159.

William FitzEmpress, younger brother of King Henry II, sought Isabel's hand in 1162 or 1163, but Thomas Becket refused a dispensation from affinity on the grounds of consanguinity. In April 1164, she married Hamelin of Anjou, a natural half-brother of King Henry, who became jure uxoris Earl of Surrey. Isabel died in 1203.

== Family ==
Isabel and her second husband Hamelin had four surviving children:

- William, later 5th Earl of Surrey (1166–1240)
- Adela (born c. 1170, date of death unknown), married first Robert of Naburn and secondly William FitzWilliam of Sprotborough.
- Isabel, married first Robert de Lacy and secondly Gilbert de l'Aigle, Lord of Pevensey.
- Matilda, married first Henry, Count of Eu and Lord of Hastings and secondly Henry de Stuteville.

Peerage of England
Preceded by William de Warenne	Countess of Surrey; 1148–1203	Succeeded by Hamelin de Warenne
