= John Stourton, 9th Baron Stourton =

John Stourton
- Born: 1553; England
- Occupation(s): John Stourton, 9th Baron Stourton
- Known for: 9th Baron Stourton

Arms of Stourton: Sable, a bend or between six fountains

John Stourton, 9th Baron Stourton (1553–1588) was the elder son of Charles Stourton, 8th Baron Stourton by his wife Anne Stanley, a daughter of Edward Stanley, 3rd Earl of Derby. His father was executed for murder when he was a small child. As this was a felony rather than treason, the title and estate passed to John as his eldest son.

== Life ==
He was summoned to parliament as Lord Stourton in 1575. Owing to some confusion about his status as a result of his father's execution, an act of restitution of blood was passed by the Lords. When the Commons attempted to enter additional clauses, probably because of his Catholicism, the act was dropped. Despite his personal belief, he was loyal to Elizabeth I and attended Protestant services, particularly when at Court. He was one of the peers who tried Mary, Queen of Scots, although he later confessed his regret for his involvement. His name subsequently appeared several times in the Confession of Anthony Tyrrell.

He married ca. 1580 Frances Brooke (b. 12 January 1562), daughter of Sir George Brooke, 10th Baron Cobham, by his second wife Frances Newton. They had no children.

In July 1588 he informed the Privy Council that he had furnished six lances and fourteen light horses and was prepared to go with them for the defence of the realm. However, he died shortly after at Stourton on 13 October 1588, unattended by a priest but confessing his Catholic faith.

He was succeeded by his brother Edward Stourton, 10th Baron Stourton.

Peerage of England
Preceded by Charles Stourton	Baron Stourton; 1557–1588	Succeeded by Edward Stourton
