= Edward Stourton, 10th Baron Stourton =

Arms of Stourton: Sable, a bend or between six fountains

Edward Stourton, 10th Baron Stourton (c. 1555 – 7 May 1633) was a Catholic English peer.

== Life ==
He was a younger son of Charles Stourton, 8th Baron Stourton and Lady Anne Stanley, daughter of Edward Stanley, 3rd Earl of Derby. He was educated at Exeter College, Oxford, matriculating in 1575. His father was executed for murder in 1557. He succeeded his brother John in 1588.

He made no secret of his adherence to Roman Catholicism.

He was a close friend of Robert Catesby and Catesby's recruitment of Francis Tresham to the Gunpowder Plot took place in Stourton's house in Clerkenwell. He was suspected of deliberately avoiding the opening of parliament, although the conspirators may contrived to delay him without revealing their plans. He was imprisoned in the Tower of London. In 1608 he was transferred to the Fleet Prison and was fined £6,000, although he paid only £1,000. He may subsequently have occasionally attended Church of England services, but continued to house Catholic priests.

He died on 7 May 1633 and was buried at Stourton, Wiltshire.

== Family ==
He married his cousin, Frances Tresham, daughter of Sir Thomas Tresham and Muriel Throckmorton. They had 6 children, who survived infancy:

- William Stourton, 11th Baron Stourton
- Thomas (d. 1669), who fought a duel in 1625. He married the twice widowed Elizabeth Cornwallis, a fellow Catholic. He was buried at Stourton.
- Francis (1599–1638), who married Elizabeth, daughter of Henry Norton of Chediston, Suffolk.
- Edward died unmarried.
- Margaret, who married Sir Thomas Sulyard, Knight, of Wetherden, Suffolk.
- Mary, who married Walter Norton of Sibsey, Lincolnshire.

Peerage of England
| Preceded by John Stourton | Baron Stourton; 1588–1633 | Succeeded by William Stourton |
