= Marham =

Village in Norfolk, England

Coordinates: 52.66078°N 0.52550°E

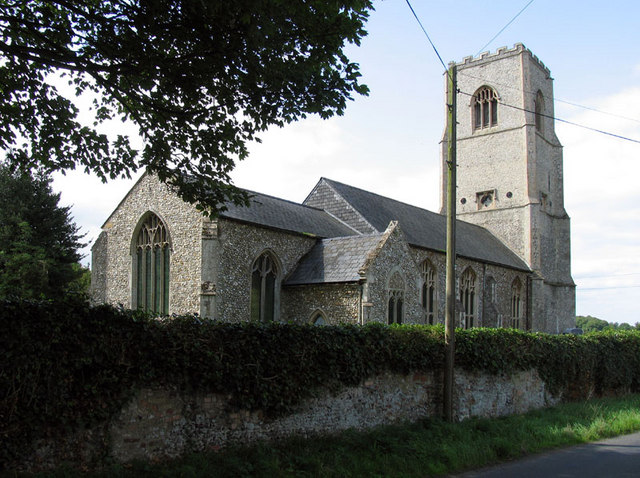
- Holy Trinity church, Marham

- Location within Norfolk
- Area: 14.85 km^{2} (5.73 sq mi)
- Population: 3,531 (2011)
  - Density: 238/km^{2} (620/sq mi)
- OS grid reference: TF 709 100
- Civil parish: Marham
- District: King's Lynn and West Norfolk
- Shire county: Norfolk
- Region: East
- Country: England
- Sovereign state: United Kingdom
- Post town: KING'S LYNN
- Postcode district: PE33
- Dialling code: 01760
- Police: Norfolk
- Fire: Norfolk
- Ambulance: East of England
- UK Parliament: South West Norfolk

Marham is a village and civil parish in the English county of Norfolk, approximate 12 miles (19 km) away from King's Lynn. An RAF station, RAF Marham, is situated nearby at Upper Marham. The village covers an area of 1,485 ha (3,670 acres) and had a population of 2,951 in 788 households as of the 2001 census, increasing to 3,531 at the 2011 Census. The villages name means 'Pool homestead/village' or 'hemmed-in land with a pool'.

== Governance ==
Marham is a parish of the Kings Lynn and West Norfolk district council, which is responsible for the most local services. Norfolk County Council is in charge of roads, some schools, and social services, and the county councillor for the Gayton & Nar Valley division is Graham Middleton (Conservative) since 2017. For Westminster elections Marham forms part of the South West Norfolk constituency.

== Religion ==
Holy Trinity Church of England parish church is a Grade I listed building. It dates from Norman times and has a Norman doorway. Since its original design, each part of the building has been reconstructed. The doorway has a single-scallop shaft on each side. The semi-circular arch is high enough to allow the tympanum within to be filled with a checkered "lozenge" pattern.

Marham Methodist church joins with the Anglicans for some of its services.

== Climate ==
Climate data for RAF Marham, (Note: Weather station is located 10.0 miles (16.1 km) from the King's Lynn centre.) (1991–2020 normals, extremes 1957–present)
Month	Jan	Feb	Mar	Apr	May	Jun	Jul	Aug	Sep	Oct	Nov	Dec	Year
Record high °C (°F)	14.8 (58.6)	18.9 (66.0)	22.0 (71.6)	27.2 (81.0)	33.0 (91.4)	33.9 (93.0)	39.2 (102.6)	34.8 (94.6)	31.1 (88.0)	28.9 (84.0)	17.8 (64.0)	16.0 (60.8)	39.2 (102.6)
Mean daily maximum °C (°F)	7.2 (45.0)	8.0 (46.4)	10.7 (51.3)	13.9 (57.0)	17.1 (62.8)	19.9 (67.8)	22.5 (72.5)	22.3 (72.1)	19.2 (66.6)	14.9 (58.8)	10.4 (50.7)	7.5 (45.5)	14.5 (58.1)
Daily mean °C (°F)	4.2 (39.6)	4.6 (40.3)	6.7 (44.1)	9.2 (48.6)	12.3 (54.1)	15.2 (59.4)	17.5 (63.5)	17.3 (63.1)	14.7 (58.5)	11.1 (52.0)	7.1 (44.8)	4.5 (40.1)	10.4 (50.7)
Mean daily minimum °C (°F)	1.1 (34.0)	1.1 (34.0)	2.6 (36.7)	4.5 (40.1)	7.4 (45.3)	10.4 (50.7)	12.4 (54.3)	12.3 (54.1)	10.1 (50.2)	7.3 (45.1)	3.7 (38.7)	1.4 (34.5)	6.2 (43.2)
Record low °C (°F)	−15.4 (4.3)	−14.5 (5.9)	−8.7 (16.3)	−5.0 (23.0)	−4.0 (24.8)	−0.6 (30.9)	4.0 (39.2)	3.0 (37.4)	−0.9 (30.4)	−5.5 (22.1)	−8.6 (16.5)	−13.4 (7.9)	−15.4 (4.3)
Average precipitation mm (inches)	55.3 (2.18)	43.2 (1.70)	43.5 (1.71)	43.5 (1.71)	48.2 (1.90)	62.4 (2.46)	57.8 (2.28)	62.1 (2.44)	55.4 (2.18)	66.4 (2.61)	63.3 (2.49)	59.3 (2.33)	660.3 (26.00)
Average precipitation days (≥ 1.0 mm)	11.6	10.3	9.4	9.1	8.6	10.0	9.3	9.4	8.9	11.0	12.3	11.7	121.6
Mean monthly sunshine hours	56.9	78.2	112.0	169.1	209.4	194.0	211.3	192.2	145.2	107.6	68.9	51.5	1,596.1
Source 1: Met Office
Source 2: Starlings Roost Weather
