= Hamelin de Warenne, Earl of Surrey =

English nobleman (c. 1130–1202)

Hamelin de Warenne
- Coat of arms of Hamelin de Warenne, Earl of Surrey: France with a bordure of England.

Personal details
- Born: Hamelin de Anjou c. 1130
- Died: 1202
- Resting place: Chapter House of Lewes Priory
- Spouse: Isabel de Warenne, 4th Countess of Surrey
- Children: William de Warenne, 5th Earl of Surrey; Adela de Warenne; Maud de Warenne (alias Matilda); Isabel de Warenne
- Parent: Count Geoffrey V of Anjou
- House: Plantagenet (by birth); Warenne (by marriage)
- Title: Earl of Surrey (jure uxoris)
- Tenure: April 1164 - 1202

Hamelin de Warenne, Earl of Surrey (c. 1130 – 7 May 1202) (alias Hamelin of Anjou and, anachronistically, (Note: "It is much to be wished that the surname "Plantagenet," which since the time of Charles II, has been freely given to all descendants of Geoffrey of Anjou, had some historical basis which would justify its use, for it forms a most convenient method of referring to the Edwardian kings and their numerous descendants. The fact is, however, as has been pointed out by Sir James Ramsay and other writers of our day, that the name, although a personal emblem of the aforesaid Geoffrey, was never borne by any of his descendants before Richard Plantagenet, Duke of York (father of Edward IV), who assumed it, apparently about 1448. V.G., The Complete Peerage, Vol. 1, p. 183 note (c)) Hamelin Plantagenet), was an Anglo-Angevin nobleman, being an elder half-brother of the first Plantagenet English monarch King Henry II.

== Origins ==
Hamelin was an illegitimate son of count Geoffrey of Anjou. He was thus a half-brother of King Henry II of England, and an uncle to both King Richard I and King John.

== Marriage and children ==
King Henry II arranged for him to marry Isabel de Warenne, 4th Countess of Surrey, the widow of William of Blois, one of the wealthiest heiresses in England. The marriage occurred in April 1164, following which he was recognised as Comte de Warenne (that being the customary designation for what more technically should be Earl of Surrey) and adopted the surname de Warenne, as did his descendants. By his wife he had one son and three daughters, as follows:

- William de Warenne, 5th Earl of Surrey, only son and heir, who married Maud Marshal, daughter of William Marshal, 1st Earl of Pembroke
- Adela de Warenne, who married firstly Robert de Newburgh and, secondly William FitzWilliam of Sprotborough. She was a mistress of her half-first cousin (Note: Technically they were half first cousins, both being grandchildren of Geoffrey V, Count of Anjou by different mothers. See Schwenicke, Europaische Stammtaleln (ES), Band II, Tafeln 82, 83; ES, III/3, tafel 355; Sheppard, 'Royal Bye Blows', NEHGR, 119, 97. Her given name is not known for a certainty.) King John, and by him was the mother of Richard FitzRoy, feudal baron of Chilham, in Kent.
- Maud de Warenne (alias Matilda), who married, firstly, Henry II, Count of Eu and Lord of Hastings, secondly, Henry d'Estouteville, Seigneur de Valmont.
- Isabel de Warenne, who married, firstly, Robert de Lacy of Pontefract Castle in Yorkshire, and secondly, Gilbert de l'Aigle, Lord of Pevensey Castle in Sussex.

== Career ==
Warenne was prominent at the royal court of King Henry II, and at those of his sons and successors King Richard I and King John. Warenne's lands in England centered on Conisbrough Castle in Yorkshire, which was a powerful castle he rebuilt. He also possessed the "third penny" (an entitlement to one third of the fines levied in the county courts) of his County of Surrey and held the castles of Mortemer and Bellencombre in Normandy.

In 1164 Hamelin joined in the denunciations of Thomas Becket, Archbishop of Canterbury, although after Becket's murder he became a great believer in Becket's sainthood, having reportedly been cured of blindness by the saint's intervention. In 1176 he escorted his niece Joan to Sicily for her marriage, where she became Queen of Sicily.

He remained loyal to Henry II through all the problems during the later part of his reign when many nobles deserted him, and continued as a close supporter of that king's eldest son and his own nephew, Richard I. During Richard's absence on the Third Crusade, he took the side of the regent William Longchamp. Hamelin was present at the second coronation of King Richard in 1194 and at King John's coronation in 1199.

== Death and succession ==
He died in 1202 and was buried in the chapter house of Lewes Priory in Sussex. He was succeeded by his son William de Warenne, 5th Earl of Surrey.

== Sources ==
- Keats-Rohan, K. S. B. (2002). Domesday Descendants: A Prosopography of Persons Occurring in English Documents, 1066–1166. Vol. 2. The Boydell Press.

== Notes ==
Peerage of England
Preceded by Isabel de Warenne	Earl of Surrey; 1199–1202	Succeeded by William de Warenne
