= Henry Howard, 7th Duke of Norfolk =

English nobleman, politician, and soldier

His Grace The Duke of Norfolk KG PC FRS
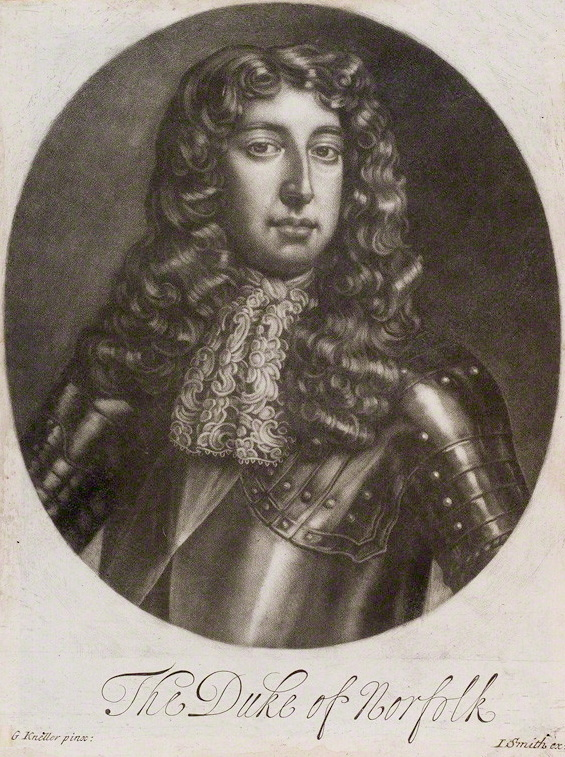

Earl Marshal
- In office 13 January 1684 – 2 April 1701
- Monarchs: Charles II; James II; William III
- Preceded by: The 6th Duke of Norfolk
- Succeeded by: The 8th Duke of Norfolk

Member of the House of Lords Lord Temporal
- In office 13 January 1684 – 2 April 1701; Hereditary Peerage
- Preceded by: The 6th Duke of Norfolk
- Succeeded by: The 8th Duke of Norfolk

Personal details
- Born: 11 January 1655
- Died: 2 April 1701 (aged 46) Norfolk House, London, England
- Resting place: Arundel Castle, Arundel, West Sussex
- Spouse: Mary Mordaunt
- Parents: Henry Howard, 6th Duke of Norfolk (father); Anne Somerset (mother)

Henry Howard, 7th Duke of Norfolk, KG PC FRS (11 January 1655 – 2 April 1701) was an English nobleman, politician, and soldier. He was the son of Henry Howard, 6th Duke of Norfolk, and Lady Anne Somerset, daughter of Edward Somerset, 2nd Marquess of Worcester, and Elizabeth Dormer. He was summoned to the House of Lords in his own right as Baron Mowbray in 1678. His unhappy marriage was the subject of much gossip, and ended in divorce.

== Marriage, separation and divorce ==
He married Mary Mordaunt, the only surviving daughter and heiress of the 2nd Earl of Peterborough and Penelope O'Brien. They separated in 1685. He divorced her for her adultery with Sir John Germain in 1700, after a previous attempt at divorce in 1692 had failed when the House of Lords threw out his private Divorce Bill. Although he succeeded in obtaining damages in an action for criminal conversation, the details were so sordid that he may well have regretted the step, especially since the jury reduced his claim for £100,000 damages to £66, for which they were severely reprimanded by the presiding judge. The Duke was evidently in no position to condemn his wife's moral conduct: even his own counsel called it frankly a case of the pot calling the kettle black.

He died without children, and was succeeded by his nephew, Thomas Howard, 8th Duke of Norfolk. His former wife married secondly Sir John Germain, 1st Baronet, who had been her lover for many years. She died in 1705.

He was rarely on good terms with his father, particularly after 1677 when his father married Jane Bickerton, his mistress of many years standing, an act which caused a violent family quarrel.

== Later life ==
Like almost all the Howards of Norfolk he was a devout Roman Catholic, but during the anti-Catholic hysteria engendered by the Popish Plot he publicly conformed to the Church of England. There is little doubt that this was simply a device to save the family estates. The ploy seems to have succeeded; although his father was charged with recusancy in 1680, the charge was quickly dropped. While the senior Howard line survived unscathed, their cousin William Howard, 1st Viscount Stafford, was executed for his supposed part in the Plot in December 1680. Henry as a peer in his own right, Baron Mowbray, sat as one of the peers who tried him. It is a sign of his moral courage and independent judgment, given the anti-Catholic feeling in the country, that he voted Not Guilty. This was the more notable since according to John Evelyn, of Stafford's extended family in the House of Lords, (eight of them in all), he was the only one to do so, Stafford being a man "not beloved by his family".

He became a Fellow of the Royal Society in 1672. His father was already a fellow and was a generous benefactor of Society.

On 20 June 1685, he was appointed Colonel of the Suffolk Regiment, which at the time was called the Duke of Norfolk's Regiment of Foot. He was created a Knight of the Garter in the same year. As a man "all-powerful in his Dukedom" he used his influence in the 1685 General Election to return members entirely loyal to the Crown (as his father had in 1673 when he found a safe seat at Castle Rising for Samuel Pepys). By 1688, however, he was on bad terms with James II, openly disapproving of the King's aggressive policy of Catholic championship. When asked to question his constituents on whether they favoured repeal of the Test Act, he replied bluntly that he knew that all those in favour of repeal would fit comfortably in one coach. When asked to replace the magistrates in his dukedom with more compliant ones he simply refused and prudently went to France, but returned in time to welcome the Glorious Revolution.

He served as a Privy Councillor under William III and Mary II in 1689. At first, he refused to take the oath necessary to sit in the House of Lords, since although he had publicly conformed to the Anglican rite, it was no secret that he remained a Roman Catholic at heart; but after a few months, he subscribed to the oath. He continued to serve as Lord Lieutenant of Berkshire, Norfolk and Surrey, and ex-officio colonel of the Berkshire Militia under William and Mary.

The first HMS Norfolk was named after him.

His private surgeon was Thomas Greenhill.

== Death ==
A written account of the death of the 7th Duke of Norfolk, who died in London on Wednesday (O.S.) 2 April 1701 by his secretary Francis Negus.

Aprill ye 3rd 1701

Sir,

My Lord Duke died suddendly yesterday about eleven of the clock. His body was opened this night and all parts well, but destroyed with coagulated blood.

Sir, Your afflicted humble servant.

ffr. Negus

For Mr Edward L'Estrange at Mileham Norfolke

— Norfolk lieutenancy journal, 1676-1701, transcribed and edited by Basil Cozens-Hardy, Norfolk Record Society, 1961.

== Family ==
=== Ancestry ===
Ancestors of Henry Howard, 7th Duke of Norfolk

8. Thomas Howard, 21st Earl of Arundel
4. Henry Howard, 22nd Earl of Arundel
9. Alethea Talbot, 13th Baroness Furnivall
2. Henry Howard, 6th Duke of Norfolk
10. Esmé Stuart, 3rd Duke of Lennox
5. Lady Elizabeth Stuart
11. Katherine Clifton, 2nd Baroness Clifton
1. Henry Howard, 7th Duke of Norfolk
12. Henry Somerset, 1st Marquess of Worcester
6. Edward Somerset, 2nd Marquess of Worcester
13. The Hon. Anne Russell
3. Lady Anne Somerset
14. The Hon. William Dormer
7. Elizabeth Dormer
15. Alice Molyneux

=== Family tree ===
Family tree of the Dukes of Norfolk and Suke of Surrey; Earls of Arundel, East Anglia, Norfolk, Norwich, Nottingham, and Surrey; and Barons Mowbray, Segrave and Stourton

Earl of East Anglia (Earls of Norfolk and Suffolk) (1st creation), a. 1069
Ralph the Staller c. 1011–1068; 1st Earl of Norfolk and Suffolk, or of the East Angles (Earl c. 1066/67 – 1068)
Earl of Surrey (1st creation), c. 1088
Ralph de Gael a. 1040–1100; 2nd Earl of Norfolk and Suffolk, or of the East Angles (Earl 1068–1074) | Roger Bigod (Bigot) d. 1107; Sheriff of Norfolk and Suffolk | William de Warenne c. 1035–1088; 1st Earl (of) Warenne / Earl of Surrey, Lord of Lewes, Seigneur de Varennes
Earldom forfeit, 1074
Earl of Norfolk (2nd creation), 1141
King Henry I c. 1068–1135 | Maud Bigod | William Bigod d. 1120 | Hugh Bigod; 1095–1177; 1st Earl of Norfolk (Earl 1141–1177) | William de Warenne d. 1138; 2nd Earl (of) Warenne / Earl of Surrey
Earl of Arundel, Earl of Sussex (1st creations), c. 1138
Empress Matilda c. 1102–1167 | Geoffrey Plantagenet; 1113–1251; Count of Anjou | Adeliza of Louvain c. 1103–1151 | William d'Aubigny c. 1109–1176; 1st Earl of Arundel (Sussex), Earl of Lincoln | William de Warenne; 1119–1148; 3rd Earl of Surrey
King Henry II; 1133–1189 | William d'Aubigny b. c. 1138/1150–1176; 2nd Earl of Arundel (Sussex) | Roger Bigod c. 1144/1150–1221; 2nd Earl of Norfolk (Earl 1189–1221, disputed 1177–1189) | William of Blois c. 1137–1159 | Isabel de Warenne c. 1130 – 1203; 4th Countess of Surrey suo jure | Hamelin de Warenne c. 1130–1202; Comte de Warenne / Earl of Surrey, jure uxoris
King John; 1166/1167–1216 | William d'Aubigny a. 1180–1221; 3rd Earl of Arundel (Sussex) | Hugh Bigod; 1186–1225; 3rd Earl of Norfolk (Earl 1221–1225) | Maud Marshal; 1192–1248 | William de Warenne c. 1160s/1170s–1240 5th Earl of Surrey
William d'Aubigny c. 1203–a. 1124; 4th Earl of Arundel (Sussex) | Hugh d'Aubigny d. 1243; 5th Earl of Arundel (Sussex) | Isabel d'Aubigny | John Fitzalan; 1200–1240; Lord of Clun and Oswestry | Roger Bigod c. 1209–1270; 4th Earl of Norfolk (Earl 1233–1270) | Hugh Bigod c. 1211–1266
Earl of Sussex (1st creation), 1282
King Henry III; 1207–1272 | John Fitzalan; 1223–1267; 6th Earl of Arundel (Sussex), jure matris | John de Warenne; 1231–1304; 1st Earl of Sussex (Earl of Sussex 1282–1304), 6th Earl of Surrey (Earl of Surrey 1240–1304)
Baron Segrave of Se(a)grave, 1283
Nicholas Segrave c. 1238–a. 1295; 1st Baron Segrave | King Edward I 1239–1307 | Edmund Crouchback; 1245–1296; Earl of Lancaster | John Fitzalan; 1246–1272; 7th Earl of Arundel (Sussex), jure matris | Roger Bigod c. 1245–1306; 5th Earl of Norfolk (Earl 1270–1306)
Earldom extinct, 1270
Baron Mowbray, 1283 | Earl of Arundel (2nd (1st by writ) creation), 1289
John Segrave c. 1256–1325; 2nd Baron Segrave | Roger de Mowbray; 1254–1297; 1st Baron Mowbray | Richard Fitzalan; 1267–1302; 1st (or 6th) Earl of Arundel | William de Warenne; 1256–1286
Earl of Norfolk (3rd creation), 1312
Stephen Segrave d. 1325; 3rd Baron Segrave | Thomas of Brotherton; 1300–1338; 1st Earl of Norfolk (Earl 1312–1338) | John Mowbray; 1286–1322; 2nd Baron Mowbray | Henry c. 1281–1345; Earl of Leicester, Earl of Lancaster | Edmund Fitzalan; 1286–1326; 2nd (or 7th) Earl of Arundel | Alice de Warenne; 1287–1388 heir apparent to the Earldom of Surrey | John de Warenne; 1286–1347; 7th Earl of Surrey, 2nd Earl of Sussex
Earldom of Arundel (2nd creation) forfeit, 1326 | Earldom of Sussex extinct(?), 1347
Earldom of Arundel (2nd creation) restored, 1331
John Segrave; 1315–1353; 4th Baron Segrave | Margaret of Brotherton; 1320–1399; Duchess of Norfolk "for life" (Duchess 1397–1399), 2nd Countess of Norfolk (Countess 1338–1399), | John Mowbray; 1310–1361; 3rd Baron Mowbray | Joan of Lancaster c. 1312–1349 | Eleanor of Lancaster; 1318–1372 | Richard FitzAlan c. 1313–1376; 3rd (or 8th) Earl of Arundel (Earl of Arundel 1331–1376), 8th Earl of Surrey (Earl of Surrey 1347–1376)
Baron Arundel, 1377
Elizabeth de Segrave; 1338–1368; 5th Baroness Segrave | John de Mowbray; 1340–1368; 4th Baron Mowbray | Richard FitzAlan; 1346–1397; 4th (or 9th) Earl of Arundel, 9th Earl of Surrey | John FitzAlan c. 1348–1379; 1st Baron Arundel | Alice FitzAlan
Earldom of Arundel (2nd creation) forfeit, 1397
Earl of Nottingham (1st creation), 1377 | Earl of Nottingham (2nd creation), 1383; Duke of Norfolk (1st creation), 1397 | Duke of Surrey, 1397
John de Mowbray; 1365–1383; Earl of Nottingham (Earl 1377–1383), 6th Baron Segrave, 5th Baron Mowbray (Baron 1368–1383) | Thomas de Mowbray; 1366–1399; 1st Duke of Norfolk, etc. (Duke 1397–1399), 3rd Earl of Norfolk (Earl 1399), 7th Baron Segrave, 6th Baron Mowbray (Baron 1377–1399) | Elizabeth Fitzalan; 1366–1425 | John FitzAlan; 1364–1390; 2nd Baron Arundel | Thomas Holland; 1372–1400; Duke of Surrey, Earl of Kent, Baron Holland
Earldom of Nottingham extinct, 1383 | Titles forfeit, 1399 | Dukedom of Surrey renounced, 1400
Baron Stourton, 1448 | Duke of Norfolk (1st creation restored), 1425 | Earldom of Arundel (2nd creation) restored, 1400
John Stourton; 1400–1462; 1st Baron Stourton (Baron 1448–1462) | Thomas de Mowbray; 1385–1405; 4th Earl of Norfolk, 8th Baron Segrave, 7th Baron Mowbray (Earl 1399–1405) | John de Mowbray; 1392–1432; 2nd Duke of Norfolk (Duke 1425–1432), 5th Earl of Norfolk, 9th Baron Segrave, 8th Baron Mowbray (Earl 1405–1432) | Margaret de Mowbray c. 1388–1459 | Robert Howard; 1385–1436 | Isabel de Mowbray c. 1400–1452 | Thomas FitzAlan; 1381–1415; 5th (or 10th) Earl of Arundel, 10th Earl of Surrey | John Fitzalan; 1385–1421; 6th (or 11th) Earl of Arundel, 3rd Baron Arundel, 3rd Baron Maltravers
Duke of Norfolk (4th creation), 1483
William Stourton a. 1426–1478; 2nd Baron Stourton (Baron 1462–1478) | John de Mowbray; 1415–1461; 3rd Duke of Norfolk, 6th Earl of Norfolk, 10th Baron Segrave, 9th Baron Mowbray (Duke 1432–1461) | John Howard; 1425–1485; 1st Duke of Norfolk, 13th Baron Segrave, 12th Baron Mowbray (Duke 1483–1485) | John Fitzalan; 1408–1435; 7th (or 12th) Earl of Arundel, 4th Baron Arundel, 4th Baron Maltravers | William Fitzalan; 1417–1487; 9th (or 14th) Earl of Arundel, 6th Baron Arundel, 6th Baron Maltravers
Titles forfeit, 1485
Earl of Surrey (2nd creation), 1451 | Duke of Norfolk (4th creation) restored and Earl of Surrey, 1514
John Stourton c. 1454–1485; 3rd Baron Stourton (Baron 1479–1485) | William Stourton c. 1457–1524; 5th Baron Stourton (Baron 1487–1524) | John de Mowbray; 1444–1476; 4th Duke of Norfolk, 7th Earl of Norfolk, 11th Baron Segrave, 10th Baron Mowbray (Duke 1461–1476), Earl of Surrey (Earl 1451–1476) | King Edward IV; 1442–1483 | Thomas Howard; 1443–1524; 2nd Duke of Norfolk, 1st Earl of Surrey (Duke 1514–1524) | Humfrey Fitzalan; 1429–1438; 8th (or 13th) Earl of Arundel, 5th Baron Arundel, 5th Baron Maltravers | Thomas Fitzalan; 1450–1524; 10th (or 15th) Earl of Arundel, 7th Baron Arundel, 7th Baron Maltravers
Dukedom of Norfolk, Earldom of Nottingham, Earldom of Surrey extinct, 1476
Duke of Norfolk (3rd creation), Earl of Nottingham (3rd creation), and Earl of Surrey, 1477
Francis Stourton; 1485–1487; 4th Baron Stourton (Baron 1485–1487) | Edward Stourton; 1463–1535; 6th Baron Stourton (Baron 1524–1535) | Anne de Mowbray; 1472–1481; 8th Countess of Norfolk, 12th Baroness Segrave, 11th Baroness Mowbray (Countess 1476–1481) | Richard of Shrewsbury; 1473–1483; Duke of York, Duke of Norfolk, Earl of Nottingham, Earl of Warenne (Duke 1477–1483) | Anne of York; 1475–1511 | Thomas Howard; 1473–1554; 3rd Duke of Norfolk, 2nd Earl of Surrey (Duke 1524–1554) | Edmund Howard c. 1478–1539 | Elizabeth Boleyn c. 1480–1538 | William Fitzalan; 1476–1544; 11th (or 16th) Earl of Arundel, 8th Baron Arundel, 8th Baron Maltravers
Earldom of Norfolk extinct and Baronies Segrave and Mowbray in abeyance, 1481 | Dukedom of Norfolk, Earldom of Nottingham, Earldom of Surrey extinct, 1483 | Attainted, 1547; Restored, 1553
William Stourton c. 1505–1548; 7th Baron Stourton | Earl of Nottingham (5th creation), 1525 | King Henry VIII; 1491–1547 | Anne Boleyn c. 1501 or 1507–1536
Viscount Howard of Bindon, 1559
Charles Stourton c. 1520–1557; 8th Baron Stourton | Henry Howard; 1517–1547 styled Earl of Surrey | Thomas Howard c. 1520–1582; 1st Viscount Howard of Bindon | Mary FitzRoy; 1519–1557 | Henry FitzRoy; 1519–1536; Duke of Richmond and Somerset, Earl of Nottingham | Catherine Howard c. 1524–1542 | Henry Fitzalan; 1512–1580; 12th (or 17th) Earl of Arundel, 9th Baron Arundel, 9th Baron Maltravers
Earldom of Nottingham extinct, 1536
Thomas Howard; 1536–1572; 4th Duke of Norfolk, 3rd Earl of Surrey, 13th Baron Mowbray (Duke 1554–1572) | Henry Howard; 1540–1614; Earl of Northampton | Queen Elizabeth I 1533–1603 | Mary FitzAlan; 1540–1557
Dukedom (3rd creation) forfeit, 1572
Earl of Arundel (3rd creation), 1580 | Earl of Suffolk (4th creation), 1603
John Stourton; 1553–1588; 9th Baron Stourton | Edward Stourton c. 1555–1633; 10th Baron Stourton | Philip Howard; 1557–1595; 20th/13th/1st Earl of Arundel, styled Earl of Surrey | Thomas Howard; 1561–1626; Earl of Suffolk | Lord William Howard; 1563–1640
Earldom of Arundel and Barony of Mowbray attainted, 1589 | see Earls, Marquesses, and Dukes of Suffolk family tree
Earl of Arundel (3rd creation) and Barony of Mowbray restored, 1604; Earl of Norfolk (5th creation), 1644
William Stourton c. 1594–1672; 11th Baron Stourton | Thomas Howard; 1585–1646; 21st/14th/2nd Earl of Arundel, 2nd/4th Earl of Surrey, 1st Earl of Norfolk, 14th Baron Mowbray (Earl 1644–1646) | Philip
see Earls of Shrewsbury family tree
Edward Stourton; 1617–1644 | Alethea Talbot; 1585–1654; 17th Baroness Strange of Blackmere, 14th Baroness Talbot, 13th Baroness Furnivall | Henry Frederick Howard; 1608–1652; 22nd/15th/3rd Earl of Arundel, 3rd/5th Earl of Surrey, 2nd Earl of Norfolk, 15th Baron Mowbray (Earl 1646–1652) | William Howard; 1614–1680; Viscount Stafford | William
Duke of Norfolk (4th creation restored), 1660 | Baron Howard of Castle Rising, 1669; Earl of Norwich (3rd creation), 1672
William Stourton d. 1685; 12th Baron Stourton | Thomas Howard; 1627–1677; 5th Duke of Norfolk, 21st/14th/2nd Earl of Arundel, 4th/6th Earl of Surrey, 16th Baron Mowbray (Duke 1660–1677) 18th Baron Strange of Blackmere, 15th Baron Talbot, 14th Baron Furnivall (Baron 1654–1677) | Henry Howard; 1628–1684; 6th Duke of Norfolk, 22nd/15th/3rd Earl of Arundel, 5th/7th Earl of Surrey; 18th Baron Strange of Blackmere, 17th Baron Mowbray, 15th Baron Talbot, 14th Baron Furnivall (Duke 1677–1684) 1st Earl of Norwich, etc. (Earl 1672–1684) | Charles Howard; 1630–1713 | Col. Bernard Howard; 1641–1717 | Charles Howard; 1628–1685; Earl of Carlisle
Edward Stourton; 1665–1720; 13th Baron Stourton | Thomas Stourton; 1667–1744; 14th Baron Stourton | Charles Stourton; 1669–1739 | Henry Howard; 1655–1701; 7th Duke of Norfolk, 22nd/15th/3rd Earl of Arundel, 5th/7th Earl of Surrey, 2nd Earl of Norwich, etc. 18th Baron Mowbray, 19th Baron Strange of Blackmere, 15th Baron Talbot, 14th Baron Furnivall (Duke 1684–1701) | Lord Thomas Howard; 1662–1689 | Henry Charles Howard d. 1720
Thomas Howard; 1683–1732; 8th Duke of Norfolk, 23rd/16th/4th Earl of Arundel, 6th/8th Earl of Surrey, 3rd Earl of Norwich, etc. 18th Baron Strange of Blackmere, 15th Baron Talbot, 14th Baron Furnivall, 19th Baron Mowbray (Duke 1701–1732) | Edward Howard; 1685–1777; 9th Duke of Norfolk, 24th/17th/5th Earl of Arundel, 7th/9th Earl of Surrey, 4th Earl of Norwich, etc. 20th Baron Mowbray, 20th Baron Strange of Blackmere, 15th Baron Talbot, 14th Baron Furnivall (Duke 1732–1777) | Philip Howard; 1688–1750 | Bernard Howard; 1674–1735
Earldom of Norwich (3rd creation) and Barony of Howard of Castle Rising extinct and Baronies of Furnivall, Mowbray, Segrave, Strange of Blackmere, and Talbot abeyant, 1777
Charles Stourton; 1702–1753; 15th Baron Stourton | William Stourton; 1704–1781; 16th Baron Stourton | Winifred Howard; 1726–1753 | Anne Howard; 1742–1787 | Charles Howard; 1720–1786; 10th Duke of Norfolk, 25th/18th/6th Earl of Arundel, 8th/10th Earl of Surrey (Duke 1777–1786) | Henry Howard; 1713–1787
Charles Philip Stourton; 1752–1816; 17th Baron Stourton | Charles Howard; 1746–1815; 11th Duke of Norfolk, 26th/19th/7th Earl of Arundel, 9th/11th Earl of Surrey (Duke 1786–1815)
William Stourton; 1776–1846; 18th Baron Stourton | Bernard Howard; 1765–1842; 12th Duke of Norfolk, 27th/20th/8th Earl of Arundel, 10th/12th Earl of Surrey (Duke 1815–1842) | Henry Howard-Molyneux-Howard; 1766–1824
Charles Stourton; 1802–1872; 19th Baron Stourton | Henry Howard; 1791–1856; 13th Duke of Norfolk, 28th/21st/9th Earl of Arundel, 11th/13th Earl of Surrey (Duke 1842–1856) | Henry Howard-Molyneux-Howard; 1802–1875
Baron Mowbray and Baron Segrave abeayance restored, 1878 | Baron Howard of Glossop, 1869
Alfred Joseph Stourton; 1829–1893; 24th Baron Segrave, 21st/23rd Baron Mowbray, 20th Baron Stourton | Henry Granville Fitzalan-Howard; 1815–1860; 14th Duke of Norfolk, 29th/22nd/10th Earl of Arundel, 12th/14th Earl of Surrey (Duke 1856–1860) | Edward George Fitzalan-Howard; 1818–1883; 1st Baron Howard of Glossop
Baron Howard of Penrith, 1830
Charles Botolph Joseph Stourton; 1867–1936; 25th Baron Segrave, 22nd/24th Baron Mowbray, 21st Baron Stourton | Henry Fitzalan-Howard; 1847–1917; 15th Duke of Norfolk, 30th/23rd/11th Earl of Arundel, 13th/15th Earl of Surrey, Lord Maltravers, Earl of Arundel and Surrey (Duke 1860–1917) | Francis Fitzalan-Howard; 1859–1924; 2nd Baron Howard of Glossop | Esmé Howard; 1863–1939; 1st Baron Howard of Penrith
William Marmaduke Stourton; 1895–1965; 26th Baron Segrave, 23rd/25th Baron Mowbray, 22nd Baron Stourton | Bernard Fitzalan-Howard; 1908–1975; 16th Duke of Norfolk, 31st/24th/12th Earl of Arundel, 14th/16th Earl of Surrey (Duke 1917–1975) | Bernard Edward Fitzalan-Howard; 1885–1972; 3rd Baron Howard of Glossop | Francis Howard; 1905–1999; 2nd Baron Howard of Penrith
Charles Edward Stourton; 1923–2006; 27th Baron Segrave, 24th/26th Baron Mowbray, 23rd Baron Stourton | Miles Fitzalan-Howard; 1915–2002; 17th Duke of Norfolk, 32nd/25th/13th Earl of Arundel, 15th/17th Earl of Surrey, 4th Baron Howard of Glossop (Duke 1975–2002) m. Mary Teresa Constable-Maxwell
Edward William Stephen Stourton; 1953–2021; 28th Baron Segrave, 25th/27th Baron Mowbray, 24th Baron Stourton | Marsha Howard b. 1953 | Edward Fitzalan-Howard b. 1956; 18th Duke of Norfolk, 33rd/26th/14th Earl of Arundel, 16th/18th Earl of Surrey, 5th Baron Howard of Glossop (from 2002) m. Georgina Susan Gore | Philip Esmé Howard b. 1945; 3rd Baron Howard of Penrith
Sarah Louise Stourton b. 1982 | Isabella Laura Stourton b. 1983 | Camilla Charlotte Stourton b. 1987 | Francesca Jane Stourton b. 1988 | James Charles Peter Stourton b. 1991; 29th Baron Segrave, 26th/28th Baron Mowbray, 25th Baron Stourton | Henry Fitzalan-Howard b. 1987 styled Earl of Arundel and Surrey | Thomas Philip Howard b. 1974
Co-heir presumptive to the Baronies Segrave, Mowbray, and Stourton | Co-heir presumptive to the Baronies Segrave, Mowbray, and Stourton | Co-heir presumptive to the Baronies Segrave, Mowbray, and Stourton | Co-heir presumptive to the Baronies Segrave, Mowbray, and Stourton | Heir apparent to the dukedom | Heir apparent to the Barony Howard of Penrith

== See also ==
- "Howard, Henry (1655-1701)" . Dictionary of National Biography. London: Smith, Elder & Co. 1885–1900.

Political offices
| Preceded by The Duke of Norfolk | Earl Marshal; 1684–1701 | Succeeded by The Duke of Norfolk |
Military offices
| New regiment | Colonel of The Duke of Norfolk's Regiment of Foot; 1685–1686 | Succeeded by The Earl of Lichfield |
| New regiment | Colonel of The Duke of Norfolk's Regiment of Foot; 1688–1689 | Succeeded by Sir Henry Bellasis |
Honorary titles
| Preceded by The Duke of Cumberland | Lord Lieutenant of Surrey; 1682–1701 | Succeeded by The Earl of Berkeley |
| Preceded by The Duke of Cumberland | Constable of Windsor Castle; 1682–1701 | Succeeded by The Duke of Northumberland |
| Preceded by The Duke of Cumberland | Lord Lieutenant of Berkshire; 1682–1701 | Succeeded by The Earl of Abingdon |
| Preceded by The Earl Craven | Custos Rotulorum of Berkshire; 1689–1701 | Succeeded by The Earl of Abingdon |
| Preceded by The Earl of Yarmouth | Lord Lieutenant of Norfolk; 1683–1701 | Succeeded by The Viscount Townshend |
| Preceded by The Lord Cramond | Custos Rotulorum of Norfolk; 1689–1701 | Succeeded by The Viscount Townshend |
| Preceded by The Earl of Berkeley | Custos Rotulorum of Surrey; 1689 | Succeeded by The Earl of Berkeley |
Peerage of England
| Preceded by Henry Howard | Duke of Norfolk; 1684–1701 | Succeeded by Thomas Howard |
| Preceded by Henry Howard | Baron Mowbray (writ of acceleration); 1677–1701 | Succeeded by Thomas Howard |
