= Minuscule 476 =

- New Testament manuscript
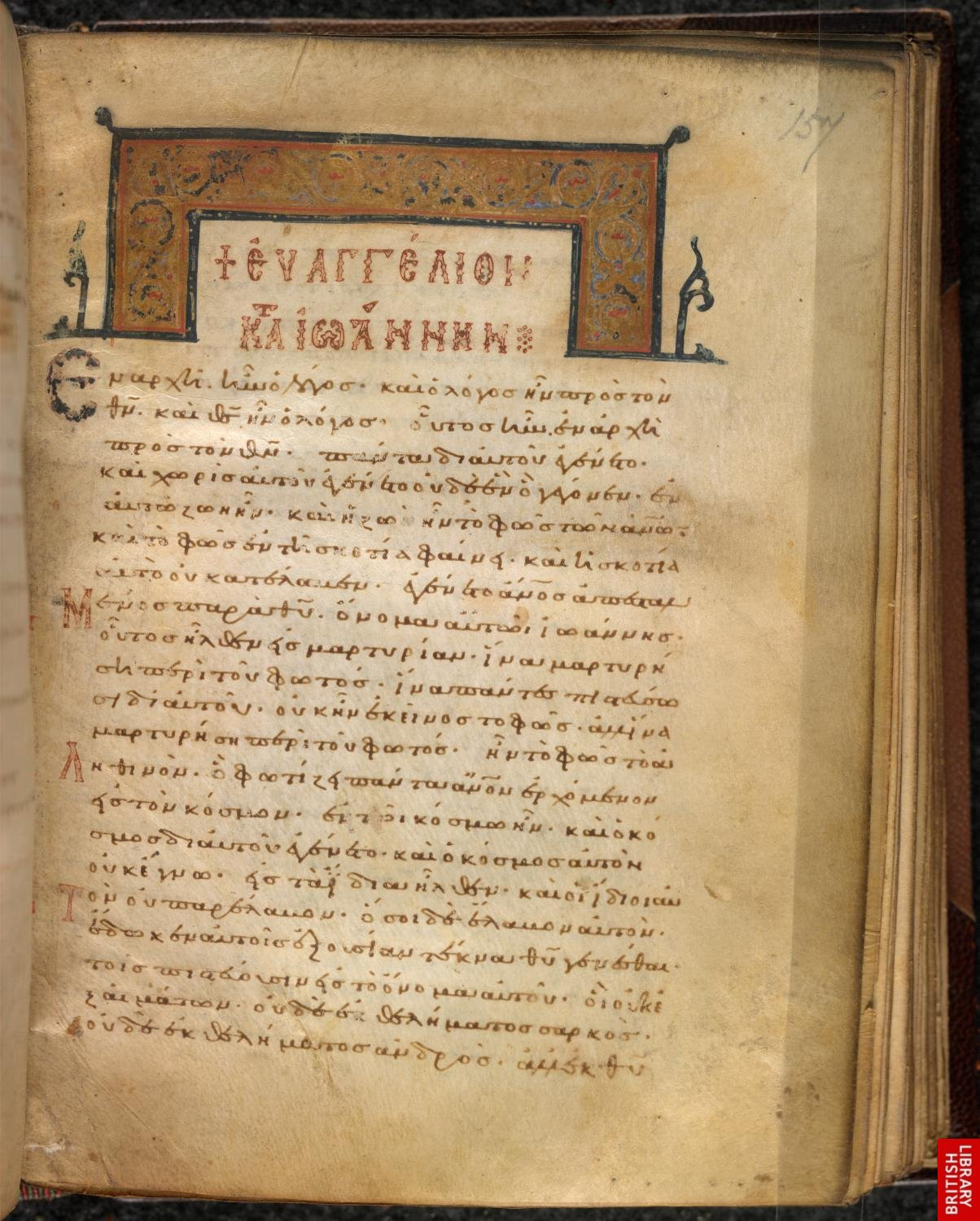
- The first page of John
- Text: Gospels
- Date: 11th century
- Script: Greek
- Now at: British Library
- Size: 17.5 cm by 13.5 cm
- Type: Byzantine text-type
- Category: V
- Note: full marginalia

Minuscule 476 (in the Gregory-Aland numbering), ε 1126 (in the Soden numbering), is a Greek minuscule manuscript of the New Testament, on parchment. Palaeographically it has been assigned to the 11th century. The manuscript was adapted for liturgical use. It has liturgical books and full marginalia. Scrivener labelled it by number 566. The codex is in the British Library as Arundel MS 524.

== Description ==
The codex contains the text of the four Gospels on 218 parchment leaves (size 17.5 cm by 13.5 cm), with only one lacunae (John 11:18-41). The text is written in one column per page, 27 lines per page.

The text is divided according to the κεφαλαια (chapters), whose numbers are given at the margin, and the τιτλοι (titles of chapters) at the top of the pages. There is also a division according to the Ammonian Sections (in Mark 236 sections, the last section in 16:15), with references to the Eusebian Canons.

It contains Epistula ad Carpianum, Eusebian Canon tables, tables of the κεφαλαια (tables of contents) before each Gospel, lectionary markings at the margin (for liturgical use), liturgical books with hagiographies (Synaxarion and Menologion), and pictures.

== Text ==
The Greek text of the codex is a representative of the Byzantine text-type. Aland placed it in Category V. It belongs to the textual family K^{1}.

== History ==
Scrivener and Gregory dated it to the 11th century. It is dated by the INTF to the 11th century.

The manuscript was brought from the East to England by Thomas Earl of Arundel in 1646. Henry Howard, Evelyn's Duke of Norfolk, presented it to the Royal Society in 1667 (along with ℓ 183 and ℓ 187). It was transferred in 1831 to the British Museum.

The manuscript was examined and collated by Scrivener, who published its text in 1852. The manuscript was added to the list of New Testament manuscripts by Scrivener (566) and Gregory (476).

It is currently housed at the British Library (Arundel MS 524) in London.

== See also ==
- List of New Testament minuscules
- Biblical manuscript
- Textual criticism
