= Lectionary 187 =

Lectionary ℓ 187
- New Testament manuscript
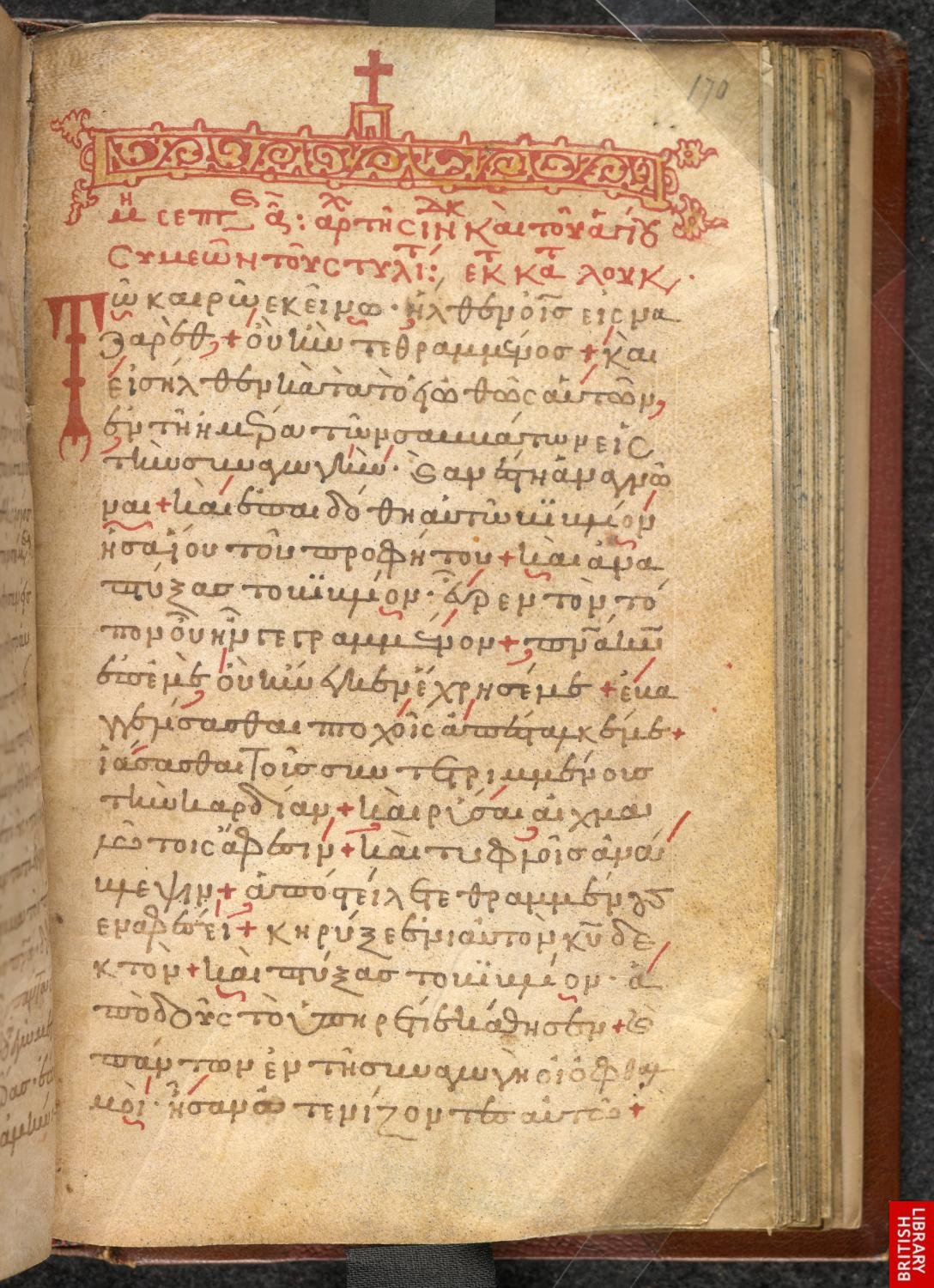
- Folio 170, the decorated head-piece at the top
- Name: Arundel 536
- Text: Evangelistarion †
- Date: 13th century
- Script: Greek
- Now at: British Library
- Size: 23.7 cm by 15.2 cm

Lectionary 187 or Arundel 536 is a Greek New Testament manuscript written on parchment. It is designated by siglum ℓ187 in the Gregory-Aland numbering of New Testament manuscripts. Biblical scholar Frederick H. A. Scrivener labelled it by 256^{e}. Using the study of comparative writing styles (palaeography), it has been assigned to the 13th century. The manuscript has several gaps. It forms part of the British Library Arundel Manuscripts collection.

== Description ==
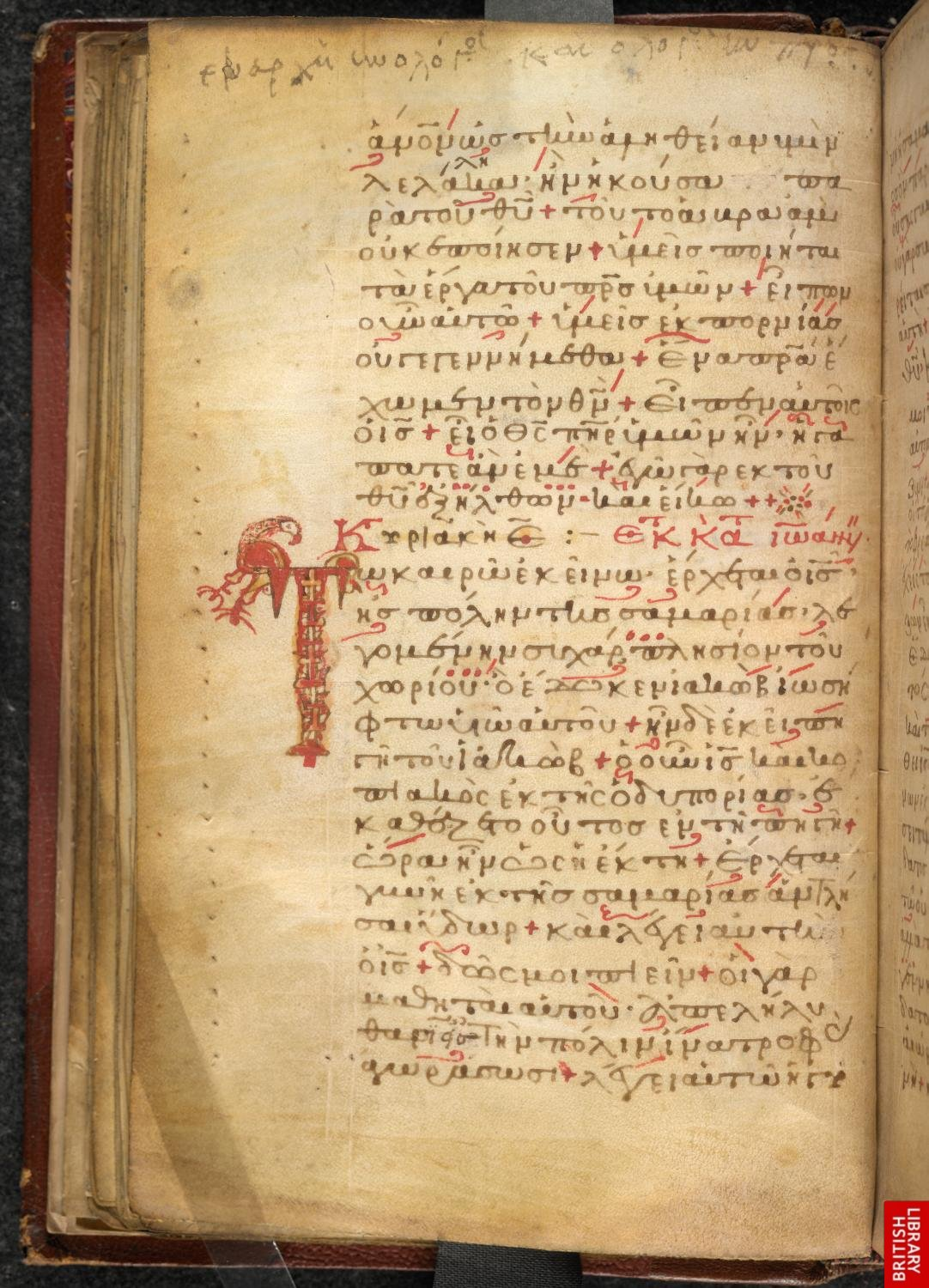
Folio 24 verso, zoomorphic initial

The manuscript is a codex (precursor to the modern book), containing lessons (known as lectons) from the Gospels of John, Matthew, Luke (known as a Evangelistarium) and the Epistles. It is written in Greek minuscule letters, on 217 parchment leaves (sized 23.7 cm by 15.2 cm). The manuscript has three leaves missing from the beginning which were supplemented by a later hand on paper, probably in the 15th century. They are single modern paper flyleaves, numbered as leaves I-III. The leaves 172-173 were supplemented by a later hand on parchment.

The writing is in black ink, one column per page, with 23-27 lines per page. It contains musical notes in red ink, and decorated head-pieces also in red ink. The initial letters are written in the margin in large letters, using either red and yellow ink, or red, black, and yellow ink. The codex contains decorations of either zoomorphic (birds, fishes, snake) or anthropomorphic (hands) types. The lessons of the codex were read during the weekdays from Easter to Pentecost, as well as on Saturdays.

== History ==
The earliest history of the manuscript is unknown. The codex was likely written in the eastern Mediterranean. It was presented by Henry Howard, 6th Duke of Norfolk, to the Royal Society in London in 1667. In 1831, it was bought from the Royal Society in London along with 549 Arundel manuscripts, and transferred to the British Museum. It was rebound in 1897.

The manuscript was examined by textual critic Samuel Thomas Bloomfield. Biblical scholar Caspar René Gregory saw the manuscript in 1883. It was added to the list of New Testament manuscripts by Scrivener (as 256), and Gregory later included it in his list as ℓ187. The textual variants in the codex have some sporadic citations in critical editions of the Greek New Testament. It is usually dated to the 13th century, and sometimes to the 12th century. The codex is currently located in the British Library (shelf number MS Arundel 536) in London, England.

== See also ==
- List of New Testament lectionaries
- Biblical manuscript
- Textual criticism
- Lectionary 188

== Bibliography ==
- Edward Bernard, Catalogi librorum manuscriptorum Angliae et Hiberniae, 3 vols (Oxford: Sheldonian, 1697), III, no. 3442.
- Catalogue of Manuscripts in The British Museum, New Series, 1 vol. in 2 parts (London: The British Museum, 1834–1840), I, part I: The Arundel Manuscripts, pp. 163–64.
- Summary Catalogue of Greek Manuscripts (London: British Library, 1999- ), I, 18–19.
