= Howard Psalter and Hours =

Fourteenth-century illuminated manuscript

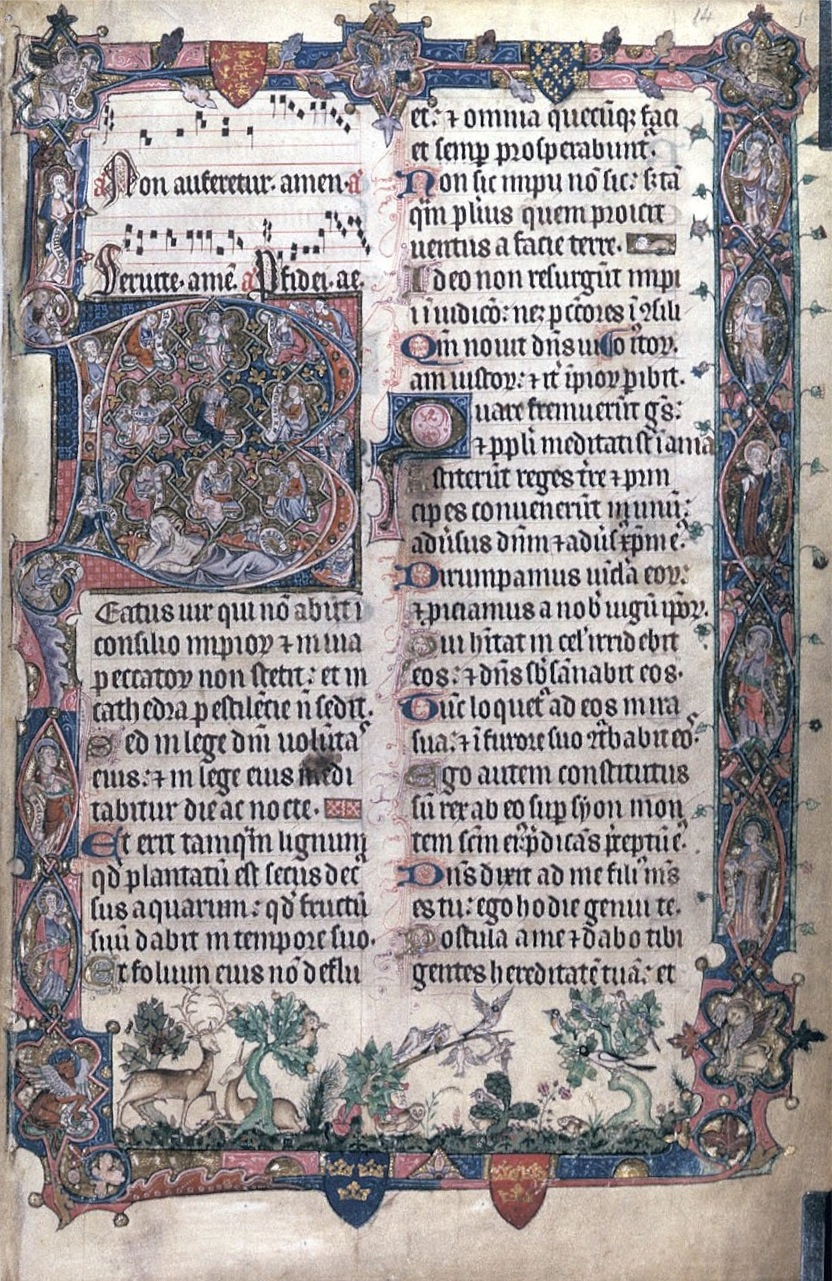
Folio 14r, initial B from "Beatus", first word of Psalm 1

The Howard Psalter and Hours (British Library Arundel MS 83 I) is a 14th-century illuminated prayerbook. It includes a liturgical Psalter with canticles and litany, the Office of the Dead, a calendar of East Anglian origin and an incomplete Hours of the Passion. It was produced between 1310 and 1320. It is written in Latin in a Gothic script in two columns per page. There are 115 extant folios which measure 360 by 235 mm. The text block occupies an area of 250 by 166 mm. It is bound together with the De Lisle Psalter, a contemporary psalter.

== Decoration ==
The manuscript is lavishly decorated. There are nine diagrams, six miniatures, eight large historiated initials, two smaller historiated initials and three decorated initials, all of which are painted in colors and feature gold leaf. The larger historiated initials have full borders which are historiated and contain scenes in the base of the page. The smaller historiated initials have partial foliate borders. The decorated initials have extensions into the margins of the page. There are also some smaller decorated initials which include human heads, which are also painted in colors and gold. There are also smaller gold initials on red and blue grounds, smaller gold initials with purple foliate pen flourishes and smaller blue initials with red foliate pen flourishes.

== Provenance ==
The manuscript may have been made for John Litton (d.1326), whose arms appear on folios 47r and 55v. It was also owned by Theodore of Malinton, Baron of Wemme (d. 1408). An inscription on folio 117r notes his death on May 7, 1408. The manuscript was owned by the antiquary Lord William Howard (d. 1640), the younger son of Thomas Howard (d. 1572), 4th duke of Norfolk. William Howard probably first bound it with the De Lisle Psalter. The manuscript was bequeathed to his William Howard's nephew Thomas Howard (d. 1646), 2nd Earl of Arundel, 4th Earl of Surrey, and 1st Earl of Norfolk, and then inherited by Henry Howard, 6th Duke of Norfolk (d. 1684), who presented the volume, along with the other manuscripts in the Earl of Arundel's collection to the Royal Society in 1667. In 1883 the British Museum Library purchased the Arundel manuscripts from the Royal Society, passing it to the newly formed British Library in 1973.

== De Lisle Psalter ==
Bound with the Howard Psalter is part of what was once the De Lisle Psalter (Arundel MS 83 II), (Note: MS 83 I consists of folios 1r-116v; MS 83 II, 117r-135v) consisting of a calendar and the Speculum theologiae, a collection of diagrams attributed to John of Metz, a 13th-century Franciscan friar working in Paris. The illuminations have been attributed to the Madonna Master, named after the facing miniatures of the Virgin and the Crucifixion (ff. 131v-132r), (Note: Except the miniature on f. 123v and three diagrams (ff. 128v, 129r, 135r)) who may also have been responsible for paintings on the oak sedilia at Westminster Abbey (1307–8). (Note: see Hourihane, vol.3, p.118)

== Gallery ==
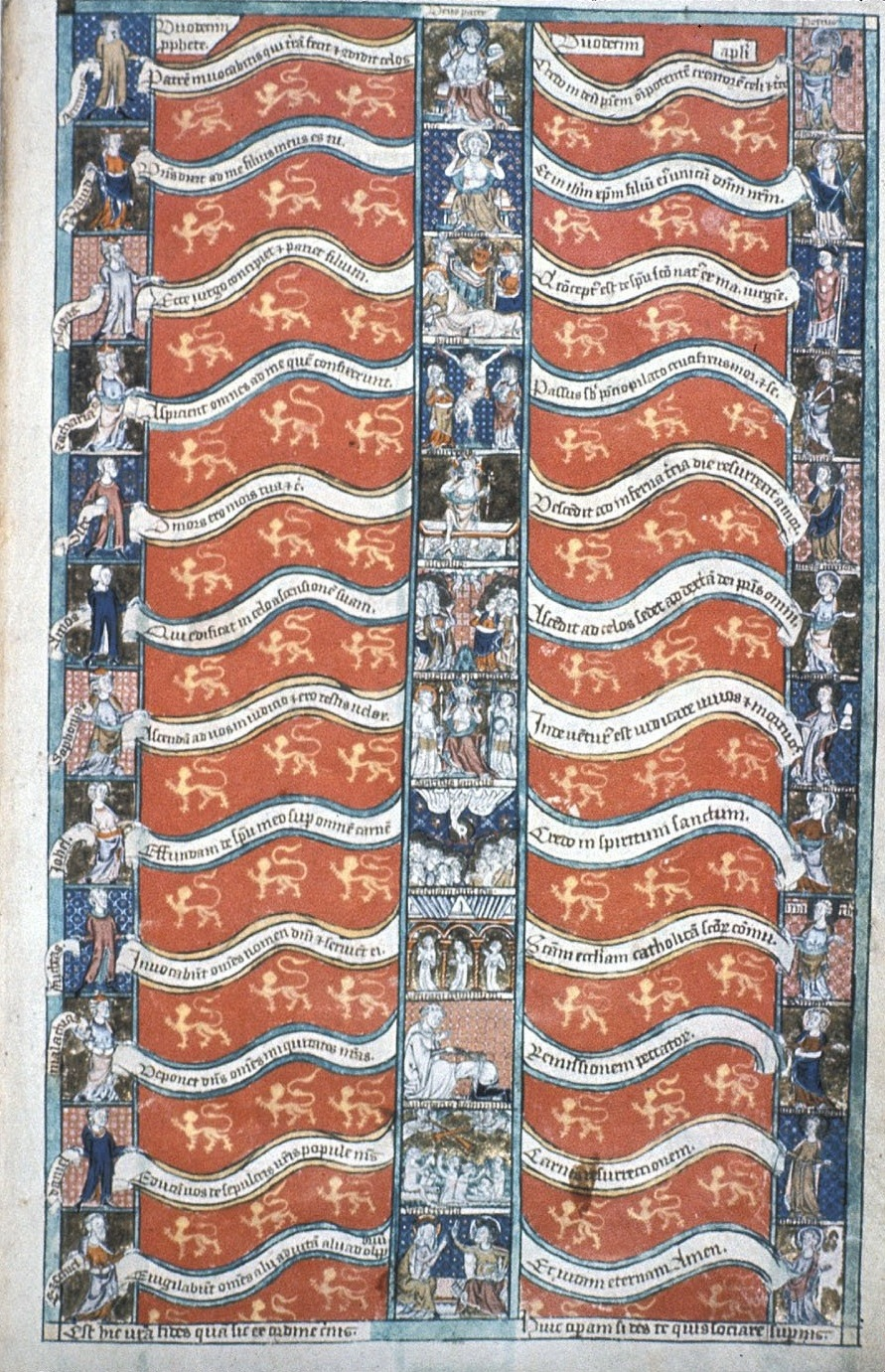
The Twelve Articles of Faith (folio 12v)

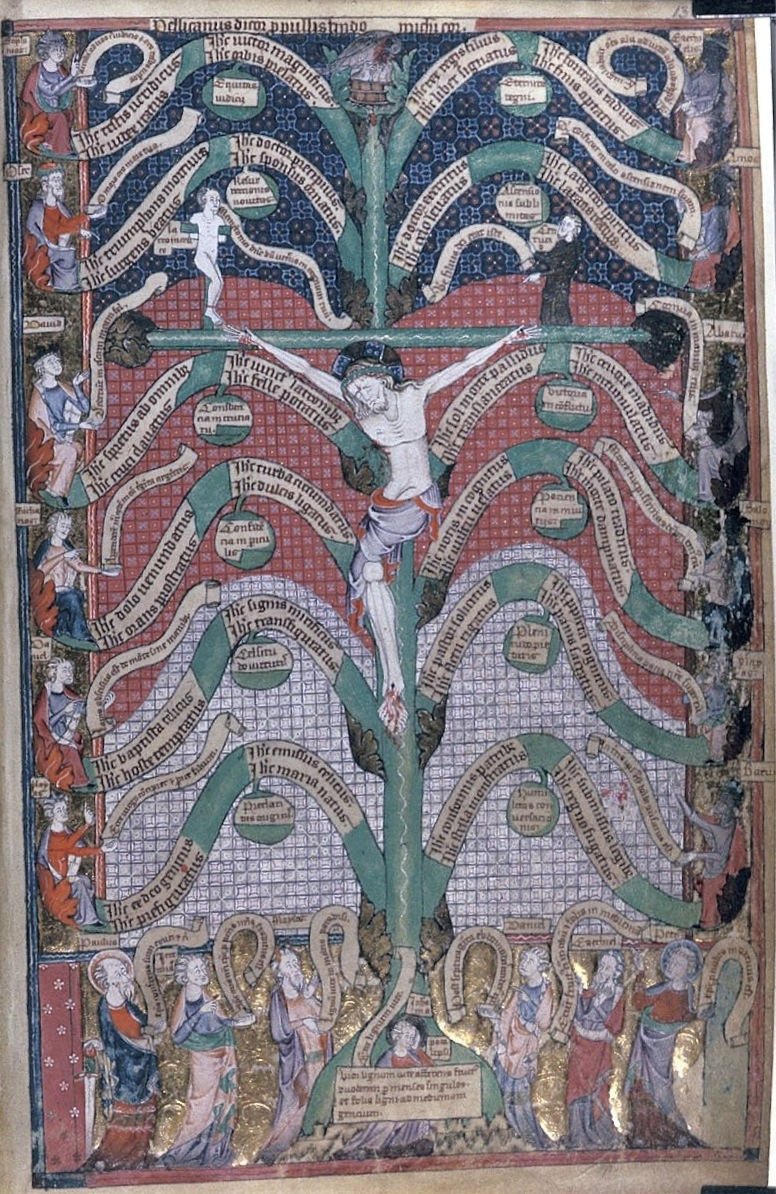
Crucifixion / Tree of life scene with saints bordering (folio 13r)
Based upon Bonaventure's Lignum Vitae

Wheel of the Twelve Attributes of Human Existence. Christ's head is surrounded by twenty-five radial segments with readings about the twelve ages of man, and symbols of the four evangelists in each corner.
Madonna Master from the De Lisle Psalter (folio 126).

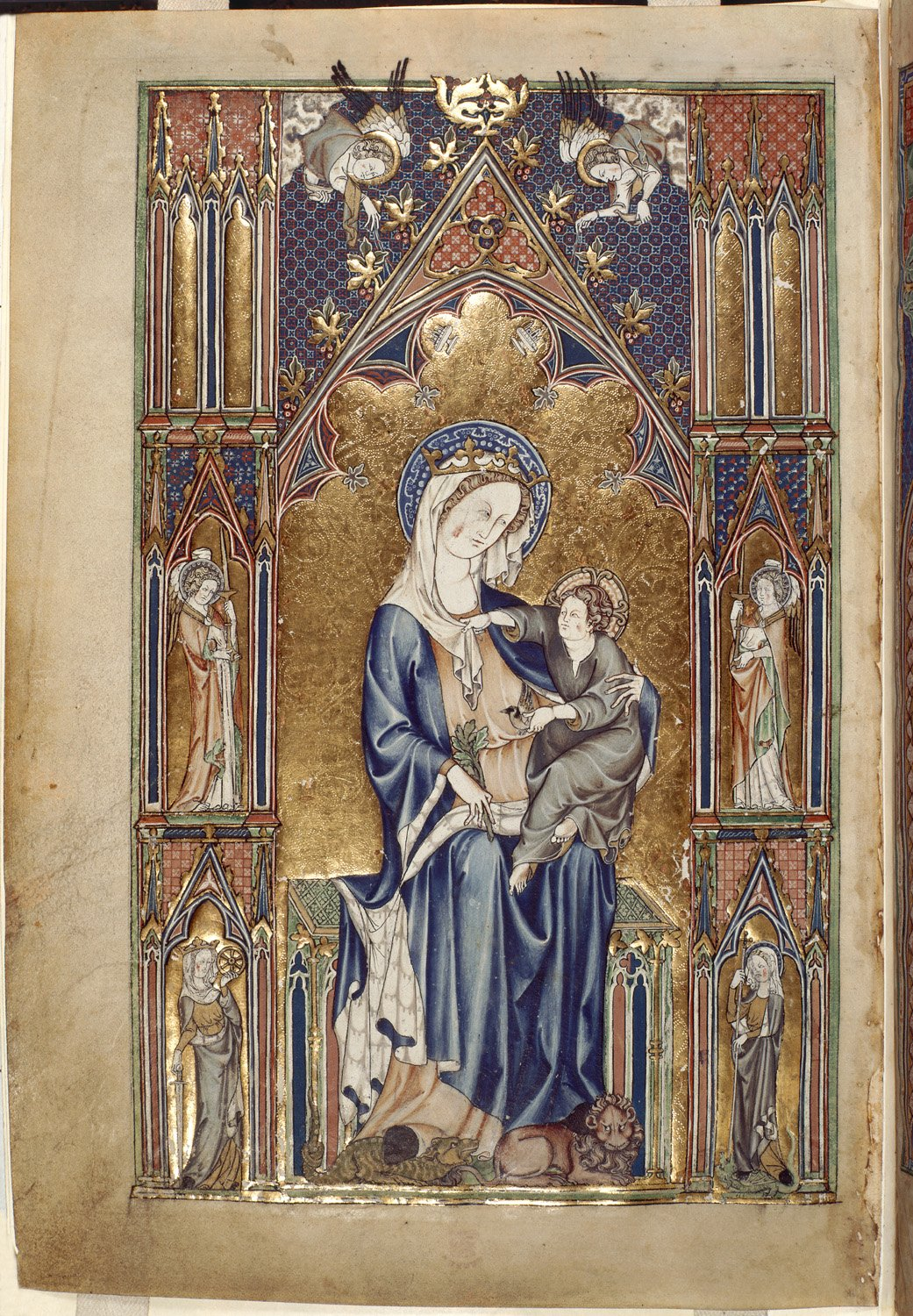
Miniature of the Virgin and Child. The Virgin's feet rest on a dragon and a lion. She is seated in an elaborate Gothic arched canopy, with niches containing two angels and the saints Catherine of Alexandria and Margaret of Antioch.
Madonna Master from the De Lisle Psalter.

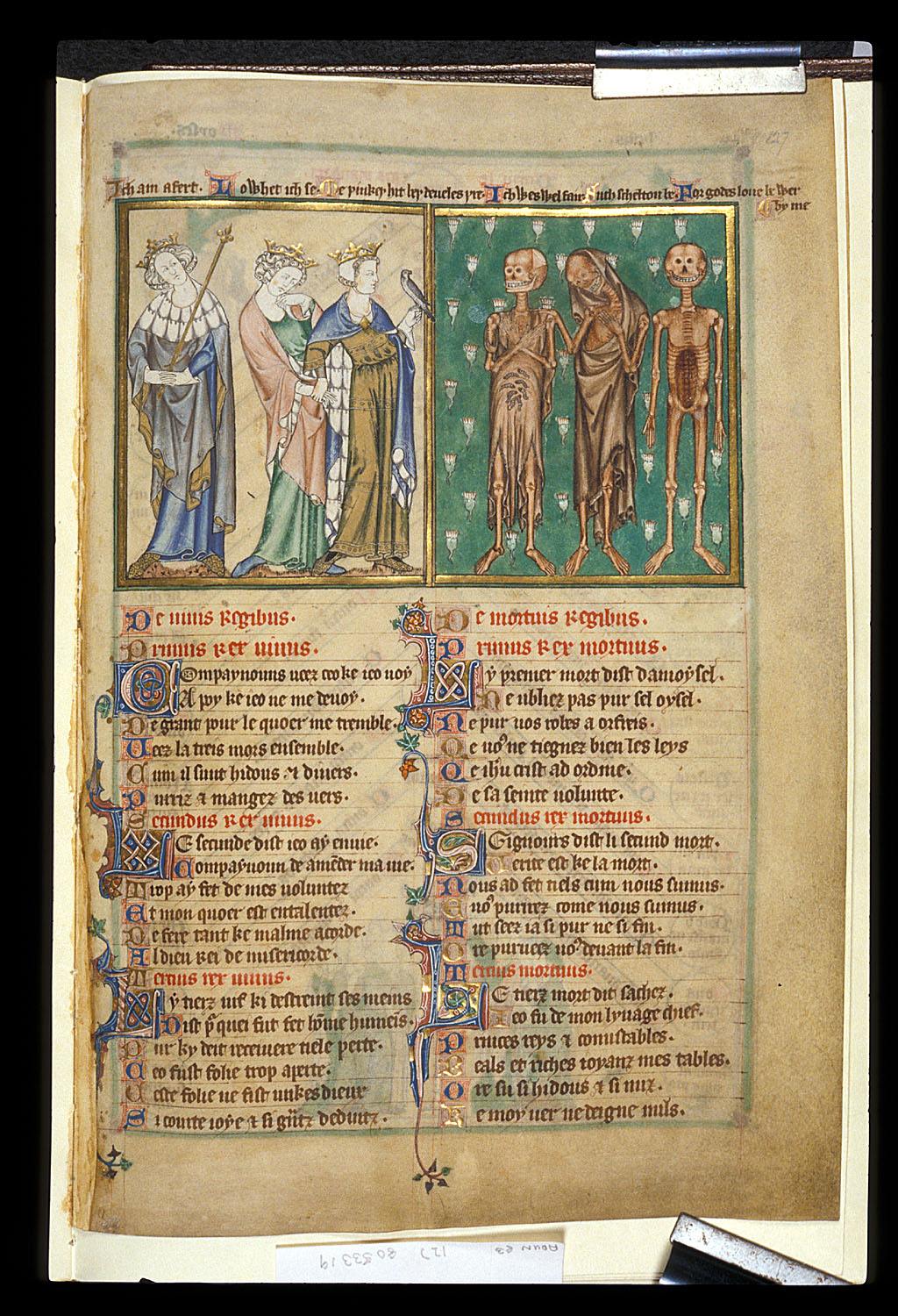
Les trois mors et les trois vis from the De Lisle Psalter.

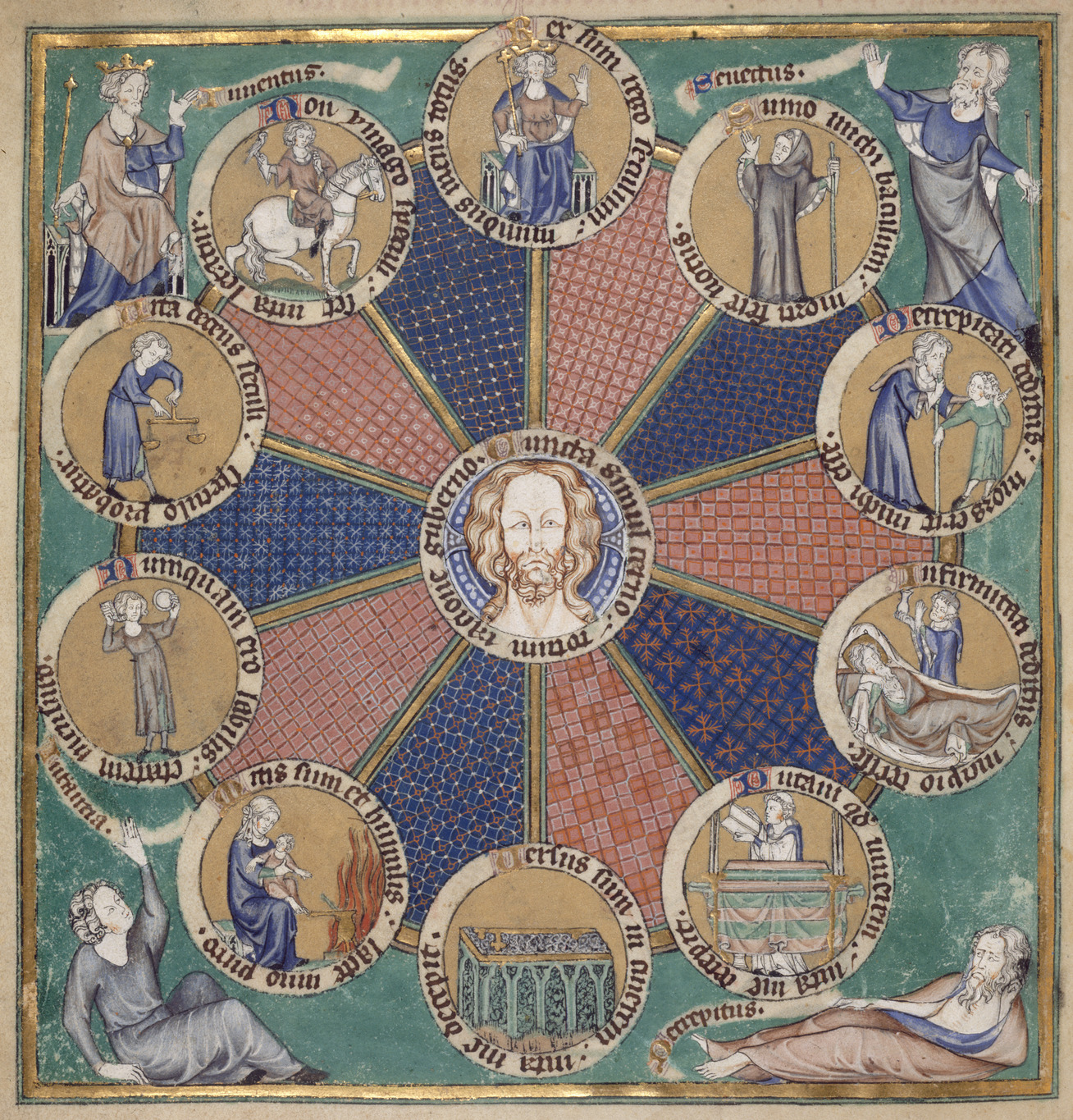
Wheel of the ten ages of men from the De Lisle Psalter.

== Sources ==
- British Library Catalog of Illuminated Manuscripts
- Hourihane, Colum (6 December 2012). The Grove Encyclopedia of Medieval Art and Architecture. OUP USA. ISBN 978-0-19-539536-5.
