= Daniel of Morley =

English scholastic philosopher and astronomer

Daniel of Morley (c. 1140 – c. 1210) was an English scholastic philosopher and astronomer.

== Life ==
He apparently came from Morley, Norfolk, and is said to have been educated at Oxford. Thence he proceeded to the University of Paris, and applied himself especially to the study of mathematics, but dissatisfied with the teaching there he left for Toledo, then famous for its school of Arabian philosophy. At Toledo, he remained for some time.

Morley returned to England with a valuable collection of books. He was apparently disappointed at the neglect of science in England, and a passage in his book has been interpreted to mean that he was on the point of setting out again for foreign parts when he met John of Oxford, Bishop of Norwich, who persuaded him to remain. The date of Morley's death is unknown.

== Works ==
Morley was author of a book called both "The Philosophy of Master Daniel of Morley" (Latin: Philosophia Magistri Danielis de Merlac) and "The Book of Lower and Upper Natures" (Liber de Naturis Inferiorum et Superiorum). It was dedicated to John of Oxford. From the preface is derived all that is known of Morley's life.

The version in British Library Arundel MS 377 divides the work into two books: "On the Upper Part of the World" (De Superiori Parte Mundi) and "On the Lower Part of the World" (De Inferiori Parte Mundi). In it, Morley quotes frequently from Arabian and Greek philosophers and vaunts the superiority of the former. Like many medieval Arab sources, he includes several astrological superstitions.

Another copy of the work is in Oxford University's Corpus Christi MS 95, erroneously catalogued under W. de Conchys. This copy lacks the preface, and mentions a third book of the work beginning Seneca loquens ad Lucilium..., which is not in the Arundel MS.
