= Libellus de expugnatione Terrae Sanctae per Saladinum =

12th-century writing about the conquests of Saladin

Opening page of the Libellus in the British Library's Cotton MS Cleopatra B. I

The Libellus de expugnatione Terrae Sanctae per Saladinum (Latin for "Little Book about the Conquest of the Holy Land by Saladin"), also called the Chronicon Terrae Sanctae ("Chronicle of the Holy Land"), is a short anonymous Latin account of the conquests of Saladin (Ṣalāḥ al-Dīn) in the Holy Land between 1186 and 1191. The core of the text was written shortly after the events it describes and then supplemented by the addition of an account of the Third Crusade early in the thirteenth century. This probably took place at Coggeshall Abbey in England. Neither the original author nor the continuator/compiler is known by name.

== Naming ==
Both of the Latin names for the chronicle—Libellus de expugnatione Terrae Sanctae per Saladinum and Chronicon Terrae Sanctae—are modern inventions and neither the original title of the work. The former was coined by Edmond Martène and Ursin Durand in 1729. It has been retained by the work's most recent editors, who argue that libellus, which in the Middle Ages usually referred to a polemical or exegetical treatise, is a better descriptor than chronicon.

Later manuscripts do, however, use the terms chronicon or cronicon and their variants chronica or cronica. The earliest is manuscript P, which contains the title De captione Jerusalem ("On the Capture of Jerusalem") added to the margin by a late medieval hand. The same manuscript also contains the more conventional title Cronica de Terra Sancta ("Chronicle of the Holy Land") added by a modern hand. In the 16th or 17th century, somebody added the title Chronicon Terrae Sanctae expugnatae a Saladino ("Chronicle of the Holy Land Captured by Saladin") to manuscript V, which was copied also in V^{2}. V^{3}, on the other hand, entitles it Chronica de Captione Jerusalem a Sarracenis ("Chronicle of the Capture of Jerusalem by the Saracens"). In the 17th or 18th century, the title Cronicon Terrę Sanctę ("Chronicle of the Holy Land") was added to manuscript A, probably by Bishop Thomas Tanner.

== Manuscripts ==
The Libellus survives complete in four medieval parchment manuscripts and another three modern paper ones. Each has been assigned a letter (siglum):

- C : London, British Library, Cotton MS Cleopatra B. I, fols 2^{r}–23^{r}
  Earliest manuscript, copied at Coggeshall in the early 13th-century.
- A : London, College of Arms, Arundel MS 9, fols 1^{r}–15^{v}
  Early 13th-century manuscript copied at Coggeshall from C.
- V : Paris, Bibliothèque nationale de France, MS lat. 15076, fols 1^{r}–22^{v}
  13th-century manuscript copied at Coggeshall from C after 1216.
- P : Cambridge, Corpus Christi College, MS 343, fols 72^{v}–83^{r}
  14th-century manuscript copied from A.
- V^{1} : Paris, Bibliothèque nationale de France, MS lat. 14359, fols 44^{r}–79^{r}
  17th-century manuscript copied from V at the Abbey of Saint-Victor, Paris.
- V^{2} : Paris, Bibliothèque nationale de France, MS lat. 15077, fols 1^{r}–34^{r}
  17th-century manuscript copied from V at the Abbey of Saint-Victor, Paris, possibly in 1612.
- V^{3} : Paris, Bibliothèque nationale de France, MS lat. 17802
  17th-century manuscript copied from V at the Abbey of Saint-Victor, Paris. Contains only the Libellus.

== Synopsis ==
=== Structure ===
The Libellus is divided into 29 chapters, which historians group into three parts based on their source. The first part consists of the first 26 chapters, which contain an original account of events in Outremer between the death of King Baldwin V on 13 September 1186 to the Ayyubid occupation of Jerusalem on 2 October 1187. Special attention is paid to the loss of various Christian holy places.

The second part consists only of chapter 27, which consists of extracts from the Itinerarium peregrinorum that bring the narrative down to the summer of 1191, when King Richard of England and King Philip II of France arrived at the siege of Acre. The final two chapters form the third part. They purported to be a letter from Frederick I, Holy Roman Emperor, to Saladin and the latter's reply. Since the final three chapters—the second and third parts—are derivative of works that circulated independently, historians are mainly interested in the first part alone.

=== Narrative ===
The Libellus begins with an address to "your excellency" (uestra excellentia), which could refer to any high-ranking person ecclesiastical or secular. The focus of the work suggests that the original recipient was a churchman. The first part begins with the closure of the gates of Jerusalem following Baldwin V's death and before the coronation of Queen Sibylla and her husband, Guy of Lusignan. The discord between Guy and Raymond III of Tripoli almost leads to violence. When Saladin learns of it, he launches a raid into Galilee. The Libellus gives a description of the crusaders' defeat in the battle of Cresson (1 May 1187). The author laments the martyrdoms of Roger des Moulins, a certain Templar named Jakelin de Mailly and a Hospitaller named Henry of the Hospital. This defeat convinces Raymond to recognize Guy as king.

The Libellus describes Saladin's capture of Tiberias (2 July 1187) and criticises Guy's decision, against Raymond's advice, to march out to meet Saladin. Patriarch Heraclius of Jerusalem is made to look cowardly for delegating the responsibility to carry the True Cross out to the army. Guy's decision to pitch camp on 3 July is also criticised. At the ensuing battle of Hattin, the foot soldiers twice refuse Guy's order to fight citing their thirst. The army is routed and Guy is captured. The next part of the narrative lists the places Saladin's brother Saphadin took after Hattin, usually explaining the Biblical or spiritual significance of the places. Conrad of Montferrat is praised for his defence of Tyre.

The first part ends with the surrender of Jerusalem. The author labels as traitors those responsible, since they paid their own ransom to Saladin and hence paid to be disinherited. The poor are unable to pay. Saladin ritually cleanses the Temple Mount, the golden cross atop the Dome of the Rock is removed, the Church of the Holy Sepulchre is plundered and the gates of Jerusalem are closed to Christians. The narrative has come full circle: from the closing of the gates amidst the discord between Christians to the closing of the gates to all Christians by Saladin.

The second part of the narrative, which, being extracted from a different chronicle, differs in style, relates the voyage of Joscius, Archbishop of Tyre, to bring the news of Jerusalem's fall to Europe; the crusader vows of the Emperor Frederick I, King Philip II and King Henry II of England; the death of Frederick I on crusade; the release of Guy of Lusignan by Saladin; and the siege of Acre down to the arrival of the main armies of the Third Crusade.
