= Arundel Manuscripts =

The Arundel Manuscripts are the manuscripts collected by Thomas Howard (1585–1646), earl of Arundel and courtier during the reigns of James I and Charles I of England. Following the Great Fire of London in 1666, his grandson Henry Howard permitted the Royal Society to convene at Arundel House and allowed its fellows to access his library. By 1669, he had agreed to John Evelyn's request that the works be given to the Society but they remained at Arundel House until after he succeeded to the Duchy of Norfolk, by which point he had also been made Earl Marshal of England. He allowed Evelyn to begin removing books for the Society to be held by Gresham College in 1678 but set apart a large number of manuscripts to be kept by the College of Arms overseen by the Earl Marshal.

The part of the collection held by the Royal Society were purchased by the British Museum in 1831. They were later transferred to the British Library, where they form part of its manuscript collection.

Notable manuscripts in the British Library's Arundel collection include:

- BL Arundel MS 28: Jean de Venette's Chronicle
- BL Arundel MS 44: Speculum Virginum
- BL Arundel MS 48: Henry of Huntingdon's History of the English
- BL Arundel MS 57: Ayenbite of Inwyt
- BL Arundel MS 69: Netley Abbey's version of Roger of Howden's Chronicles
- BL Arundel MS 74: Bede's Ecclesiastical History of the English People
- BL Arundel MS 83: Howard Psalter and Hours & De Lisle Psalter
- BL Arundel MS 263: Codex Arundel
- BL Arundel MS 377: Daniel of Morley's Philosophia
- BL Arundel MS 524: Minuscule 476 New Testament
- BL Arundel MS 531: Diogenes Laertius's Lives of the Philosophers

The part of the collection that still remains with the College of Arms is sometimes distinguished as the Norfolk Manuscripts after Henry Howard's elevation to duke of Norfolk upon his brother's death in 1677.

Notable manuscripts in the College of Arms's Arundel collection include:

- Coll. Arm. Arundel MS 6: Bury Chronicle
- Coll. Arm. Arundel MS 9: Libellus de Expugnatione Terrae Sanctae per Saladinum
- Coll. Arm. Arundel MS 16: Bede's Ecclesiastical History of the English People
- Coll. Arm. Arundel MS 22: The Seege of Troye & Roman de Brut
- Coll. Arm. Arundel MS 30: Bury Chronicle
- Coll. Arm. Arundel MS 57: Cursor Mundi
