= Lord Frederick Howard =

English politician in Ireland

Lord Frederick Henry Howard (September 1684 – 16 March 1727) was an English politician who sat in the Irish House of Commons.

Howard was a younger son of Henry Howard, 6th Duke of Norfolk by his second wife, Jane Bickerton. He was an officer in the 3rd Regiment of Foot Guards. Howard was the Member of Parliament for Duleek between 1716 and his death in 1727.

He married Catherine Blake, likely in 1716. They had no children.

Parliament of Ireland
Preceded by Thomas Trotter; Francis Harrison	Member of Parliament for Duleek; 1716-1727; With: Thomas Trotter	Succeeded by Thomas Trotter; Stephen Ram
