= Jane Howard, Duchess of Norfolk =

English noblewoman (1643/44–1693)

Her Grace The Duchess of Norfolk
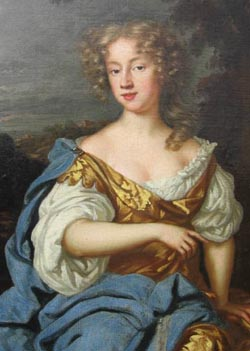
- The Duchess of Norfolk in 1678, by Sir Peter Lely
- Born: Jane Bickerton; 1643 or 1644
- Died: 28 August 1693
- Spouse: Henry Howard, 6th Duke of Norfolk
- Issue: Lord George Howard; Lord James Howard; Lord Frederick Howard; Lady Catherine Howard; Elizabeth Howard, Duchess of Gordon; Lady Philippa Howard
- Father: Robert Bickerton
- Mother: Anne Hester

Jane Howard, Duchess of Norfolk (née Bickerton; 1643 or 1644 – 28 August 1693), was the second wife of Henry Howard, 6th Duke of Norfolk.

Bickerton came from a very modest social background. Her parents were Anne Hester and Robert Bickerton, Gentleman of the Wine Cellar to King Charles II of England. She met Howard when he was heir presumptive to his unmarried brother Thomas and became his mistress. She started living with him after the death of his wife, Lady Anne Somerset, in 1662. Upon his brother's death in 1677, Howard succeeded to the dukedom and made his marriage to Bickerton public, though it may have taken place a year earlier, with the Duke's children by Lady Anne Somerset protesting against the marriage. The family quarrel became so bitter that the Duke went abroad for a time with his new wife.

The Duke and Duchess of Norfolk had four sons, all of whom died childless, and three daughters:

- Lord George Howard, married but childless
- Lord James Howard, drowned unmarried in August 1702
- Lord Frederick Henry Howard (d. 16 March 1727), married but childless
- Lady Catherine Howard, a nun in Flanders
- Lady Elizabeth Howard, m. George Gordon, 1st Duke of Gordon, had issue. Later became a nun in Flanders
- Lady Philippa Howard (d. January 1683), who had issue

After the Duke's death in 1684, the Duchess married a Scot, Thomas Maxwell.

John Evelyn had a very low opinion of her: on a visit to the Duke not long before the latter's death he wrote uncharitably:

"Went to visit the Duke of Norfolk and to know whether he would sell me any of his cartoons and other drawings of Raphael and the great masters. He answered me that he would part with and sell anything for money but his wife the Duchess who stood near him; and I thought with myself that if I were in his condition she should be the first thing that I would be glad to part with."
