= Lectionary 188 =

Lectionary ℓ 188
- New Testament manuscript
- Text: Evangelistarion †
- Date: 11th century
- Script: Greek
- Now at: British Library
- Size: 27 cm by 19.4 cm

Lectionary 188, designated by siglum ℓ 188 (in the Gregory-Aland numbering) is a Greek manuscript of the New Testament, on parchment leaves. Palaeographically it has been assigned to the 11th century. Scrivener labelled it by 260^{ev}.

== Description ==
The codex contains Lessons from the Gospels of John, Matthew, Luke lectionary (Evangelistarium) with lacunae at the beginning. The five leaves at the beginning were supplemented by a later hand on paper. The text is written in Greek minuscule letters, on 274 (two volumes 141 + 133) parchment leaves (27 cm by 19.4 cm), in two columns per page, 20 lines per page.

There are daily lessons from Easter to Pentecost.

== History ==
It is dated by a colophon to the year 1032 or 1033. The manuscript was written by Arion, a monk. It was purchased for the British Museum in 1786.

The manuscript was examined by Bloomfield. It was added to the list of New Testament manuscripts by Scrivener (number 260). Gregory saw it in 1883.

The manuscript is not cited in the critical editions of the Greek New Testament (UBS3).

Currently the codex is located in the British Library (Add. 5153) at London.

== See also ==
- List of New Testament lectionaries
- Biblical manuscript
- Textual criticism

== Bibliography ==
- Kirsopp Lake & Silva Lake, Dated Greek Minuscule Manuscripts to the Year 1200 (Boston 1934) II, p. 68.
