= Thomas Howard, 5th Duke of Norfolk =

English nobleman (1627–1677)

His Grace The Duke of Norfolk
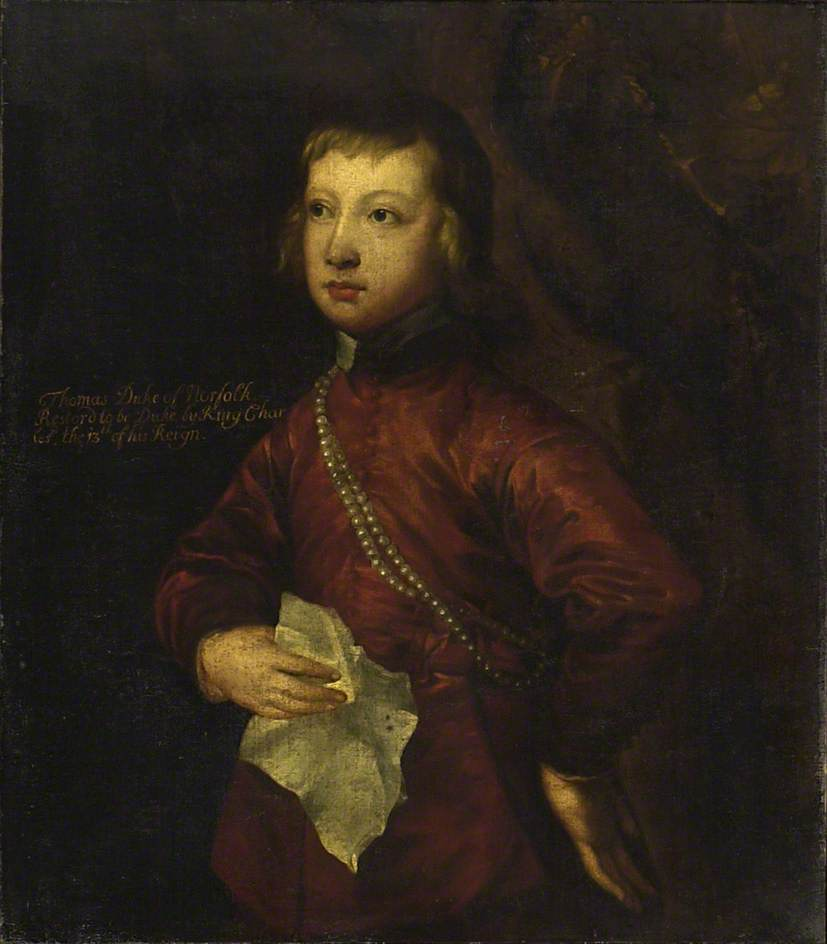
- Howard as a child, "little Tom", in 1635 by Anthony van Dyck

Member of the House of Lords Lord Temporal

Duke of Norfolk
- In office 29 December 1660 – 13 December 1677
- Preceded by: The 4th Duke of Norfolk (title forfeited 1572, vacant 1572 – 1660)
- Succeeded by: The 6th Duke of Norfolk

Personal details
- Born: 9 March 1627 Arundel House, England
- Died: 13 December 1677 (aged 50) Padua, Republic of Venice
- Resting place: Arundel
- Parents: Henry Howard, 15th Earl of Arundel (father); Lady Elizabeth Stuart (mother)

Thomas Howard, 5th Duke of Norfolk (9 March 1627 – 13 December 1677) was an English nobleman who from 1645 was deemed a lunatic. Born the eldest son of Henry Howard, 15th Earl of Arundel, Howard left England to study at Utrecht University at the start of the English Civil War. While visiting his paternal grandfather at Padua in 1645 he contracted a fever that damaged his brain. He was declared insane and confined in Padua with a physician caring for his needs. He became Earl of Arundel upon the death of his father in 1652.

Unable to coherently manage his English estates, the running of them was given over to his next eldest brother, Henry Howard, who acted in his place. In 1660 Henry successfully petitioned the House of Lords to have the attainted title Duke of Norfolk restored. Howard, as eldest son in a line descended from Thomas Howard, 4th Duke of Norfolk, became 5th Duke of Norfolk. He never returned to England, being kept at Padua until his death in 1677.

Howard's younger brothers and uncle, William Howard, 1st Viscount Stafford, questioned his lunacy several times. It was suggested that Henry was holding Howard at Padua in bad faith in order to reap the benefits of representing him in England. Parliament unsuccessfully ordered Howard to return in 1659, and two petitions from his brothers in 1675 and 1677 to do the same were turned down. He died childless; his family ensured that he never married so that he could not produce an heir who might inherit his mental disorder.

== Early life and inheritance ==
Thomas Howard was born on 9 March 1627 at Arundel House. He was the eldest son of Henry Frederick Howard, Baron Maltravers, and Lady Elizabeth Stuart, the daughter of Esme Stuart, 3rd Duke of Lennox. Howard, like all his brothers, was initially educated at St John's College, Cambridge. In 1641 the English Civil War was brewing and he left the country with his grandfather Thomas Howard, 14th Earl of Arundel. Howard continued his learning at Utrecht University while his grandfather lived in Antwerp. Philip Howard, one of Howard's brothers, also went to mainland Europe with his grandfather. Philip went on to go travelling in Italy, where he joined the Dominican Order and eventually became a cardinal.

Howard's grandfather, who was created Earl of Norfolk in 1644, never returned to England, dying at his villa in Padua on 4 October 1646. Howard's father, who had also been elevated, becoming Baron Mowbray in 1640, inherited the earldoms, becoming 15th Earl of Arundel. Howard in turn took on the courtesy title of Baron Maltravers. His father spent the rest of his life refusing to consent to the 14th Earl's will, which left most revenues to his widow Alethea Howard, Countess of Arundel, and attempting to overturn it. His own estates were sequestered twice, in 1646 and 1651. Financial issues and the rift between Howard's father and grandmother continued until he predeceased her on 15 April 1652; Howard's grandmother chose to leave her inheritance to his uncle, William Howard, 1st Viscount Stafford, rather than to him and his siblings. (Note: Disagreements over Alethea Howard's inheritance were still ongoing as late as 1714.)

Howard was still living in mainland Europe. Succeeding his father, he became 16th Earl of Arundel, inheriting entailed estates including Arundel Castle and Arundel House, but also debts from his grandfather's time amounting to £200,000 (equivalent to £36,100,000 in 2025). His grandmother died on 3 June 1654, leaving him to succeed her in the baronies of Furnivall, Strange of Blackmere, and Talbot.

== Insanity ==
Having travelled from Utrecht to visit his family in Padua in 1645, Howard fell ill there with a fever that caused him brain damage, leaving him "to sink into irredeemable lunacy" according to the biographer John Martin Robinson. There was no specific diagnosis for lunacy at this time, and mental disorders were instead judged by whether the victim could still manage their own affairs. Howard, whose behaviour was similar to that of a toddler, was determined to be a lunatic "by visitation of God". Howard never left Padua, being cared for by Henry Yerbury, an English physician, and his household controlled by a local Italian, Carlo Theobaldi. The man who inherited his father's honours in 1652 was described by a visiting Sir John Reresby as showing:

"all the Symptoms of Lunacy and Distraction"

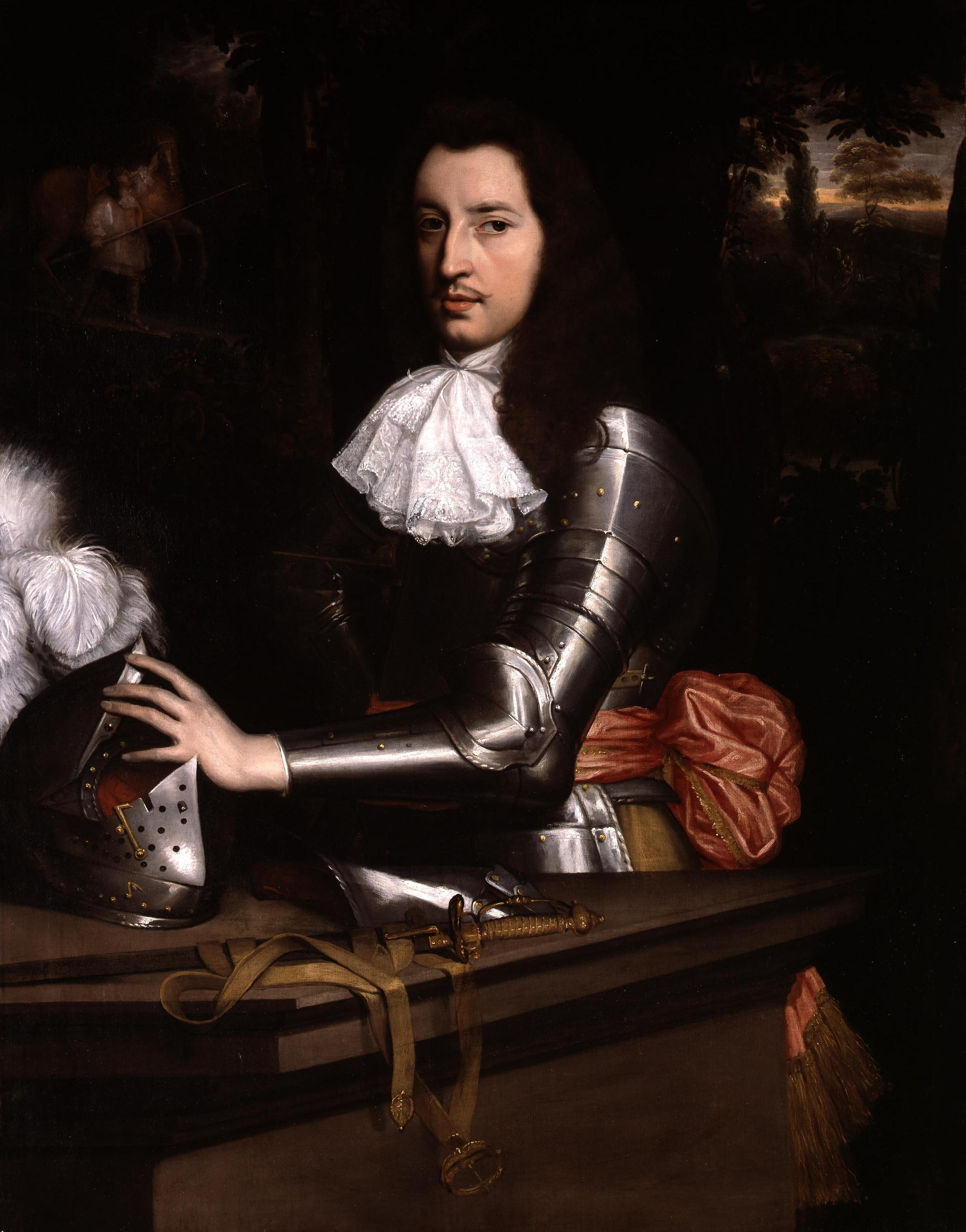
Howard's brother Henry represented him in England

Being both abroad and insane, Howard was unable to manage his English estates. This role was taken on by his next eldest brother, Henry Howard. When this situation first came about, rumours were spread that Howard was being kept against his will in Padua so that Henry could take advantage of the powerful position left in his absence. His uncle Stafford was one of these, claiming in 1656 that Howard was being "kept in cruel slavery in Padua". The Venetian Resident in London reported to refute this claim that:

"The Earl is living at Padua to the entire satisfaction of his mother and relations and is maintained there by his brother here with great generosity and splendour"

The Podestà of Padua reported less diplomatically that Howard was:

"unapproachable...an incurable maniac"

Henry managed Howard's finances and estates for the rest of his life, fully in the expectation that as Howard was unmarried he would eventually inherit them. The family monitored Howard and his condition, ensuring that he had no opportunity to marry whilst insane so that his malady could not be passed on. In the wake of the English Civil War Henry lived at Howard's Albury Park. By 1662 he had compounded Howard's debts and was working to restore the Howard family's power in Norfolk, which had waned considerably in the last century. He worked on vanity projects for the family, including the restoration of the Ducal palace in Norwich. The entailed nature of Howard's properties left Henry unable to access much of the family finances, leading him to bemoan them and his siblings to accuse him of mismanaging the family and withholding money from them.

== Dukedom and death ==
Earl of Arundel's Restoration Act 1660
- Act of Parliament
- Parliament of England
- Long title: An Act for Restitution of Thomas Earl of Arrundell, Surrey, and Norfolke, to the Dignity and Title of Duke of Norfolke.
- Citation: 12 Cha. 2. c. 17 Pr.
- Territorial extent: England and Wales

Dates
- Royal assent: 29 December 1660
- Commencement: 25 April 1660 (Note: Start of session.)
Other legislation
Relates to	Earl of Arundel's Restoration Act 1661

Status: Current legislation

Howard's grandfather had been nicknamed "The Collector Earl" partially for his interest in obtaining peerages for the Howard family. His ultimate goal was to reverse the attainder of the Dukedom of Norfolk, which had not been completed at the time of his death in 1646. When the Stuart Restoration returned the monarchy to England in 1660, Henry recommenced this endeavour and on 30 August introduced a bill to the House of Lords to have the dukedom restored to his family. This was successful and the Earl of Arundel's Restoration Act 1660 (12 Cha. 2. c. 17 Pr.) received royal assent on 29 December the same year. Of the more than ninety peers who supported the petition, seven of them were members of the Howard family.

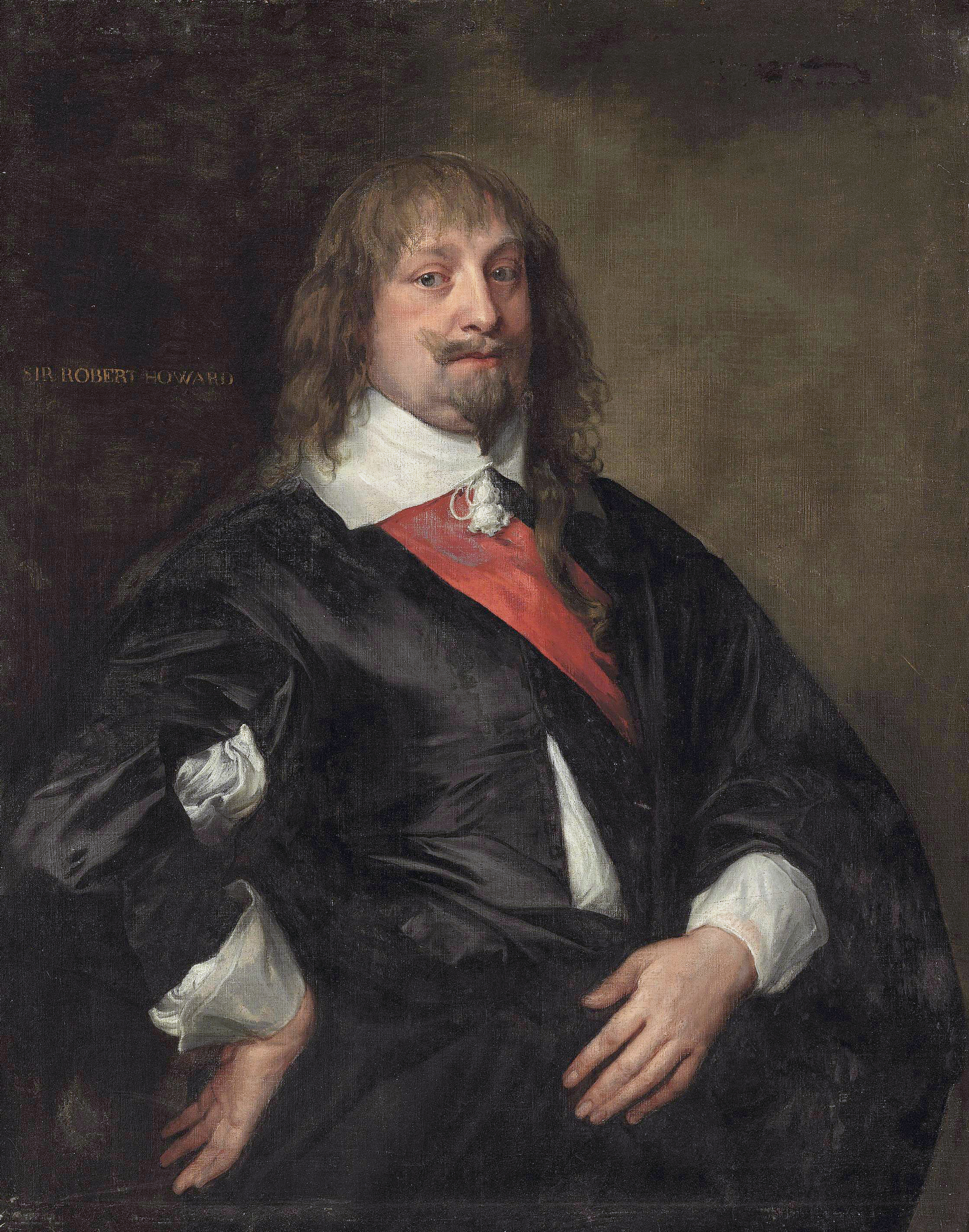
Sir Robert Howard deemed Howard too "ignominious to his family" to be returned to England

Earl of Arundel's Restoration Act 1661
- Act of Parliament
- Parliament of England
- Long title: An Act confirming an Act for Restitution of Thomas Earl of Arundell, Surrey, and Norfolke, to the Dignity and Title of Duke of Norfolke.
- Citation: 13 Cha. 2. St. 2. c. 4 Pr.
- Territorial extent: England and Wales

Dates
- Royal assent: 20 December 1661
- Commencement: 20 November 1661
Other legislation
Relates to	Earl of Arundel's Restoration Act 1660

Status: Current legislation

Howard, as eldest son and despite his insanity, received the restored dukedom as 5th Duke, succeeding his great-great-grandfather Thomas Howard, 4th Duke of Norfolk, who had forfeited the title for treason in 1572. The act was more precisely defined a year later in a new act, Earl of Arundel's Restoration Act 1661 (13 Cha. 2. St. 2. c. 4) on 20 December 1661. On 27 May 1675 Howard's brother Philip was created a cardinal by Pope Clement X, and while travelling to Rome to take up service there he stopped at Howard's Padua villa. Henry allowed him via letter to take "a good store of silver plate, and some very good moveables" from the guardianship of Yerbury in order to establish himself properly, titling himself Cardinal of Norfolk.

In his later life Howard's younger brothers became concerned that he was not insane and that Henry was acting in bad faith. Parliament had unsuccessfully ordered Howard to return to England in 1659, and in 1674 and 1677 the brothers petitioned the House of Commons for his return. The Commons denied these petitions, choosing to believe the testimony of visitors like Reresby and in fear of what allowing such an important but insane man into the country might result in. One of those who opposed the petition in 1674 was Sir Robert Howard, Howard's cousin. Responding to a petition from Howard's brother Bernard, in the Commons he described Howard as a "sad spectacle", and argued that returning him to England would be "in some measure ignominious to his family".

Howard died at Padua on 13 December 1677, ending worries that he would surprisingly outlive his brother. Henry, who had been created Baron Howard of Castle Rising in 1669 and Earl of Norwich and Earl Marshal in 1672, succeeded him as 6th Duke of Norfolk. Howard's body was brought back to England a year after his death, being buried at Arundel on 11 December 1678.

== Citations ==
Peerage of England
Preceded by Henry Howard	Earl of Arundel; Earl of Surrey; Earl of Norfolk; Baron Mowbray; Baron Segrave; Baron Maltravers; 1652–1677	Succeeded by Henry Howard
Preceded by Alethea Howard	Baron Furnivall; Baron Talbot; Baron Strange of Blackmere; 1654–1677	Succeeded by Henry Howard
Vacant forfeited 1572 Title last held by Thomas Howard	Duke of Norfolk; 1660–1677	Succeeded by Henry Howard
