= Henry Howard, 6th Duke of Norfolk =

English nobleman and politician (1628–1684)

His Grace The Duke of Norfolk
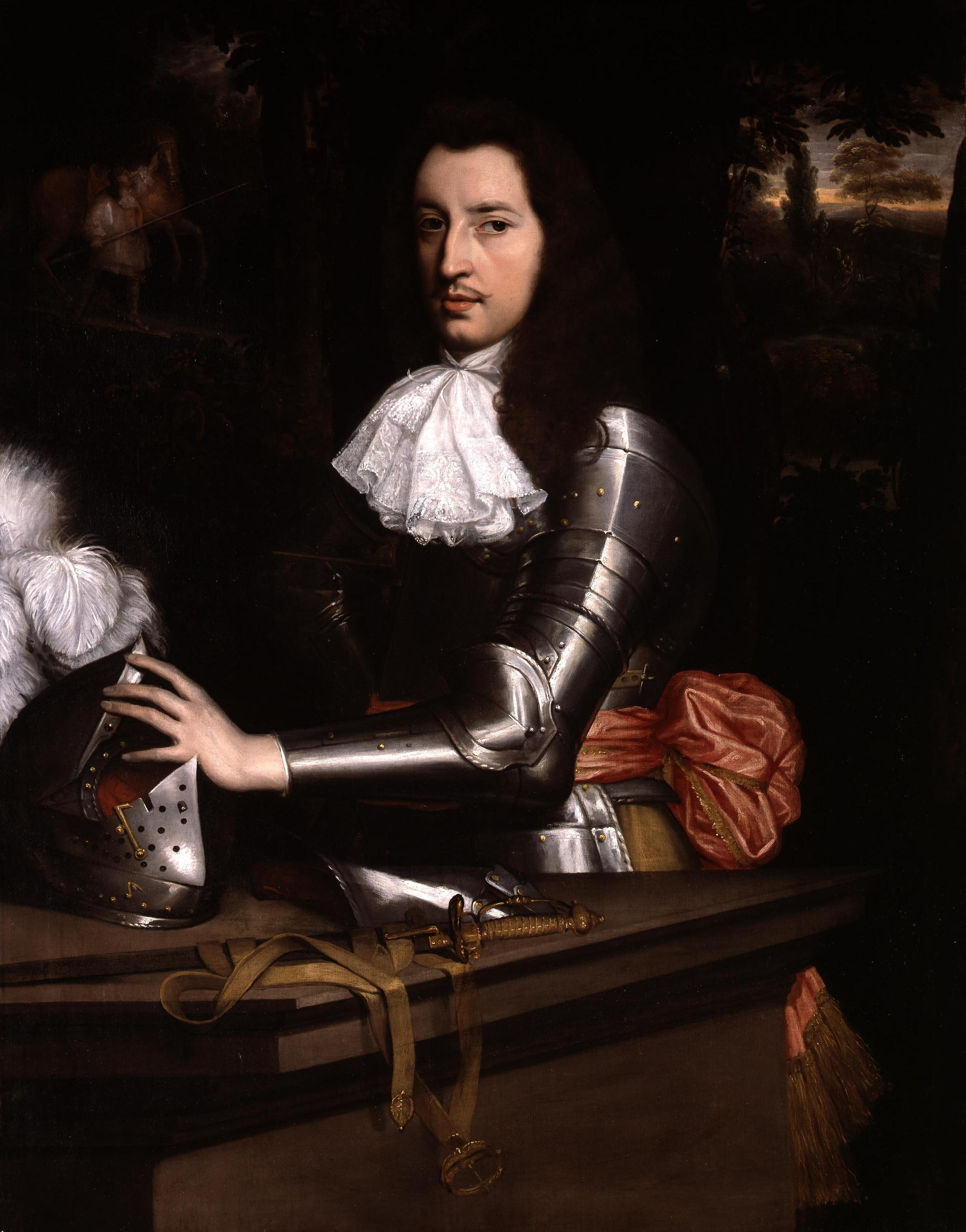
- Portrait by John Michael Wright

Earl Marshal
- In office 1672 – 13 January 1684
- Monarch: Charles II
- Preceded by: In Commission
- Succeeded by: The 7th Duke of Norfolk

Member of the House of Lords Lord Temporal
- In office 13 December 1677 – 13 January 1684; Hereditary Peerage
- Preceded by: The 5th Duke of Norfolk
- Succeeded by: The 7th Duke of Norfolk

Personal details
- Born: 12 July 1628 Arundel House, London, England
- Died: 13 January 1684 (aged 55) Arundel House, London, England
- Resting place: Arundel Castle, Arundel, West Sussex
- Spouse(s): Lady Anne Somerset; Jane Bickerton
- Children: Henry Howard, 7th Duke of Norfolk; Frances de Andía-Irarrazaval, Marchioness of Valparaiso; Lord Thomas Howard; Lord George Howard; Lord James Howard; Lord Frederick Henry Howard; Lady Catherine Howard; Elizabeth Gordon, Duchess of Gordon; Lady Philippa Howard
- Parent(s): Henry Howard, 22nd Earl of Arundel; Lady Elizabeth Stuart

Henry Howard, 6th Duke of Norfolk (12 July 1628 – 13 January 1684) was an English nobleman and politician. He was the second son of Henry Howard, 15th Earl of Arundel, and Lady Elizabeth Stuart. He succeeded his brother Thomas Howard, 5th Duke of Norfolk, after Thomas's death in 1677.

== Life ==
Henry Howard's older brother Thomas contracted a fever while visiting their grandfather Thomas in Padua in 1645 that subsequently left him mentally disabled and unable to administer his own affairs. There was near unanimity in the House of Lords in persuading King Charles II to revive the Dukedom of Norfolk for the Howard family in 1660 but, as this descended from Henry's great-great-grandfather Thomas to his brother Thomas who was still confined to an asylum in Padua, Henry managed the duchy's affairs in his name.

Following the Great Fire of London in 1666, Henry Howard allowed the Royal Society to meet regularly at Arundel House. Having befriended John Evelyn, he followed Evelyn's guidance to provide some of his grandfather's Grecian statues to Oxford University, principally to get them out of the corrosive London air. He further agreed to bestow his grandfather's collection of manuscripts to the Royal Society, but it initially remained at Arundel House for want of a dedicated library elsewhere.

It being felt desirable to be able to summon Henry to the Lords in his own right, he was created 1st Baron Howard of Castle Rising in 1669 and 1st Earl of Norwich in 1672, on the latter occasion obtaining the restoration of the office of Earl Marshal of England to him and to his family. Henry's career in the Lords began inauspiciously when he announced that he had married Jane Bickerton, who had been his mistress for many years. This caused a violent family quarrel, as a result of which he went abroad for a time. Nonetheless, he wielded considerable political influence and in 1673 was able to find a safe seat in Parliament for Samuel Pepys.

After succeeding to the duchy on his brother Thomas's death in 1677, he began to transfer his manuscript collection to Gresham College for the Royal Society but—having become Earl Marshal in the interim—he also granted a large number of works to the library of the College of Arms overseen by that position. The two separate collections are still preserved as the Arundel Manuscripts.

In January 1678, he took his seat in the House of Lords, but in August the first development of the Popish Plot was followed by an Act for disabling Catholics from sitting in either house of Parliament. As a sincere Roman Catholic, he would not comply with the oath recognizing the King as Head of the Church; at the same time he urged his fellow peers to do so if their consciences permitted, to ensure the survival of the House of Lords as an institution, whereupon the Lords thanked him for his "good service". He withdrew to Bruges for three years. There he built a house attached to a Franciscan convent and enjoyed freedom of worship. He later gave away the greater part of his library, grounds, and rooms to the Royal Society, and the Arundelian marbles to Oxford University.

He was presented as a recusant at Thetford assizes in 1680, and felt obliged to return to England to answer the charge, which was not pursued; a previous accusation by the notorious informer William Bedloe in 1678 that he had been party to, or at least aware of a plot to kill the King, had simply been ignored.

He remained in England long enough to sit as a peer at the trial for treason of his uncle, William Howard, 1st Viscount Stafford, a fellow victim of the Popish Plot. Unfortunately for Stafford, who was notoriously "a man not beloved by his family", he had quarrelled with most of his relatives, including Norfolk, and with the exception of Norfolk's eldest son, the future 7th Duke of Norfolk, the eight Howard peers present, including the 6th Duke, voted him Guilty. Stafford was beheaded on 29 December; the Duke does not seem to have interceded for his uncle's life. He returned to Bruges for a time.

With the waning of the hysteria, he felt it safe to return home. John Evelyn in his diary for 9 May 1683 records visiting him to discuss buying some of his artworks, and gives the diarist's very low opinion of the Duchess. From Evelyn's description, it is clear that the Duke then had an impressive collection of "cartoons and drawings of Raphael and the Great Masters".

== Marriages and issue ==
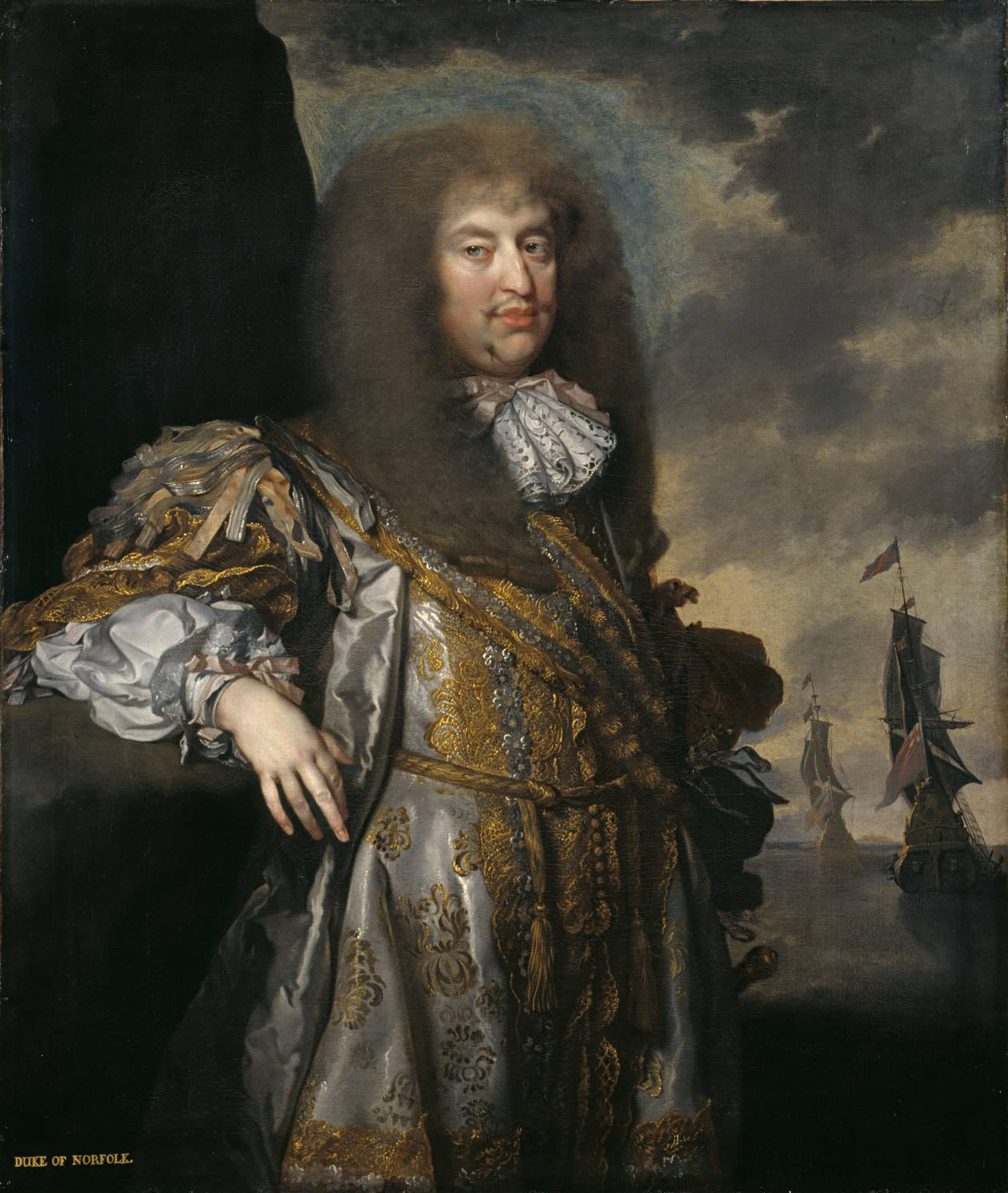
Portrait of Henry Howard by Gerard Soest, c. 1670–1675. This portrait was once part of the Lenthall collection and is now owned by the Tate Gallery.

About 1652, Howard married Lady Anne Somerset, daughter of Edward Somerset, 2nd Marquess of Worcester, and Elizabeth Dormer. They had at least four children:

- Lady Elizabeth Howard, married George Gordon, 1st Duke of Gordon
- Henry Howard, 7th Duke of Norfolk, married the Baroness Mordaunt, no issue
- Lady Frances Howard, married Sebastián Gonzalez de Andía-Irarrazaval, Marquess of Valparaiso, Viscount of Santa Clara de Avedillo, Count of Villaverde
- Lord Thomas Howard (1662–1689), married Mary Elizabeth Savile and had issue:
  - Thomas Howard, 8th Duke of Norfolk
  - Anne Howard
  - Mary Howard, married Walter Aston, 4th Lord Aston of Forfar and had issue
  - Edward Howard, 9th Duke of Norfolk
  - Philip Howard (ancestor of the Baron Mowbray, considered heir general of the Howard family and Talbot family)

His second wife was Jane Bickerton. She had been his mistress for many years prior to the marriage in 1676 or 1677, and its announcement caused a violent quarrel with his eldest son and heir. They had four sons, all of whom died childless, and three daughters:

- Lady Philippa Howard (1678–1731), married Ralph Standish (died in 1755), who had a daughter
- Lord George Howard, married but childless
- Lord James Howard, drowned unmarried in August 1702
- Lord Frederick Henry Howard (died 16 March 1727), married but childless
- Lady Catherine Howard, a nun in Flanders.

The peerages created for him died out with his grandson the 9th Duke in 1777, though the current Baron Mowbray descends from the 9th Duke's brother. The 10th and 11th Dukes of Norfolk, who inherited the associated peerages and office of Earl Marshal, descended from his brother Lord Charles Howard of Greystoke, and the 12th and later Dukes from his brother Lord Bernard Howard of Glossop.

== Family ==
=== Ancestry ===
Ancestors of Henry Howard, 6th Duke of Norfolk

8. Philip Howard, 20th Earl of Arundel
4. Thomas Howard, 21st Earl of Arundel
9. The Hon. Anne Dacre
2. Henry Howard, 22nd Earl of Arundel
10. Gilbert Talbot, 7th Earl of Shrewsbury
5. Alethea Talbot, 13th Baroness Furnivall
11. Mary Cavendish
1. Henry Howard, 6th Duke of Norfolk
12. Esmé Stuart, 1st Duke of Lennox
6. Esmé Stuart, 3rd Duke of Lennox
13. Catherine de Balzac
3. Lady Elizabeth Stuart
14. Gervase Clifton, 1st Baron Clifton
7. Katherine Clifton, 2nd Baroness Clifton
15. Katherine Darcy

=== Family tree ===
Family tree of the Dukes of Norfolk and Suke of Surrey; Earls of Arundel, East Anglia, Norfolk, Norwich, Nottingham, and Surrey; and Barons Mowbray, Segrave and Stourton

Earl of East Anglia (Earls of Norfolk and Suffolk) (1st creation), before 1069
Ralph the Staller c. 1011–1068; 1st Earl of Norfolk and Suffolk, or of the East Angles (c. 1066/67–1068)
Earl of Surrey (1st creation), c. 1088
Ralph de Gael c. 1040 – c. 1096; 2nd Earl of Norfolk and Suffolk, or of the East Angles (until 1074)	Roger Bigod of Norfolk d. 1107	William de Warenne c. 1035–1088; 1st Earl (of) Warenne / Earl of Surrey, Lord of Lewes, Seigneur de Varennes
Earldom forfeit, 1074
Earl of Norfolk (2nd creation), 1141
King Henry I c. 1068–1135	Maud Bigod	Hugh Bigod; 1095–1177; 1st Earl of Norfolk (1141–1177)	William de Warenne d. 1138; 2nd Earl (of) Warenne / Earl of Surrey
Earl of Arundel, Earl of Sussex (1st creations), c. 1138
Empress Matilda c. 1102–1167	Geoffrey Plantagenet; 1113–1251; Count of Anjou	Adeliza of Louvain c. 1103–1151	William d'Aubigny c. 1109–1176; 1st Earl of Arundel, Earl of Sussex, Earl of Lincoln	William de Warenne; 1119–1148; 3rd Earl of Surrey
King Henry II; 1133–1189	William d'Aubigny b. c. 1138/1150–1176; 2nd Earl of Arundel, Earl of Sussex	Roger Bigod c. 1144/1150–1221; 2nd Earl of Norfolk (1189–1221, disputed 1177–1189)	William of Blois c. 1137–1159	Isabel de Warenne c. 1130 – 1203; 4th Countess of Surrey suo jure	Hamelin de Warenne c. 1130–1202; Comte de Warenne / Earl of Surrey, jure uxoris
King John; 1166/1167–1216	William d'Aubigny before 1180–1221; 3rd Earl of Arundel, Earl of Sussex	Hugh Bigod; 1186–1225; 3rd Earl of Norfolk (1221–1225)	Maud Marshal; 1192–1248	William de Warenne c. 1160s/1170s–1240 5th Earl of Surrey
William d'Aubigny c. 1203–before 1224; 4th Earl of Arundel, Earl of Sussex	Hugh d'Aubigny d. 1243; 5th Earl of Arundel, Earl of Sussex	Isabel d'Aubigny	John Fitzalan; 1200–1240; 3rd Lord of Clun and Oswestry	Roger Bigod c. 1209–1270; 4th Earl of Norfolk (1233–1270)	Hugh Bigod c. 1211–1266
King Henry III; 1207–1272	John Fitzalan; 1223–1267; 6th Earl of Arundel, Earl of Sussex, jure matris	John de Warenne; 1231–1304; 6th Earl of Surrey
Baron Segrave of Se(a)grave, 1283
Nicholas Segrave c. 1238–bef. 1295; 1st Baron Segrave	King Edward I 1239–1307	Edmund Crouchback; 1245–1296; Earl of Lancaster	John Fitzalan; 1246–1272; 7th Earl of Arundel, Earl of Sussex, jure matris	Roger Bigod c. 1245–1306; 5th Earl of Norfolk (1270–1306)
Earldom extinct, 1270
Baron Mowbray, 1283	Earl of Arundel (2nd (1st by writ) creation), 1289
John Segrave c. 1256–1325; 2nd Baron Segrave	Roger de Mowbray; 1254–1297; 1st Baron Mowbray	Richard Fitzalan; 1267–1302; 1st (or 6th) Earl of Arundel	William de Warenne; 1256–1286
Earl of Norfolk (3rd creation), 1312
Stephen Segrave d. 1325; 3rd Baron Segrave	Thomas of Brotherton; 1300–1338; 1st Earl of Norfolk (1312–1338)	John Mowbray; 1286–1322; 2nd Baron Mowbray	Henry c. 1281–1345; Earl of Leicester, Earl of Lancaster	Edmund Fitzalan; 1286–1326; 2nd (or 7th) Earl of Arundel	Alice de Warenne; 1287–1388 heir apparent to the Earldom of Surrey	John de Warenne; 1286–1347; 7th Earl of Surrey
Earldom of Arundel (2nd creation) forfeit, 1326
Earldom of Arundel (2nd creation) restored, 1331
John Segrave; 1315–1353; 4th Baron Segrave	Margaret of Brotherton; 1320–1399; 2nd Countess of Norfolk (1338–1399), Duchess of Norfolk "for life" (1397–1399)	John Mowbray; 1310–1361; 3rd Baron Mowbray	Joan of Lancaster c. 1312–1349	Eleanor of Lancaster; 1318–1372	Richard FitzAlan c. 1313–1376; 3rd (or 8th) Earl of Arundel, 8th Earl of Surrey
Baron Arundel, 1377
Elizabeth de Segrave; 1338–1368; 5th Baroness Segrave	John de Mowbray; 1340–1368; 4th Baron Mowbray	Richard FitzAlan; 1346–1397; 4th (or 9th) Earl of Arundel, 9th Earl of Surrey	John FitzAlan c. 1348–1379; 1st Baron Arundel	Alice FitzAlan
Earldom of Arundel (2nd creation) forfeit, 1397
Earl of Nottingham (1st creation), 1377	Earl of Nottingham (2nd creation), 1383; Duke of Norfolk (1st creation), 1397	Duke of Surrey, 1397
John de Mowbray; 1365–1383; 1st Earl of Nottingham, 6th Baron Segrave, 5th Baron Mowbray	Thomas de Mowbray; 1366–1399; 1st Duke of Norfolk (1397–1399), 3rd Earl of Norfolk (1399), 7th Baron Segrave, 6th Baron Mowbray	Elizabeth Fitzalan; 1366–1425	John FitzAlan; 1364–1390; 2nd Baron Arundel	Thomas Holland; 1372–1400; Duke of Surrey, Earl of Kent, Baron Holland
Earldom of Nottingham extinct, 1383	Titles forfeit, 1399	Dukedom of Surrey renounced, 1400
Baron Stourton, 1448	Duke of Norfolk (1st creation restored), 1425	Earldom of Arundel (2nd creation) restored, 1400
John Stourton; 1400–1462; 1st Baron Stourton (1448–1462)	Thomas de Mowbray; 1385–1405; 4th Earl of Norfolk, 8th Baron Segrave, 7th Baron Mowbray (1399–1405)	John de Mowbray; 1392–1432; 2nd Duke of Norfolk (1425–1432), 5th Earl of Norfolk, 9th Baron Segrave, 8th Baron Mowbray (1405–1432)	Margaret de Mowbray c. 1388–1459	Robert Howard; 1385–1436	Isabel de Mowbray c. 1400–1452	Thomas FitzAlan; 1381–1415; 5th (or 10th) Earl of Arundel, 10th Earl of Surrey	John Fitzalan; 1385–1421; 6th (or 11th) Earl of Arundel, 3rd Baron Arundel, 3rd Baron Maltravers
Duke of Norfolk (4th creation), 1483
William Stourton before 1426–1478; 2nd Baron Stourton (1462–1478)	John de Mowbray; 1415–1461; 3rd Duke of Norfolk, 6th Earl of Norfolk, 10th Baron Segrave, 9th Baron Mowbray (1432–1461)	John Howard; 1425–1485; 1st Duke of Norfolk, 13th Baron Segrave, 12th Baron Mowbray (1483–1485)	John Fitzalan; 1408–1435; 7th (or 12th) Earl of Arundel, 4th Baron Arundel, 4th Baron Maltravers	William Fitzalan; 1417–1487; 9th (or 14th) Earl of Arundel, 6th Baron Arundel, 6th Baron Maltravers
Titles forfeit, 1485
Earl of Surrey (2nd creation), 1451	Duke of Norfolk (4th creation) restored and Earl of Surrey, 1514
John Stourton c. 1454–1485; 3rd Baron Stourton (1479–1485)	William Stourton c. 1457–1524; 5th Baron Stourton (1487–1524)	John de Mowbray; 1444–1476; 4th Duke of Norfolk, 7th Earl of Norfolk, Earl of Surrey, 11th Baron Segrave, 10th Baron Mowbray (1461–1476)	King Edward IV; 1442–1483	Thomas Howard; 1443–1524; 2nd Duke of Norfolk, 1st Earl of Surrey (1514–1524)	Humfrey Fitzalan; 1429–1438; 8th (or 13th) Earl of Arundel, 5th Baron Arundel, 5th Baron Maltravers	Thomas Fitzalan; 1450–1524; 10th (or 15th) Earl of Arundel, 7th Baron Arundel, 7th Baron Maltravers
Dukedom of Norfolk, Earldom of Nottingham, Earldom of Surrey extinct, 1476
Duke of Norfolk (3rd creation), Earl of Nottingham (3rd creation), and Earl of Surrey, 1477
Francis Stourton; 1485–1487; 4th Baron Stourton (1485–1487)	Edward Stourton; 1463–1535; 6th Baron Stourton (1524–1535)	Anne de Mowbray; 1472–1481; 8th Countess of Norfolk, 12th Baroness Segrave, 11th Baroness Mowbray (1476–1481)	Richard of Shrewsbury; 1473–1483; Duke of York, Duke of Norfolk, Earl of Nottingham, Earl of Warenne (1477–1483)	Anne of York; 1475–1511	Thomas Howard; 1473–1554; 3rd Duke of Norfolk, 2nd Earl of Surrey (1524–1554)	Edmund Howard c. 1478–1539	Elizabeth Boleyn c. 1480–1538	William Fitzalan; 1476–1544; 11th (or 16th) Earl of Arundel, 8th Baron Arundel, 8th Baron Maltravers
Earldom of Norfolk extinct and Baronies Segrave and Mowbray in abeyance, 1481	Dukedom of Norfolk, Earldom of Nottingham, Earldom of Surrey extinct, 1483	Attainted, 1547; Restored, 1553
William Stourton c. 1505–1548; 7th Baron Stourton	Earl of Nottingham (5th creation), 1525	King Henry VIII; 1491–1547	Anne Boleyn c. 1501 or 1507–1536
Viscount Howard of Bindon, 1559
Charles Stourton c. 1520–1557; 8th Baron Stourton	Henry Howard; 1517–1547 styled Earl of Surrey	Thomas Howard c. 1520–1582; 1st Viscount Howard of Bindon	Mary FitzRoy; 1519–1557	Henry FitzRoy; 1519–1536; Duke of Richmond and Somerset, Earl of Nottingham	Catherine Howard c. 1524–1542	Henry Fitzalan; 1512–1580; 12th (or 17th) Earl of Arundel, 9th Baron Arundel, 9th Baron Maltravers
Earldom of Nottingham extinct, 1536
Thomas Howard; 1536–1572; 4th Duke of Norfolk, 3rd Earl of Surrey, 13th Baron Mowbray (1554–1572)	Henry Howard; 1540–1614; Earl of Northampton	Queen Elizabeth I 1533–1603	Mary FitzAlan; 1540–1557
Dukedom (3rd creation) forfeit, 1572
Earl of Arundel (3rd creation), 1580	Earl of Suffolk (4th creation), 1603
John Stourton; 1553–1588; 9th Baron Stourton	Edward Stourton c. 1555–1633; 10th Baron Stourton	Philip Howard; 1557–1595; 20th/13th/1st Earl of Arundel, styled Earl of Surrey	Thomas Howard; 1561–1626; Earl of Suffolk	Lord William Howard; 1563–1640
Earldom of Arundel and Barony of Mowbray attainted, 1589	see Earls, Marquesses, and Dukes of Suffolk family tree
Earl of Arundel (3rd creation) and Barony of Mowbray restored, 1604; Earl of Norfolk (5th creation), 1644
William Stourton c. 1594–1672; 11th Baron Stourton	Thomas Howard; 1585–1646; 21st/14th/2nd Earl of Arundel, 2nd/4th Earl of Surrey, 1st Earl of Norfolk, 14th Baron Mowbray (1644–1646)	Philip
see Earls of Shrewsbury family tree
Edward Stourton; 1617–1644	Henry Frederick Howard; 1608–1652; 22nd/15th/3rd Earl of Arundel, 3rd/5th Earl of Surrey, 2nd Earl of Norfolk, 15th Baron Mowbray (1646–1652)	Alethea Howard; 1585–1654; 17th Baroness Strange of Blackmere, 14th Baroness Talbot, 13th Baroness Furnivall	William Howard; 1614–1680; 1st Viscount Stafford	William
Duke of Norfolk (4th creation restored), 1660	Baron Howard of Castle Rising, 1669; Earl of Norwich (3rd creation), 1672
William Stourton d. 1685; 12th Baron Stourton	Thomas Howard; 1627–1677; 5th Duke of Norfolk, 21st/14th/2nd Earl of Arundel, 4th/6th Earl of Surrey, 16th Baron Mowbray (1660–1677); 18th Baron Strange of Blackmere, 15th Baron Talbot, 14th Baron Furnivall (1654–1677)	Henry Howard; 1628–1684; 6th Duke of Norfolk, 22nd/15th/3rd Earl of Arundel, 5th/7th Earl of Surrey, 1st Earl of Norwich, etc. 18th Baron Strange of Blackmere, 17th Baron Mowbray, 15th Baron Talbot, 14th Baron Furnivall (1672–1684)	Charles Howard; 1630–1713	Col. Bernard Howard; 1641–1717	Charles Howard, 1st Earl of Carlisle Earls of Carlisle
Edward Stourton; 1665–1720; 13th Baron Stourton	Thomas Stourton; 1667–1744; 14th Baron Stourton	Charles Stourton; 1669–1739	Henry Howard; 1655–1701; 7th Duke of Norfolk, 22nd/15th/3rd Earl of Arundel, 5th/7th Earl of Surrey, 2nd Earl of Norwich, etc. 18th Baron Mowbray, 19th Baron Strange of Blackmere, 15th Baron Talbot, 14th Baron Furnivall (1684–1701)	Lord Thomas Howard; 1662–1689	Henry Charles Howard d. 1720
Thomas Howard; 1683–1732; 8th Duke of Norfolk, 23rd/16th/4th Earl of Arundel, 6th/8th Earl of Surrey, 3rd Earl of Norwich, etc. 18th Baron Strange of Blackmere, 15th Baron Talbot, 14th Baron Furnivall, 19th Baron Mowbray (1701–1732)	Edward Howard; 1685–1777; 9th Duke of Norfolk, 24th/17th/5th Earl of Arundel, 7th/9th Earl of Surrey, 4th Earl of Norwich, etc. 20th Baron Mowbray, 20th Baron Strange of Blackmere, 15th Baron Talbot, 14th Baron Furnivall (1732–1777)	Philip Howard; 1688–1750	Bernard Howard; 1674–1735
Earldom of Norwich (3rd creation) and Barony of Howard of Castle Rising extinct and Baronies of Furnivall, Mowbray, Segrave, Strange of Blackmere, and Talbot abeyant, 1777
Charles Stourton; 1702–1753; 15th Baron Stourton	William Stourton; 1704–1781; 16th Baron Stourton	Winifred Howard; 1726–1753	Anne Howard; 1742–1787	Charles Howard; 1720–1786; 10th Duke of Norfolk, 25th/18th/6th Earl of Arundel, 8th/10th Earl of Surrey (1777–1786)	Henry Howard; 1713–1787
Charles Philip Stourton; 1752–1816; 17th Baron Stourton	Charles Howard; 1746–1815; 11th Duke of Norfolk, 26th/19th/7th Earl of Arundel, 9th/11th Earl of Surrey (1786–1815)
William Stourton; 1776–1846; 18th Baron Stourton	Bernard Howard; 1765–1842; 12th Duke of Norfolk, 27th/20th/8th Earl of Arundel, 10th/12th Earl of Surrey (1815–1842)
Charles Stourton; 1802–1872; 19th Baron Stourton	Henry Howard; 1791–1856; 13th Duke of Norfolk, 28th/21st/9th Earl of Arundel, 11th/13th Earl of Surrey (1842–1856)
Baron Mowbray and Baron Segrave abeayance restored, 1878	Baron Howard of Glossop
Alfred Joseph Stourton; 1829–1893; 24th Baron Segrave, 21st/23rd Baron Mowbray, 20th Baron Stourton	Henry Granville Fitzalan-Howard; 1815–1860; 14th Duke of Norfolk, 29th/22nd/10th Earl of Arundel, 12th/14th Earl of Surrey (1856–1860)	Edward George Fitzalan-Howard; 1818–1883; 1st Baron Howard of Glossop
Charles Botolph Joseph Stourton; 1867–1936; 25th Baron Segrave, 22nd/24th Baron Mowbray, 21st Baron Stourton	Henry Fitzalan-Howard; 1847–1917; 15th Duke of Norfolk, 30th/23rd/11th Earl of Arundel, 13th/15th Earl of Surrey, Lord Maltravers, Earl of Arundel and Surrey (1860–1917)	Francis Fitzalan-Howard; 1859–1924; 2nd Baron Howard of Glossop
William Marmaduke Stourton; 1895–1965; 26th Baron Segrave, 23rd/25th Baron Mowbray, 22nd Baron Stourton	Bernard Fitzalan-Howard; 1908–1975; 16th Duke of Norfolk, 31st/24th/12th Earl of Arundel, 14th/16th Earl of Surrey (1917–1975)	Bernard Fitzalan-Howard; 1885–1972; 3rd Baron Howard of Glossop
Charles Edward Stourton; 1923–2006; 27th Baron Segrave, 24th/26th Baron Mowbray, 23rd Baron Stourton	Miles Fitzalan-Howard; 1915–2002; 17th Duke of Norfolk, 32nd/25th/13th Earl of Arundel, 15th/17th Earl of Surrey, 4th Baron Howard of Glossop (1975–2002)
Edward William Stephen Stourton; 1953–2021; 28th Baron Segrave, 25th/27th Baron Mowbray, 24th Baron Stourton	Edward Fitzalan-Howard b. 1956; 18th Duke of Norfolk, 33rd/26th/14th Earl of Arundel, 16th/18th Earl of Surrey, 5th Baron Howard of Glossop (from 2002)
James Charles Peter Stourton b. 1991; 29th Baron Segrave, 26th/28th Baron Mowbray, 25th Baron Stourton	Henry Fitzalan-Howard b. 1987 styled Earl of Arundel and Surrey

Political offices
Vacant In commission Title last held by The Earl of Suffolk	Earl Marshal; 1672–1684	Succeeded by The Duke of Norfolk
Peerage of England
Preceded by Thomas Howard	Duke of Norfolk; 1677–1684	Succeeded by Henry Howard
Preceded by Thomas Howard	Baron Mowbray (descended by acceleration); 1677–1678	Succeeded by Henry Howard
New creation	Earl of Norwich; 1672–1684	Succeeded by Henry Howard
New creation	Baron Howard of Castle Rising; 1669–1684	Succeeded by Henry Howard
