= Warenne family =

English noble family

- Noble family
- Coat of arms of the House of Warenne
- Country: Kingdom of England, United Kingdom
- Origin: Normandy, France
- Founded: 1088; 938 years ago
- Founder: William de Warenne, 1st Earl of Surrey
- Titles: Earl of Surrey; Earl of Warenne; Earl of Sussex; Earl of Strathearn; Lord of Reigate; Lord of Lewes; Lord of Grantham; Lord of Stamford; Lord of Whitchurch; Lord of Wormegay; Lord of Wakefield; Lord of Sandal; Lord of Conisbrough; Lord of Appleby; Baron Esneval; Seigneur de Varennes; Seigneur de Bellencombre
- Estates: Reigate Castle (Seat of the Earldom); Château de Bellencombre (Ancestral Seat); Conisbrough Castle; Castle Acre Castle; Lewes Castle; Holt Castle; Sandal Castle; Thetford Castle; Peel Hill Castle; Château de Mortemer
- Cadet branches: Warenne of Esneval; Warenne of Waverley; Warenne of Whitchurch; Warenne of Wormegay

The Warenne family is an English noble family founded by William de Warenne, who was created Earl of Surrey by William II Rufus in 1088. The family originated in Normandy and, as Earls, held land there and throughout England. William de Warenne was a cousin to William the Conqueror and was among his companions at the Battle of Hastings.
When the senior male-line ended in the mid-12th century, the two branches descended from their heiress adopted the Warenne surname. Several junior lines also held land or prominent offices in England and Normandy.

== Origin ==
The Warenne family derived their toponymic surname from the village of Varenne, river Varenne, near Arques-la-Bataille, Duchy of Normandy, now in the canton of Bellencombre, Seine Maritime.

William de Warenne, 1st Earl of Surrey is accepted as having been son of a Norman named Ranulf de Warenne, but the early Anglo-Norman chroniclers gave confusing and contradictory accounts of the origins and relatives of this family. In his additions to the Gesta Normannorum Ducum of William of Jumièges, chronicler Robert of Torigny reported that William de Warenne, 1st Earl of Surrey, and Anglo-Norman baron Roger of Mortemer were brothers, both sons of an unnamed niece of Gunnor, Duchess of Normandy, making the family akin to her great-grandson, William the Conqueror. Unfortunately, Robert's genealogies are somewhat confused, and he elsewhere makes Roger a son of William de Warenne, and yet again makes both the sons of Walter de Saint Martin. Likewise, several of the descents Robert gives for Gunnor's family appear to contain too few generations. Orderic Vitalis describes William as Roger's consanguineus, literally "cousin" but more generically a term of close kinship that is not typically used to describe brothers, and Roger de Mortemer appears to have been a generation older than William de Warenne.

Charters report several earlier men associated with Warenne. A Radulf de Warenne appears in two charters, one dated between 1027 and 1035, with a second dating from about 1050 and also naming his wife, Beatrice. A Roger son of Radulf de Warenne appears in a charter dated 1040/1053. In 1059, a Radulf appears with his wife Emma and their sons Radulf and William. These occurrences have historically been interpreted as representing a single Radulf with successive wives, with Beatrice being the mother of William and hence identical to Gunnor's unnamed niece. However, the 1059 charter explicitly names Emma as William's mother. A reevaluation of the evidence led Katherine Keats-Rohan to suggest that the traditional view has mistakenly compressed two distant men of the same name into a single chimeric individual. She sees the earliest known family members as Radulf (I) and his wife Beatrice. Associations with the village of Vascœuil led Keats-Rohan to identify the latter with a 1054/60 widow, Beatrice, daughter of Tesselin, vicomte of Rouen, and since another Rouen vicomte married a niece of Gunnor, this may represent the connection to the ducal family to which Robert de Torigny alluded. Keats-Rohan sees Radulf (I) and Beatrice as parents of a Radulf (II) and Roger de Mortimer, with Radulf (II) in turn being the 1059 husband of Emma and by her father of Radulf (III), the heir in Normandy, and Earl William. (Note: On Robert's genealogies, see also G. H. White, Eleanor Searle, Elisabeth van Houts, and Kathleen Thompson.)

=== Warenne Landholdings in the Domesday Book ===
Landholdings in the Domesday Book of William de Warenne, 1st Earl of Surrey
- Aylmerton, County of Norfolk
- Acre, County of Norfolk
- Aldborough, County of Norfolk
- Anmer, County of Norfolk
- Bagthorpe, County of Norfolk
- Banham, County of Norfolk
- Banningham, County of Norfolk
- Barmer, County of Norfolk
- Barnham Broom, County of Norfolk
- Barsham, County of Norfolk
- Barwick, County of Norfolk
- Blo' Norton, County of Norfolk
- Bodney, County of Norfolk
- Bradenham, County of Norfolk
- Brampton, County of Norfolk
- Briston, County of Norfolk
- Buckenham, County of Norfolk
- Burnham Thorpe, County of Norfolk
- Carlton, County of Cambridgeshire
- Chishill, County of Cambridgeshire
- Clipstone, County of Norfolk
- Coltishall, County of Norfolk
- Colton, County of Norfolk
- Colveston, County of Norfolk
- Congham, County of Norfolk
- Corpusty, County of Norfolk
- Cranwich, County of Norfolk
- South Creake, County of Norfolk
- Croxton near Fakenham, County of Norfolk
- Denver, County of Norfolk
- Deopham, County of Norfolk
- Didlington, County of Norfolk
- Downham Market, County of Norfolk
- Elsing, County of Norfolk
- Filby, County of Norfolk
- Fincham, County of Norfolk
- Flitcham, County of Norfolk
- Foulden, County of Norfolk
- Fransham, County of Norfolk
- Fring, County of Norfolk
- Fulmodeston, County of Norfolk
- Gayton, County of Norfolk
- Gimingham, County of Norfolk
- Great Ryburgh, County of Norfolk
- Gresham, County of Norfolk
- Gressenhall, County of Norfolk
- Grimston, County of Norfolk
- Griston, County of Norfolk
- Hackford near Reepham, County of Norfolk
- Harpley, County of Norfolk
- Hautbois, County of Norfolk
- Heacham, County of Norfolk
- Helhoughton, County of Norfolk
- Hempton, County of Norfolk
- Hilborough, County of Norfolk
- Hilgay, County of Norfolk
- Hillington, County of Norfolk
- Hingham, County of Norfolk
- Hockwold, County of Norfolk
- Holkham, County of Norfolk
- Houghton, County of Norfolk
- Ickburgh, County of Norfolk
- Illington, County of Norfolk
- Irmingland, County of Norfolk
- Itteringham, County of Norfolk
- Kempstone, County of Norfolk
- Kerdiston, County of Norfolk
- Kettlestone, County of Norfolk
- Kennett, County of Cambridgeshire
- Knapton, County of Norfolk
- Larling, County of Norfolk
- Letton, County of Norfolk
- Lexham, County of Norfolk
- Little Barningham, County of Norfolk
- Little Ellingham, County of Norfolk
- Little Ryburgh, County of Norfolk
- Little Snoring, County of Norfolk
- Mannington, County of Norfolk
- Marham, County of Norfolk
- Massingham, (Note: One or both of the neighbouring modern villages of Great Massingham and Little Massingham) County of Norfolk
- Mattishall, County of Norfolk
- Methwold, County of Norfolk
- Morley Saint Botolph, County of Norfolk
- Mundesley, County of Norfolk
- Mundford, County of Norfolk
- North Barningham, County of Norfolk
- North Barsham, County of Norfolk
- North Walsham, County of Norfolk
- Northwold, County of Norfolk
- Outwell, County of Norfolk
- Palgrave, County of Norfolk
- Paston, County of Norfolk
- Pickenham, County of Norfolk
- Pangdean, County of East Sussex
- Patcham, County of East Sussex
- Plumstead, County of Norfolk
- Poynings, County of East Sussex
- Rainthorpe (now Rainthorpe Hall, Flordon), County of Norfolk
- Repps, County of Norfolk (Southrepps)
- Repps, County of Norfolk (Northrepps)
- Rockland, (Note: There are three places in Norfolk called Rockland. Rockland All Saints and Rockland St Peter lie to the south-west of Norwich, and together make up the modern civil parish of Rocklands. Rockland St Mary lies to the south-east of Norwich. It is uncertain which one was meant. Rockland St Peter is listed separately, and Rockland St Mary was mentioned in the Domesday Book; but neither of those facts helps resolve the question) County of Norfolk
- Rockland St Peter, County of Norfolk
- Roudham, County of Norfolk
- Rougham, County of Norfolk
- Rudham, County of Norfolk (Now East & West Rudham)
- Saddlescombe, County of East Sussex
- Salthouse, County of Norfolk
- Santon, County of Norfolk
- Scarning, County of Norfolk
- Sco Ruston, County of Norfolk
- Shereford, County of Norfolk
- Shernborne, County of Norfolk
- Shipdham, County of Norfolk
- Sidestrand, County of Norfolk
- Snettisham, County of Norfolk
- South Acre, County of Norfolk
- Southburgh, County of Norfolk
- Stanfield, County of Norfolk
- Stanhoe, County of Norfolk
- Stibbard, County of Norfolk
- Stinton, County of Norfolk (now Stinton Hall, Salle)
- Sustead, County of Norfolk
- Syderstone, County of Norfolk
- Tattersett, County of Norfolk
- Taverham, County of Norfolk
- Thompson, County of Norfolk
- Thorpe Market, County of Norfolk
- Threxton, County of Norfolk
- Trumpington, County of Cambridgeshire
- Thurning, County of Norfolk
- Thuxton, County of Norfolk
- Tittleshall, County of Norfolk
- Toftrees, County of Norfolk
- Trunch, County of Norfolk
- Tuttington, County of Norfolk
- Waterden, County of Norfolk
- Weeting, County of Norfolk
- Weston Colville, County of Cambridgeshire
- West Wickham, County of Cambridgeshire
- West Wratting, County of Cambridgeshire
- Welborne, County of Norfolk
- West Dereham, County of Norfolk
- West Walton, County of Norfolk
- Whilton, County of Norfolk
- Wimsbotsham, County of Norfolk
- Wisbech, County of Cambridgeshire
- Witton Nr North Walsham, County of Norfolk
- Wolterton, County of Norfolk
- Wood Dalling, County of Norfolk
- Wood Rising, County of Norfolk
- Yelverton, County of Norfolk

== Titles ==
William de Warenne, 1st Earl of Surrey (died 1088), fought for William the Conqueror at the Battle of Hastings in 1066 and after was made the first Earl of Surrey with land in Surrey and twelve other counties. The family was based in Lewes, Sussex and had castles in Yorkshire, Normandy, and Reigate Castle in Surrey.

An account of the life of William de Warenne, 2nd Earl of Surrey (1088–1138) known as the Warenne Chronicle was written shortly after 1157, probably for his granddaughter Isabel de Warenne, Countess of Surrey and her husband William of Blois, Count of Boulogne. He had a brother Ralph who joined in charters with the 1st and 2nd Earls in the 1130s and 1140s, including a donations to Longueville and Bellencombe Priories, near Rouen, Normandy, and to the family's foundation, Lewes Priory in Sussex, England, the latter being secured with a lock of hair from his own and from Ralph's head cut by Henry of Blois, bishop of Winchester, before the altar of the priory church.

The family held the Earldom of Surrey for three generations, before William de Warenne, 3rd Earl of Surrey, died on crusade in 1148, leaving an only daughter and heiress, who married successively William of Blois, the son of King Stephen, and Hamelin, illegitimate half-brother of king Henry II. The latter adopted the Warenne surname and give rise to a second line of Surrey Earls that lasted until the death of John de Warenne, 7th Earl of Surrey in 1347, when Surrey passed via his sister to the FitzAlan Earls of Arundel.

The use of the title‘ ‘Earl of Warenne’ ‘ persisted among the direct line descendants of The Earls of Surrey and Warenne, and the two titles are said to have ‘split’. The Warenne family remain today the Earls of Warenne, while the Howard family presently hold the Earldom of Surrey.

=== Earls of Surrey ===
The medieval Warenne Earls were called Earl of Warenne at least as often as Earl of Surrey; but they received the 'third penny' of Surrey. This means that they were entitled to one third of the county court fines. The numbering of the earls follows the Oxford Dictionary of National Biography; some sources number Isabel's husbands as the fourth and fifth earls, increasing the numbering of the later earls by one.

- William de Warenne, 1st Earl of Surrey (died 1088)
- William de Warenne, 2nd Earl of Surrey (died 1138), earldom attainted in 1101, restored 1103
- William de Warenne, 3rd Earl of Surrey (1119–1148)
- Isabel de Warenne, 4th Countess of Surrey (died 1203)
  - William I, Count of Boulogne, Earl of Surrey (c. 1137–1159), her first husband, younger son of King Stephen of England.
  - Hamelin de Warenne, Earl of Surrey (died 1202), her second husband, illegitimate son of Geoffrey of Anjou. He was called Warenne after his marriage.
- William de Warenne, 5th Earl of Surrey (died 1240)
- John de Warenne, 6th Earl of Surrey (1231–1304)
- John de Warenne, 7th Earl of Surrey (1286–1347), grandson.

== Coat of Arms ==
The chequer arms of the Count of Vermandois were first adopted by William de Warenne, 2nd Earl of Surrey on his marriage to Elizabeth of Vermandois, Dowager Countess of Leicester, daughter to Hugh, Count of Vermandois. Similar arms were also adopted by his brother in law, the famous Crusader Ralph I de Beaugency who had married an older sister, Matilda. These arms continue to be used as the Flag of Surrey.

Coat of arms of the Warenne Family
Adopted 1118, by William de Warenne, 2nd Earl of Surrey on his marriage to Elizabeth of Vermandois, Dowager Countess of Leicester, daughter to Hugh, Count of Vermandois. Coronet A Coronet of an Earl. Crest On A Chapeau Gules, Turned Up Ermine, A Wyvern Argent, Wings Expanded Chequy Or And Azure. Helm Helm of a peer. Escutcheon Checky Or And Azure. Supporters On either side a Wyvern Argent, Wings Expanded Chequy Or And Azure. Motto Leo de juda est robur nostrum ("The Lion of Judah is our strength").

Warenne Coat of arms:
Checky Or And Azure.

Coat of arms of the Capetian Counts of Vermandois

Coat of arms of Hamelin de Warenne, Earl of Surrey (Husband to Isabel de Warenne, The Countess of Warenne):
Azure semy-de-lis or (France) Bordure Semy Gules lions passant guardant in pale Or armed and langued Azure (England) In Escutcheon Checky Or And Azure.

Flag of the County of Surrey, registered 2014

The heraldic badge of Surrey Herald of Arms Extraordinary

== Family Tree ==
Gautier de Saint-Martin, seigneur de Saint-Martin-sous-Bellencombre (925-980); Le Comte de Varenne	Sibell de Crepon, Comtesse de Varenne (930-1002)
Gautier de Saint-Martin (960-1007); Le Comte de Varenne	Emma de Torta, Comtesse de Varenne (961–1022)
Guillaume de Varennes; Le Comte de Varenne	Beatrice de Torta, Comtesse de Varenne
Ranulf I de Warenne; Le Comte de Varenne	Béatrice de Vascoeuïl, Comtesse de Varenne
Ranulf II de Warenne; Le Comte de Varenne	Emma Torta de Pont-Audemer, Comtesse de Varenne
Ranulf III de Warenne	Gundred, Countess of Surrey	William de Warenne (1035-1088); 1st Earl of Surrey (1088)	Frederick de Warenne
Edith de Warenne	William de Warenne (____-1138); 2nd Earl of Surrey (1088–1101,1103–1138)	Isabel de Vermandois, Countess of Surrey (c.1085 – 1131); Dowager Countess of Leicester	Robert de Beaumont (c. 1040/50-1118); 1st Earl of Leicester , Count of Meulan (1107-1118)	Reginald de Warenne
William de Warenne (1119-1148); 3rd Earl of Surrey (1138-1148)	Adela of Ponthieu, Countess of Surrey	Reginald de Warenne	Ralph de Warenne	Gundred de Warenne	Ada de Warenne
William of Blois; Count of Boulogne and Earl of Surrey (jure uxoris)	Isabel de Warenne (c.1137–1203); 4th Countess of Surrey (1148-1203)	Hamelin de Warenne (of Anjou) (c.1130–1202); Earl of Surrey (jure uxoris)	Waleran IV de Beaumont, (b. 1104); Count of Meulan, 1st Earl of Worcester eldest twin and heir	Robert de Beaumont 2nd Earl of Leicester & Earl of Hereford (born 1104), twin	Hugh de Beaumont (____-____); 1st Earl of Bedford	Emma de Beaumont	Adeline de Beaumont	Aubree de Beaumont	Agnes de Beaumont	Maud de Beaumont	Isabel de Beaumont
William de Warenne (c.1160/70-1240); 5th Earl of Surrey (1203-1240)	Maud Marshal, Countess of Surrey (1192–1248); Countess of Surrey, Dowager Countess of Norfolk	Hugh Bigod (c.1182-1225); 3rd Earl of Norfolk (1221–1225)	Adela de Warenne	Maud de Warenne (alias Matilda)	Isabel de Warenne
John de Warenne (1231-1304); 6th Earl of Surrey (1240-1304)	Alice de Lusignan, Countess of Surrey (1224–1256)	Hugh d'Aubiny (____-1243); 5th Earl of Arundel (1224–1243)	Isabel de Warenne, Countess of Arundel (1228–1282); Dowager Countess of Arundel
Henry de Percy (____-1272); 7th Baron of Topcliffe	Eleanor de Warenne	John de Balliol (c.1249-1314); King of Scots (1292-1296)	Isabella de Warenne, Lady of Balliol (c.1253-1292)	William de Warenne (1256–1286)	Joan de Vere
Maud de Nerford (1292-1345)	John de Warenne (1286-1347); 7th Earl of Surrey (1304–1347)	Joan of Bar, Countess of Surrey (c.1295-1361)	Edmund Fitzalan (1231-1304); 2nd Earl of Arundel (1306–1326)	Alice de Warenne, Countess of Arundel (1287-1338)
John de Warenne (1315-1353); 8th Earl of Warenne (1347–1353)	Thomas de Warenne (1317-____)	Edward de Warenne (1320-1369); 9th Earl of Warenne (1353–1369)	Cicely de Eaton, Countess of Warenne (1321-1361)	Isabel le Despenser, Countess of Arundel (1312-1374/5)	Richard Fitzalan (c. 1313-1376); 8th Earl of Surrey, 3rd Earl of Arundel (1326(Arundel), 1347(Surrey)-1376)	Eleanor of Lancaster (1318-1372)	Edmund Fitzalan (? - 1349)	Micheal Fitzalan	Mary Fitzalan, Baroness Strange of Blackmere (?-1396)	Aline Fitzalan, Baroness Strange (of Knockin) (?-1386)	Alice Fitzalan, Countess of Hereford (?-1326)	Katherine Fitzalan, Baroness Hussey (?-1375/76)	Eleanor Fitzalan, Baroness Lisle	Elizabeth Fitzalan, Baroness Latimer
John de Warenne (1343-1387); 10th Earl of Warenne (1369–1387)	Margaret de Stafford, Countess of Warenne (c1345-____)	Edward de Warenne (1345-1369)	William de Warenne (1347-____)	Sir Edmund de Arundel, Knt. (c. 1329–1381/2)	Elizabeth Fitzalan, Countess of Arundel and Surrey (c.1350-1385)	Richard Fitzalan ( ) 9th Earl of Surrey, 4th Earl of Arundel ()	Lady Philippa Mortimer (1375-1400)	John FitzAlan ( ) 1st Baron Arundel ()	Thomas Arundel ( ) Archbishop of Canterbury ()	Humphrey de Bohun ( ) 7th Earl of Hereford ()	Joan FitzAlan, Countess of Hereford	Thomas Holland ( ) 2nd Earl of Kent ()	Alice FitzAlan, Countess of Kent
Nicholas de Warenne (1371-1413); 11th Earl of Warenne (1387–1413)	Agnes de Wynnington, Countess of Warenne (1375-1417)	Margaret de Warenne (1374-____)	Isabel de Warenne (1377-____)	Thomas Fitzalan (1381-1415); 10th Earl of Surrey, 5th Earl of Arundel ()	Lady Eleanor Fitzalan (c.1365-1375)	Elizabeth Fitzalan, Duchess of Norfolk (c.1366-1425)	Joan Fitzalan, Baroness Bergavenny (1375-1435)	Alice Fitzalan, Baroness Cherleton (1378 – before October 1415)	Margaret Fitzalan	William Fitzalan
Lawrence de Warenne (1394-1444); 12th Earl of Warenne (1413–1444)	Margerey de Bulkeley, Countess of Warenne (1389-1440)	Emma de Warenne; 1413 (c1395-____)	Elizabeth de Warenne (c1397-____)
Lawrence de Warenne (c.1412-1413)	Margaret de Warenne (c.1413-____)	John de Warenne (1414-1475); 13th Earl of Warenne (1444–1475)	Isabel de Stanley, Countess of Warenne (1435-1460)	Cicely de Warenne (c1415-____)	Margery de Warenne (c1416-____)	Elizabeth de Warenne (c1417-____)	Randle de Warren (c1418-____)	Edward de Warenne (c1419-____)	Joan de Warenne (c1420-____)
Elizabeth Warenne (1433-____)	Lawrence Warenne (1435-1474)	Isabel Leigh (1440-1475)	Jane Warenne (1436-1508)	Margaret Warenne (1436-____)	Henry Warenne (1438-1492)	Richard Warenne (1439-1474)	John Warenne (1440-1518)	Joan Warenne (1444-____)
Jane Arderne, Countess of Warenne (c1475-____)	John Warenne (1459-1518); 14th Earl of Warenne (1475–1518)	Eleanor Gerard, Countess of Warenne (1467-1542)	William Warenne (1460-1506)	George Warenne (1462-____)	Richard Warenne (1465-____)	Anthony Warenne (1467-1557)	Laurence Warenne (1469-____)	Margaret Warenne (1495-1546)	Thomas Warenne (1496-1558)
Sibil Honford, Countess of Warenne (1500-____)	Laurence de Warenne (1476-1531); 15th Earl of Warenne (1518–1531)	Margaret Leigh, Countess of Warenne (1479-1545)	Richard Warenne (1477-1530)	Cicely Warenne (1480-____)	Nicholas Warenne (1482-____)	Ralph Warenne (1483-____)	John Warenne (1487-1525)	Christopher Warenne (1494-1587)	Margaret Ellen Leigh (1510-1575)
Margaret Warenne (1495-1546)	Cicely Warenne (1495-____)	Mabel Warenne (1496-____)	Edward Warenne (1498-1558); 16th Earl of Warenne (1531–1558)	Dorothy Booth, Countess of Warenne (1500-1584)	Ellen Warenne (1499-1551)	Dorothy Warenne (1503-____)	Randolph Warenne (1504-1562)	Ann Warenne (1506-____)	Richard Warenne (1507-1568)	Catherine Warenne (1508-____)	Jane Warenne (1509-____)	Isabel Warenne (1511-____)	George Warenne (1516-____)	Laurence Warenne (1516-____)	Grech Warenne (1520-____)
Ellen Warenne (1520-)	Joan Warenne (1523-)	Margaret Warenne (1527-)	Francis Warenne (1533-)	John Warenne (1535-1587); 17th Earl of Warenne (1558– 1587)	Margaret Molineaux, Countess of Warenne (1541-1617)	Lawrence Warenne (1537-1623)	Edward Warenne (1539-1542)	Peter Warenne (1544-1620)	Ethelred Warenne (1545-)	Ann Warenne (1546-)

== Cadet branches ==
=== Esneval ===
A likely brother of the 1st Earl of Surrey, another Rodulf, held lands that had been held by his father in the Pays de Caux and near Rouen. By 1172, these lands were in possession of Robert d'Esneval as a part of the barony of Esneval, and it is supposed that the family d'Esneval may derive from an heiress of this Rodulf's line.

=== Whitchurch ===
Among the holdings of William de Warenne, 1st Earl of Surrey was some land in Whitchurch, Shropshire, and this likely led to his kin becoming its early lords. A William fitz Ranulf is recorded as the lord of Whitchurch, first appearing in 1176, and was ancestor of a family that sometimes were called de Warenne, along with de Whitchurch, de Blancminster, and de Albo Monasterio. Robert Eyton considered it likely that Ralph de Warenne, son of William de Warenne, 2nd Earl of Surrey, was the father of this William, and that Ralph had likely been lord before William fitz Ranulf. It is known that Ralph de Warenne had a son named William, who confirmed and expanded a donation of Norfolk land that his father had made to Lewes Priory, and that the Whitchurch heirs likewise maintained an association with Lewes. Writing in 1923, William Farrer agreed. However, in a later publication Charles Travis Clay elaborated on Farrer's original work and drew attention to a Domesday tenant of William de Warenne, 1st Earl of Surrey, named Ranulf nepos (nephew). It does not specify of whom he was nephew, but Clay suggests it was his feudal overlord, Earl William. This Ranulf nepos held Middleton, Suffolk, which was later owned by William fitz Ranulf, Lord of Whitchurch, leading Clay to speculate that the Warennes of Whitchurch may instead have descended from this Domesday tenant rather than from the son of the 2nd Earl. William, son of William fitz Ranulf of Whitchurch, left a sole daughter and heiress, from whom the Whitchurch inheritance passed to Robert l'Estrange. Eyton suggested that Griffith de Warenne, the 13th century founder of the Warrens of Ightfield, Shropshire, was son of William fitz Ranulf de Warenne of Whitchurch.

=== Wormegay ===
Reginald de Warenne, younger brother of the 3rd Earl, married the heiress of Wormegay, Norfolk. His son William de Warenne of Wormegay was a royal justice under Richard I and John. After his death in 1209, Wormegay passed with his daughter to the Bardolf family.

== Other members of the Warenne family ==
- Ada de Warenne (or Adeline de Varenne) (c. 1120–1178)
- Alice de Warenne, Countess of Arundel (15 June 1287 – 23 May 1338)
- Isabella de Warenne (c. 1253 – before 1292)
- Reginald de Warenne (between 1121 and 1126 – 1179)
- William de Warenne (1256-1286), only son and heir apparent to John de Warenne, 6th Earl of Surrey
- William de Warenne (justice) (died c. 1208), justice of the Curia Regis

== Sources ==
- Anderson, John Corbet (1864). Shropshire, Its Early History and Antiquities ... Willis and Sotheran. pp. 402–404.
- Chisholm, Hugh, ed. (1911). "Warenne, Earls" . Encyclopædia Britannica. Vol. 28 (11th ed.). Cambridge University Press. p. 324.
- Dugdale, William (1693). Monasticon Anglicanum. Vol. V. London: Sam Keble.
- Eyton, R. W. (1859b). Antiquities of Shropshire. Vol. X. London: John Russell Smith. pp. 15–16.
- Eyton, R. W. (1859a). Antiquities of Shropshire. Vol. IX. London: John Russell Smith. pp. 209.
- Farrer, William (1925). Honors and Knights' Fees. Vol. 3. London: Spottiswoode, Ballantyne & Co. pp. 370–74.
- Farrer, William; Clay, Charles Travis (1949). Early Yorkshire Charters: Volume 8, The Honour of Warenne. Cambridge University Press.
- Keats-Rohan, K. S. B. (1993). "Aspects of Torigny's Genealogy Revisited". Nottingham Medieval Studies. 37: 21–27. doi:10.1484/J.NMS.3.213.
- Houts, Elisabeth Van; Love, Rosalind (2013). The Warenne (Hyde) Chronicle. Vol. 67. Oxford University Press. p. xii.
- Sanders, I.J. (1960). English Baronies: A Study of Their Origin and Descent 1086–1327. Oxford, UK: Clarendon Press. p. 101. OCLC 931660.
