= Gundred =

Gundred or Gundreda may refer to:

- Gundred, Countess of Surrey (died 1085)
- Gundreda de Warenne, Countess of Warwick (c. 1120–before 1184)
- Gundred, Countess of Norfolk (died between 1200 and 1206)
