= William de Warenne, 3rd Earl of Surrey =

Anglo-Norman nobleman

William de Warenne
- 3rd Earl of Surrey
- Predecessor: William de Warenne, 2nd Earl of Surrey
- Successor: Isabel de Warenne, 4th Countess of Surrey
- Noble family: Warenne
- Spouse: Adela of Ponthieu, Countess of Surrey
- Issue Detail: Isabel de Warenne, Countess of Surrey
- Father: William de Warenne, 2nd Earl of Surrey
- Mother: Isabel de Vermandois

William de Warenne, 3rd Earl of Surrey (1119 – 6 January 1148) was an Anglo-Norman nobleman, member of the House of Warenne, who fought in England during the Anarchy and generally remained loyal to King Stephen. He participated in, and ultimately perished during, the Second Crusade.

== Origins ==
William was the eldest son of William de Warenne, 2nd Earl of Surrey (died 1138) and his wife Elizabeth de Vermandois. He was a great-grandson of King Henry I of France, and half-brother to Robert de Beaumont, 2nd Earl of Leicester, Waleran IV de Beaumont, Count of Meulan, and Hugh de Beaumont, 1st Earl of Bedford.

== Life ==
Still in his minority in 1137, William was serving with Stephen, King of England, in Normandy, being one of those young nobles who initially fled the battle. Stephen pursued them, held them, and did his best to pacify them, but did not make them fight. At his father's death in 1138, William became the third Earl of Surrey. At Easter 1138, he accompanied his half-brother Waleran de Beaumont, 1st Earl of Worcester on an embassy to Paris for the purpose of ratifying a treaty between the English and French kings. On 2 February 1141, he and his half-brother Waleran were again with King Stephen at the Battle of Lincoln but fled at the initial charge of the enemy forces. They both joined Queen Matilda, but on King Stephen's release, they were once again among his followers, and William witnessed a royal charter at Canterbury in late 1141.

=== Charters ===
With his brother Ralph, William was a joint donor in numerous charters issued by his parents and was a witness to his father's charter, all to Longueville Priory near Rouen, Normandy (between 1130 and 1138). He was also a donor with his brother and both parents to the priory of Bellencombre (also near Rouen) in 1135.

William was also the primary donor in a number of charters after his father died, between 1138 and 1147. One particular instance occurred during a livery of seisin in 1147.

At that event, William gave a large gift to the Lewes Priory which was secured with a lock of hair from his own and from his brother Ralph's head cut by Henry of Blois, Bishop of Winchester, before the altar of the priory church. Lewes Priory had been founded by William's grandparents, William de Warenne, 1st Earl of Surrey, and his wife Gundrada, probably in 1081.

== Marriage and children ==
William married Adela (alias Ela), daughter of Count William III of Ponthieu (also called William Talvas), by his wife Helie, daughter of Odo I, Duke of Burgundy. They had one child and sole heiress, a daughter, Isabel de Warenne, suo jure 4th Countess of Surrey. She married firstly William of Blois (died 1159), the second son of King Stephen, who became Earl Warenne or Earl of Surrey. After he died childless in October 1159, she remarried to Hamelin, half-brother of King Henry II, who became Earl Warenne, or Earl of Surrey. He adopted the surname "de Warenne", and the earldom continued in his descendants.

== Death on crusade ==
William was one of the nobles who, along with his second cousin, King Louis VII of France, took crusading vows at the Council of Vézelay in 1146, and he accompanied the initial army of the Second Crusade the next year. William was killed at the Battle of Mount Cadmus while the crusader army was marching across Anatolia on their way to the Holy Land.

In December 1147, the French-Norman force reached Ephesus. They were joined by remnants of the army of the Holy Roman Empire, which had previously suffered heavy losses at the Battle of Dorylaeum in 1147. They marched across southwest Turkey and fought an unsuccessful battle at Laodicea (3–4 January 1148) on the border between the Byzantine Empire and the Sultanate of Rum.

On 6 January 1148, they battled again in the area of Mount Cadmus, where Turks ambushed the infantry and non-combatants only, because they had become separated from the rest of the army. King Louis VII and his bodyguard of Knights Templars and noblemen recklessly charged the Turks. Most of the knights were killed, including William, and Louis barely escaped with his life. His army arrived later at the coastal city of Adalia. The battle is recorded by Odo of Deuil, personal chaplain to Louis, in his narrative, De Profectione.

== Sources ==
- The battle is recorded by Odo de Deuil, personal chaplain to Louis, in his book De Profectione, pp. 68–127.
- Warren Family History Project
- Farrer, William; Clay, Charles Travis (1949). Early Yorkshire Charters Volume 8: The Honour of Warenne. Cambridge, UK: Cambridge University Press.
- Gransden, Antonia (1992). Legends, Tradition and History in Medieval England. Bloomsbury Publishing.

Peerage of England
Preceded by William de Warenne	Earl of Surrey (1st creation); 1138–1148	Succeeded by Isabel de Warenne
