= Gundreda de Warenne =

Anglo-Norman noblewoman

- Countess of Warwick
- Coat of arms of the Earls of Warwick
- Born: c. 1120
- Died: died before 1184
- Noble family: Warenne
- Spouses: Roger, earl of Warwick; William of Lancaster
- Issue: William, earl of Warwick; Waleran, earl of Warwick; Agnes, married Geoffrey II de Clinton; Gundreda, married Hugh Bigod, earl of Norfolk; Henry of Warwick
- Father: William II, earl Warenne
- Mother: Isabel of Vermandois

Gundreda de Warenne, Countess of Warwick (died before 1184) was an English noblewoman, the wife of Earl Roger (died 1153). She was the daughter and eldest child of William II, earl Warenne by the Capetian princess Isabel of Vermandois (died c. 1140) daughter of Count Hugh the Great of Vermandois and niece of King Philip I of France. On the death of her first husband Count Robert of Meulan and Leicester in 1118 Isabel promptly married Earl William II de Warenne (died 1138) and since Gundreda had an infant daughter by 1138 it is most likely she was the eldest child of the marriage. The Flemish name Gundreda was given her in recollection of her father's mother Gundreda de Warenne (died 1085).

== Marriages ==
Gundreda was married in or around 1136 to Earl Roger, who was 1st cousin of her half-brother, Count Waleran II of Meulan. The marriage tied Earl Roger into the Beaumont clique dominant at the court of Stephen, King of England between 1135 and 1141. For Waleran the marriage helped secure his position in the English west midlands where the king had made him earl of Worcester. In 1138 Gundreda's infant daughter Agnes was similarly employed to settle a local war in Warwickshire by a marriage to Earl Roger's rebel vassal, Geoffrey II de Clinton of Kenilworth, in a deal ironed out by Gundreda's father, Earl William. There are indications that Gundreda was dominant in her husband's council, occupying a leading place in his charters and notoriously forcing his change of side in 1153 to support Henry Plantagenet and abandon King Stephen by conspiring to surrender Warwick Castle to the Angevin party, a manoeuvre that is said to have caused the loyalist Earl Roger's death by a seizure when he heard of it. Gundreda made a second marriage to William of Lancaster, lord of Kendal who died in or soon before 1170. She seems to have returned to Warwickshire after his death.

== Death ==
Gundreda had an appropriately considerable dower out of the estates of the earldom of four large manors in Warwickshire and Rutland. She was still alive when her son Earl William married in 1175 but predeceased him, for her dower manors had reverted to the earldom before William's death in 1184.

== Sources ==
- Cokayne, George E. (1945), The New Complete Peerage, vol. 12, St. Catherine Press Limited
- The Newburgh Earldom of Warwick and its Charters, 1088–1253 ed. David Crouch and Richard Dace (Dugdale Society, 48, 2015).
- Crouch, David "Geoffrey de Clinton and Roger, Earl of Warwick: New Men and Magnates in the Reign of Henry I", Bulletin of the Institute of Historical Research, lv (1982), pp. 113–124.
