= Countess of Surrey =

Countess of Surrey is a title that may be given to a peeress in her own right or to the wife of the Earl of Surrey. Women who have held the title include:

== Countesses in their own right ==
- Isabel de Warenne, Countess of Surrey (c.1137–c.1203)

== Countesses by marriage ==
- Gundred, Countess of Surrey (d. 1085)
- Elizabeth of Vermandois, Countess of Leicester (c.1085–1131)
- Adela of Ponthieu, Countess of Surrey (c.1110–1174)
- Maud Marshal (1192–1248)
- Joan of Bar, Countess of Surrey (d. 1361)
- Elizabeth Tilney, Countess of Surrey (c.1445-1497)
- Agnes Howard, Duchess of Norfolk (c.1477–May 1545)
- Frances de Vere, Countess of Surrey (c. 1517–1577)
