= Waleran de Beaumont =

Waleran de Beaumont may refer to:

- Waleran de Beaumont, 1st Earl of Worcester (1104–1166)
- Galeran V de Beaumont, Count of Meulan (died 1191)
- Waleran de Beaumont, 4th Earl of Warwick (1153–1204)

== See also ==
- House of Beaumont
