= 2nd Earl of Warwick =

2nd Earl of Warwick may refer to:

- Roger de Beaumont, 2nd Earl of Warwick (1102 – 11153)
- John Dudley, 2nd Earl of Warwick (c. 1527 – 1554)
- Robert Rich, 2nd Earl of Warwick (1587 – 1658)
- George Greville, 2nd Earl of Warwick (1746 – 1816)

== See also ==
- Earl of Warwick
