= Château de Bellencombre =

French castle

- Location within Upper Normandy

General information
- Status: Occupied château with adjacent medieval castle ruins
- Type: Château
- Location: Bellencombre, Seine-Maritime, Normandy, France
- Coordinates: 49.70834°N 1.22498°E
- Owner: Warenne family Bellencombre Commune (ruins)

The Château de Bellencombre is a château in the commune of Bellencombre, Seine-Maritime, Normandy, northern France, about 20 miles (32 km) south of Dieppe. It is the ancestral seat of the House of Warenne.

== History ==
Escutcheon of the House of Warenne

=== Medieval château ===
The Château was founded around 1050 by William de Warenne, later the 1st Earl of Warenne and Surrey, as a traditional Norman motte and Bailey castle.

After the Norman Conquest, Bellencombre remained the seat of the Earl of Warenne’s Norman estates, until the separation of England and Normandy in 1204. The estate then passed through a series of owners, and suffered a number of sieges. After the final siege in 1472 by Charles the Bold, the chateau was abandoned. An inscribed slab in the local parish church however shows that the governorship of the castle continued to exist as late as 1519.

Following its abandonment, the medieval castle fell into ruin. In 1834, the remains were partially dismantled and sold as building materials.

=== 17th century château ===
In the 1640s, during the English Civil War, the Warenne family returned to Bellencombre and acquired land near the ruins of the medieval château, where they constructed a residence. Following the restoration of King Charles II of England, the family returned to England, although they retained the property.

The house was extensively altered and largely rebuilt during the 18th and 19th centuries.

=== Present day ===
In 2017, the Association de Sauvegarde du Château de Bellencombre (Association for the Preservation of the Château de Bellencombre), or A.S.C.B., was formed to preserve the remaining ruins. The association works in partnership with the Commune of Bellencombre, which owns most of the ruin site, and the Warenne family, who own the wider estate encompassing the ruins.

The Château de Bellencombre remains one of the principal residences of the Warenne family, and the family are reported to occupy the house during the summer months, and participate in local community events.
