= Waleran de Beaumont, 4th Earl of Warwick =

English Earl

Waleran de Newburgh or Beaumont
- 4th Earl of Warwick
- Coat of arms of the Earls of Warwick
- Died: 24 December 1204
- Noble family: Newburgh or Beaumont
- Spouses: Margaret de Bohun; Alice de Harcourt
- Issue: Henry de Beaumont, 5th Earl of Warwick; Gundreda of Warwick; Waleran of Warwick; Alice of Warwick; William fitz Count (illegitimate)
- Father: Earl Roger of Warwick
- Mother: Gundreda de Warenne, countess of Warwick

Waleran de Beaumont, 4th Earl of Warwick (died 12 December 1204) was the second son of Earl Roger of Warwick and Gundreda de Warenne, daughter of William de Warenne, 2nd Earl of Surrey and Elizabeth de Vermandois. He was known in his elder brother's time as 'Waleran of Warwick' marking the shift of surname in the family in his generation. The surnames 'Beaumont' and 'Newburgh' were used by the first two generations of the family, and are applied to the later generations by convention.

== Early life ==
Waleran was named after his father's first cousin and political ally Count Waleran II of Meulan which indicates that he was born between 1137 and 1141 when Count Waleran was politically dominant at the court of King Stephen of England. Waleran served as household knight to his elder brother Earl William and appears to have inherited the manors of Greetham and Cottesmore in Rutland from their father.

== Earl of Warwick ==
Waleran was rather more successful politically than his elder brother, who died childless in 1184 and left him an unwelcome inheritance of debt and depleted estates. Nonetheless, Waleran achieved some influence at the Angevin court, bearing a Sword of State at the coronations of King Richard and of King John. He was able to regain the traditional payment of the third penny of the profits of Warwickshire from King Richard, which his brother had lost. He was one of the principal loyalists to the king during John's rebellion against the justiciars in 1193-94. Another way Waleran may have tried to retrieve the family fortunes was by commencing the sell off to local gentry of large swathes of the forest of Sutton, which at the time made up much of the north of Warwickshire.

Waleran is said to have been a generous patron of the hospital of St Michael's Hospital, Warwick and otherwise made grants and confirmations to several monastic houses. He made a notable grant of revenues to the nuns of Pinley at Claverdon on their reception of his daughter Gundreda and niece Isabel for their upbringing and education there.

== Earl Waleran and Guy of Warwick ==
Waleran achieved a very respectable marriage for his eldest son, Henry who in 1204, the last year of the earl's life, married Margaret daughter and eventual co-heir of Henry d'Oilly of Hook Norton, one of the leading barons of Oxfordshire. This has been suggested to have been the occasion for the commissioning of the romance Guy of Warwick whose legendary hero was an Oxfordshire baron of Anglo-Saxon days who married the heiress of Warwick. Guy was later associated with the hermitage of Gybclyf or Guy's Cliffe which Earl Waleran granted to his priory of Holy Sepulchre in Warwick.

== Descent of the Earldom ==
Waleran married twice and with his wives had four legitimate children who survived to adulthood. As well as these there is evidence that before he married he had an illegitimate son, William. By his first wife Margaret daughter of Humphrey III de Bohun he had Henry as son and heir to the earldom, and probably also Gundreda, confided as a child to the nuns of Pinley. This line ended with his granddaughter Countess Margaret. Waleran married secondly Alice, daughter of Robert de Harcourt. She survived him, dying probably in 1226. They had two known children. There was a son, Waleran of Warwick, who succeeded to the manors of Greetham and Cottesmore at the earl's death in 1204, but died childless. It was from their daughter Alice that the claim to the earldom of Warwick came ultimately to the Beauchamp family of Elmley.

== Sources ==
- Cokayne, George E. (1945), The New Complete Peerage, vol. 12, St. Catherine Press Limited
- The Newburgh Earldom of Warwick and its Charters, 1088-1253 ed. David Crouch and Richard Dace (Dugdale Society, 48, 2015).
- Crouch, David 'The Local Influence of the Earls of Warwick, 1088-1242,' Midland History, 21 (1996), 1-22.
- Mason, Emma, 'The Resources of the Earldom of Warwick in the Thirteenth Century,' Midland History 3 (1975/6), 67-76.
- Mason, Emma, 'Legends of the Beauchamps' Ancestors', Journal of Medieval History, 10 (1984), 25-40.

Peerage of England
Preceded by William de Beaumont	Earl of Warwick; 1184–1204	Succeeded by Henry de Beaumont
