= Haddington Priory =

Priory in East Lothian, Scotland

Monastery information
- Other names: St Mary's Nunnery, Haddington; Abbey of St Mary, Haddington
- Order: Cistercian
- Established: c. 1158
- Dedication: St Mary

People
- Founder: Ada de Warenne

Site
- Location: Haddington, East Lothian, Scotland

Haddington Priory, was a medieval Cistercian nunnery located about one mile east of Haddington in East Lothian, Scotland. Founded between 1152 and 1159 by Ada de Warenne, Countess of Northumbria and Huntingdon, the priory lasted until the 16th century, declining and demolished after the Scottish Reformation.

== History ==
Founded circa 1158 by Ada de Warenne, Countess of Northumbria and Huntingdon and widow of Prince Henry of Scotland.

The nunnery suffered repeated slighting during Anglo-Scottish conflicts and hosted the July 1548 meeting of the Parliament of Scotland that agreed to the Treaty of Haddington. Following the Scottish Reformation, the monastic buildings were largely dismantled and incorporated into the neighbouring farm of Abbeymill.

The site is protected as a scheduled monument.

== List of known prioresses ==
- Alicia (fl. 1292).
- Eva (fl. 1296).
- Mariota Douglas (fl. 1443).
- Janet Hepburn (fl. 1501).
- Elizabeth Hepburn (fl. 1548).
- Isobel Hepburn (fl. 1563).

== See also ==
- List of monastic houses in Scotland
- St Mary's Collegiate Church, Haddington
- Sancta Maria Abbey, Nunraw
