= Lewes Priory =

Grade I listed ruins in the United Kingdom

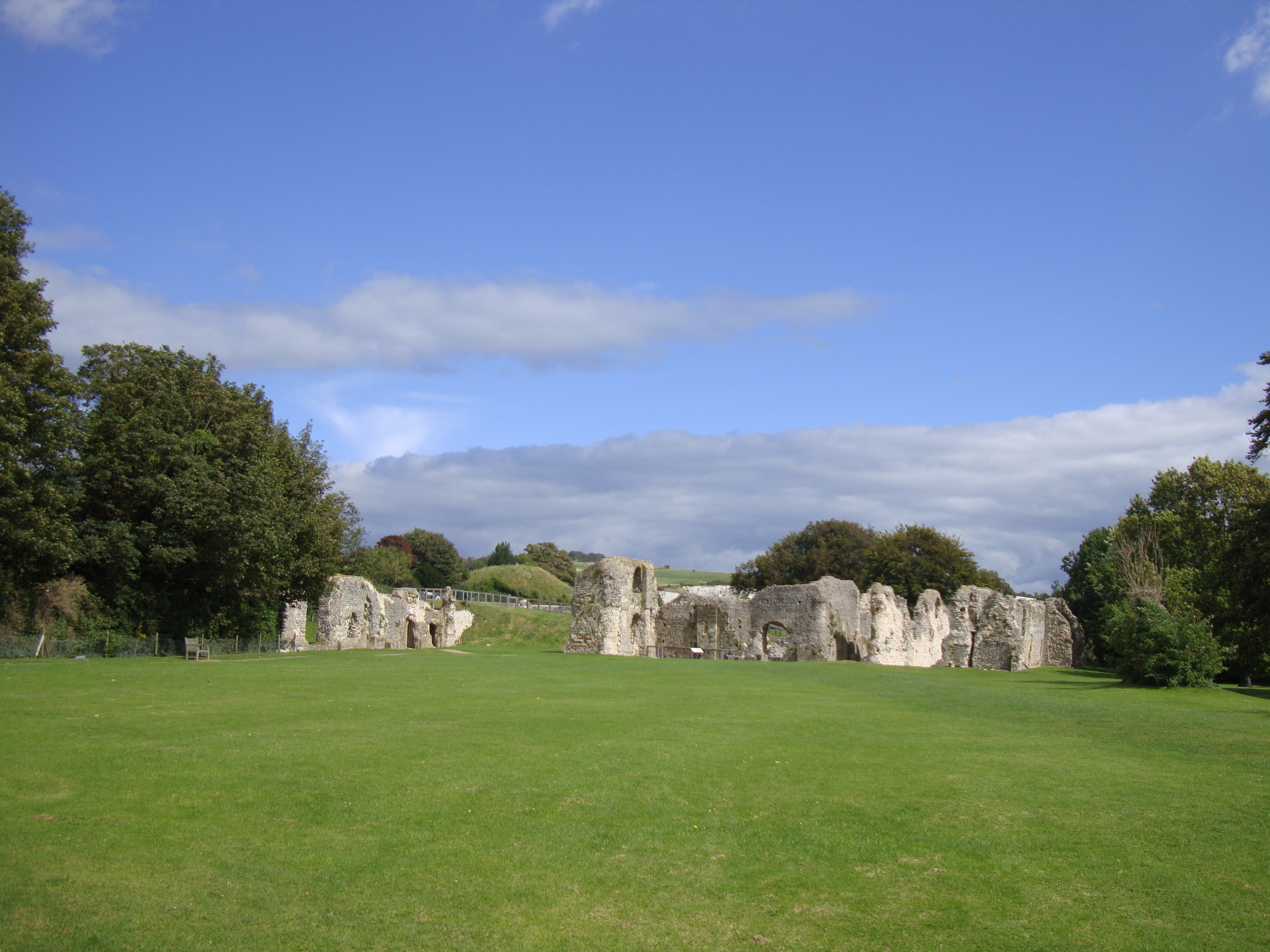
- View of priory remains, in the direction of the site of the Great Church (now bisected by railway line)
- Interactive map of Lewes Priory

Monastery information
- Full name: The Priory of St Pancras, Southover near Lewes
- Other name: Lewes Priory
- Order: Cluniac
- Established: circa 1081
- Disestablished: 16 November 1537
- Mother house: Cluny
- Dedication: St Pancras of Rome
- Controlled churches: St. John the Evangelist, Piddinghoe, St. Nicholas. Iford.

People
- Founders: William de Warenne, Earl of Surrey and Gundrada

Site
- Location: Southover, East Sussex, United Kingdom
- Coordinates: 50°52′5.33″N 0°0′29.63″E
- Visible remains: limited above ground: part precinct wall, hospitium, dorter, rere dorter, first church
- Public access: yes, free all year round

Lewes Priory is a part-demolished medieval Cluniac priory in Lewes, East Sussex in the United Kingdom. The ruins have been designated a Grade I listed building.

== History ==
The Priory of St Pancras was the first Cluniac house in England and had one of the largest monastic churches in the country. It was set within an extensive walled and gated precinct laid out in a commanding location fronting the tidal shore-line at the head of the Ouse valley to the south of Lewes in the County of Sussex. The Priory had daughter houses, including Castle Acre Priory in Norfolk, and was endowed with churches and extensive holdings throughout England. In Lewes it had hospitiums dedicated to St James and to St Nicholas.

In 1264, during the Battle of Lewes, King Henry III retreated with his forces to the Priory precinct which then came under attack from those of Simon de Montfort after his victory over Henry's army in battle. Henry was forced, in the Mise of Lewes, to accept the Council that was the start of Parliamentary government in England.

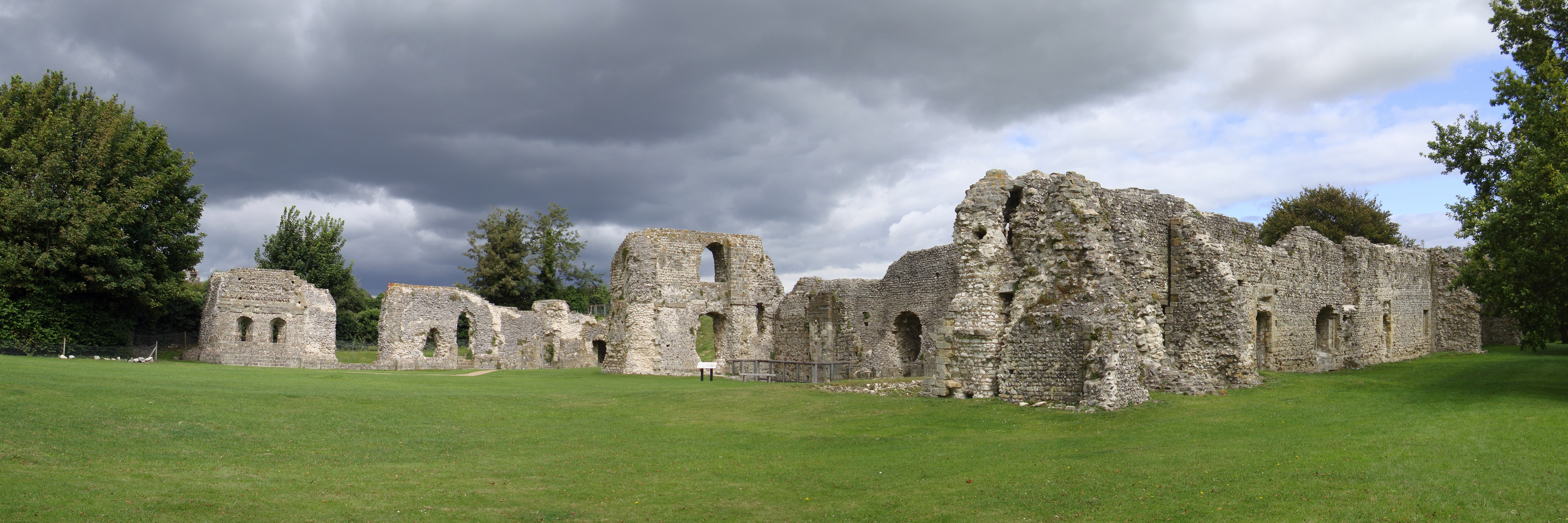
Panorama of the remains of the priory

The Lewes Priory Trust currently manages the site on behalf of Lewes Town Council who are the freeholder. The Priory is a nationally important historical site but an almost lost monument of mediaeval England, the buildings having been systematically demolished after the dissolution of the monasteries in the reign of Henry VIII. Some parts of the lesser buildings survive above ground, fenced off within a public park. The Priory has been the subject of academic and archaeological study since the mid-nineteenth century and a Heritage Lottery Fund grant in 2009 enabled repair of the surviving fabric, full public access and the provision of information panels interpreting the site and its history.

== Foundation ==
Lewes Priory was founded by William de Warenne, 1st Earl of Surrey and his wife Gundrada, probably in 1081, following their visit to the Priory of Cluny in Burgundy in 1077. The dedication of the new Priory to St Pancras followed from the presence of a pre-existing Saxon shrine to that saint on the site. The cult of St Pancras was a strong link between Saxon England and Rome, having been introduced by Augustine in 597 at the behest of Gregory the Great. William de Warenne was acting under the auspices of a Cluniac Pope, Gregory VII. The ambition of the new work and piety of the new order was intended to legitimise and assert the post-conquest regime in England.

== Site ==
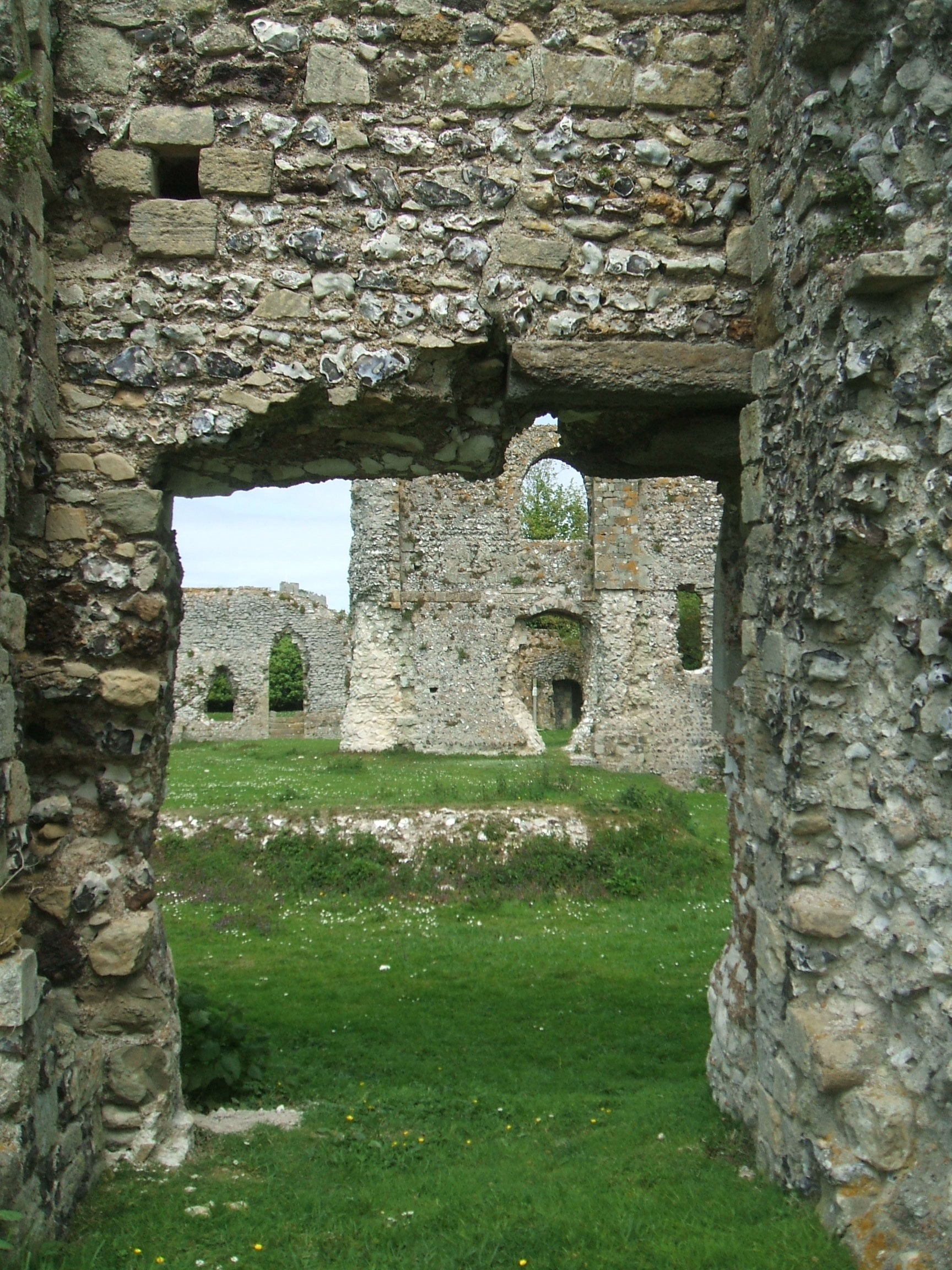
A cross view of the existing ruins

Existing topographical and built features delineate the Priory precinct. The precinct comprises a rough quadrilateral of land about 16.1 hectares in area, 520 metres in width, west to east, and 310 metres north to south bounded along the north side by today's Southover High Street and Priory Street. This precinct was comparable in extent to the walled town of Lewes sited on the ridge to the north.

The original context and relationship of the precinct to the natural topography is now far from clear because the tidal valley of the River Ouse to the south has been drained. In the mediaeval period the south side of the precinct addressed the Cockshut Stream and from there a navigable, tidal watercourse connecting to the River Ouse and, hence, the English Channel. The site can properly be understood as a coastal location and was fully enclosed by high flint walls, being vulnerable to sea-borne attack. The Priory buildings were constructed in the western half, the major church and sacred buildings being in the north-west quadrant. The precinct was terraced in section, stepping down to the south with the buildings set at different levels.

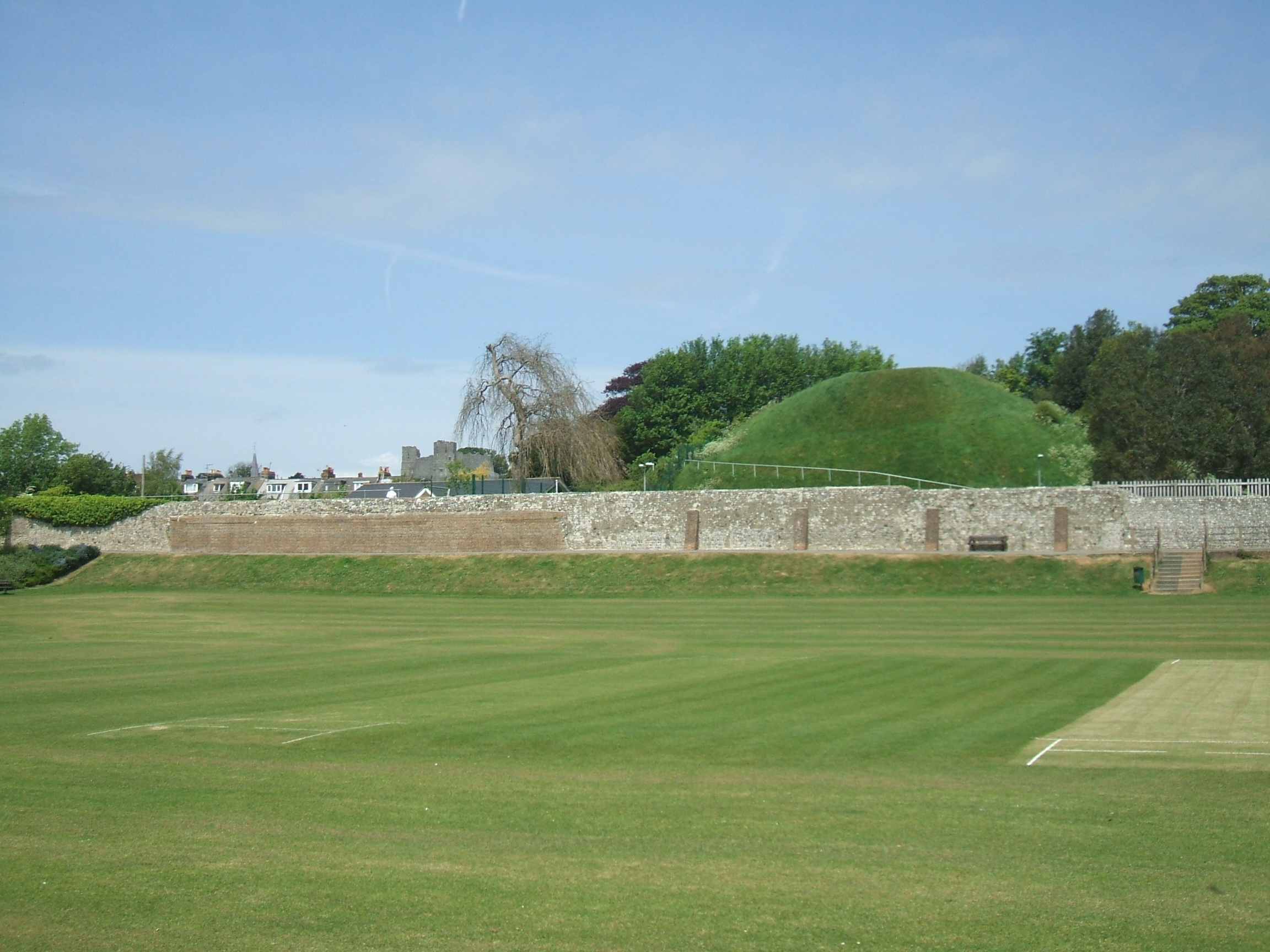
The Mount and south-facing wall.

The north-east quadrant has an embankment and wall enclosing its southern side that is of mediaeval date with semicircular buttresses along its eastern extent. This southern wall is a remarkable feature of a defensive, military character. This quadrant is a triple square on plan, the eastern half centres on the conical 'Mount', 46m (150 feet) in diameter and 15m (50 feet) high that is aligned on a sunken field to its east with banks on all sides known as the 'Dripping Pan'. The ages and original functions of these two man-made features are not certain: they appear to have been built by the Priory and may have been constructed as a salt works on an earlier enclosed. elevated plot. If of mediaeval date or earlier, the Mount would certainly have provided an observatory over the Ouse basin, of defensive importance, and a beacon to shipping navigating across it.

== Buildings ==
Modern understanding of the layout and development of the Priory derives largely from archaeological excavations carried out since the 1840s, most extensively by George Somers Clarke. The accepted plan of the Priory was drawn by archaeologist and antiquary Sir William Henry St. John Hope and architect Sir Harold Brakspear in 1906 based upon archaeology, documented accounts and hypothesis. Aspects of this have been better explored by later research and excavation. The structural bay division shown of the nave is probably wrong, being elongated in a way inconsistent with Romanesque planning modules and different from that of the choir, the Lady Chapel is missing and certain lay buildings are also not shown. This is, nonetheless, the best guide available and a potent diagram.

The buildings accommodated an establishment of around 50 monks at any one time throughout the 12th and 13th centuries as well as lay incumbents and visitors. The precinct buildings were built for sacred and temporal functions and were of ashlar stone faced chalk and flint core construction. Quarr limestone shipped from the Saxon quarries on the Isle of Wight was used in the first phase of construction. Caen limestone, imported from Normandy was used with Sussex marble details for the second phase including the construction of the great church. The Priory had its own masons' yard, it manufactured decorated glazed floor tiles and had a school of sacred painting that worked throughout Sussex. The calibre of surviving figurative carvings that are displayed at the British Museum is of a highly sophisticated order.

=== Great Church of St Pancras ===
The first Cluniac Priory church was a reconstruction in stone of a Saxon timber church. This may correspond to the single cell structure of which the lower sections of wall and the altar survive, now known as the Infirmary Chapel. This is orientated to a different liturgical east from the major church (which is 5.5 degrees closer to current magnetic east) but the same orientation as that of St Michael, Lewes, also a Saxon foundation and of St John, Southover. By the twelfth century it had become the practice to orient a church to face the rising sun on the day of the saint in whose name the church was dedicated, in this case, 12 May, to which orientation the major church appears to have been aligned. The major church was constructed after 1140 AD with the west towers recorded as unfinished in 1268 AD. Of this work nothing survives above ground level. The design of the church was based upon that of its mother church at Cluny, then the largest church in the world, now referred to as Cluny III. Comparison with the surviving Romanesque fabric of the daughter Priory of Castle Acre is relevant. The church had an internal length of 128m (420 feet) from west door to chancel apse, with an internal vault height of 28m (93 feet) at the altar and 32m (105 feet) at the crossing. This was the largest church in Sussex, being longer than Chichester Cathedral including its Lady Chapel, and is comparable in scale to the original form of Ely Cathedral or the surviving form of Lichfield Cathedral.

=== Priory buildings ===
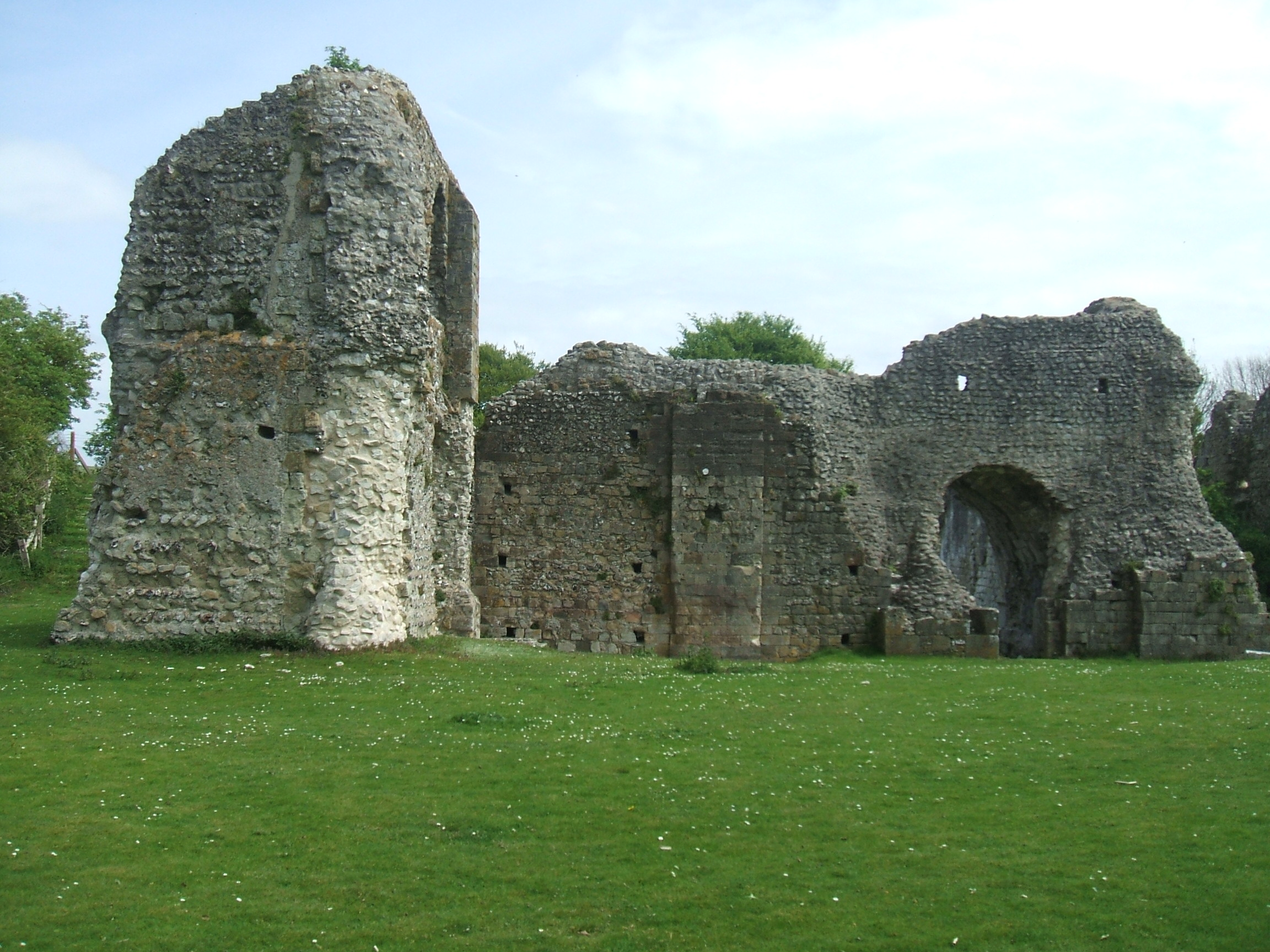
The reredorter.

These comprised the cloister and chapter house directly south of the church and the dorter, reredorter, frater and infirmary to south and east, of which sections survive above ground, as well as the Prior's lodging and entrance gates to the west of which fragments also survive. The dove house to the south-west was a large building that survived until the early nineteenth century. It is reasonable to assume a pattern of bakeries, fish ponds and other food production and storage buildings in this area of a type and layout identified at Castle Acre and other English Cluniac houses. Subterranean cisterns and drainage courses as well as fresh water conduits have been identified by excavation.

=== Hospitium, now St John the Baptist, Southover ===
The original hospitium is now used as the local parish church. The twelfth-century nave arcade, with short drum piers and un-moulded arches perhaps divided the men's from the women's ward. The neo-Norman south chapel of 1847 houses the bones of William and Gundrada de Warenne which were unearthed in two lead cists by railway navvies constructing the Brighton to Lewes railway through the site of the Priory chapter house in 1845. On the floor of the chapel lies the original black Tournai marble tombstone from the Priory carved to the memory of Gundrada that had been incorporated into a Tudor period memorial in the church of St Margaret, Isfield.

=== Precinct walls ===
The most extensive surviving mediaeval structures are the precinct walls along the north (140 metres) and east (170 metres) sides of the Dripping Pan. Lengths also survive down Cockshut Road bounding the west side of the precinct. Significant secondary walls within the great precinct sub divide the land, notably the south wall of the Dripping Pan. The precinct walls have otherwise generally been removed for housing development, the railway and a car park near the Mount. Fragments of the Great Gate (circa. 1200 AD) exist in a rearranged form adjacent to the east end of St John's Church. The destruction of the walls has continued in recent years following the grant of Planning Permission by Lewes District Council to Lewes Football Club to demolish a section of the longest surviving extent of the structure along Ham Lane in 2006 for unrealised business objectives whilst a further adjacent length subsequently delaminated and fell in 2008 with repairs started in late 2009.

== Dissolution and destruction ==
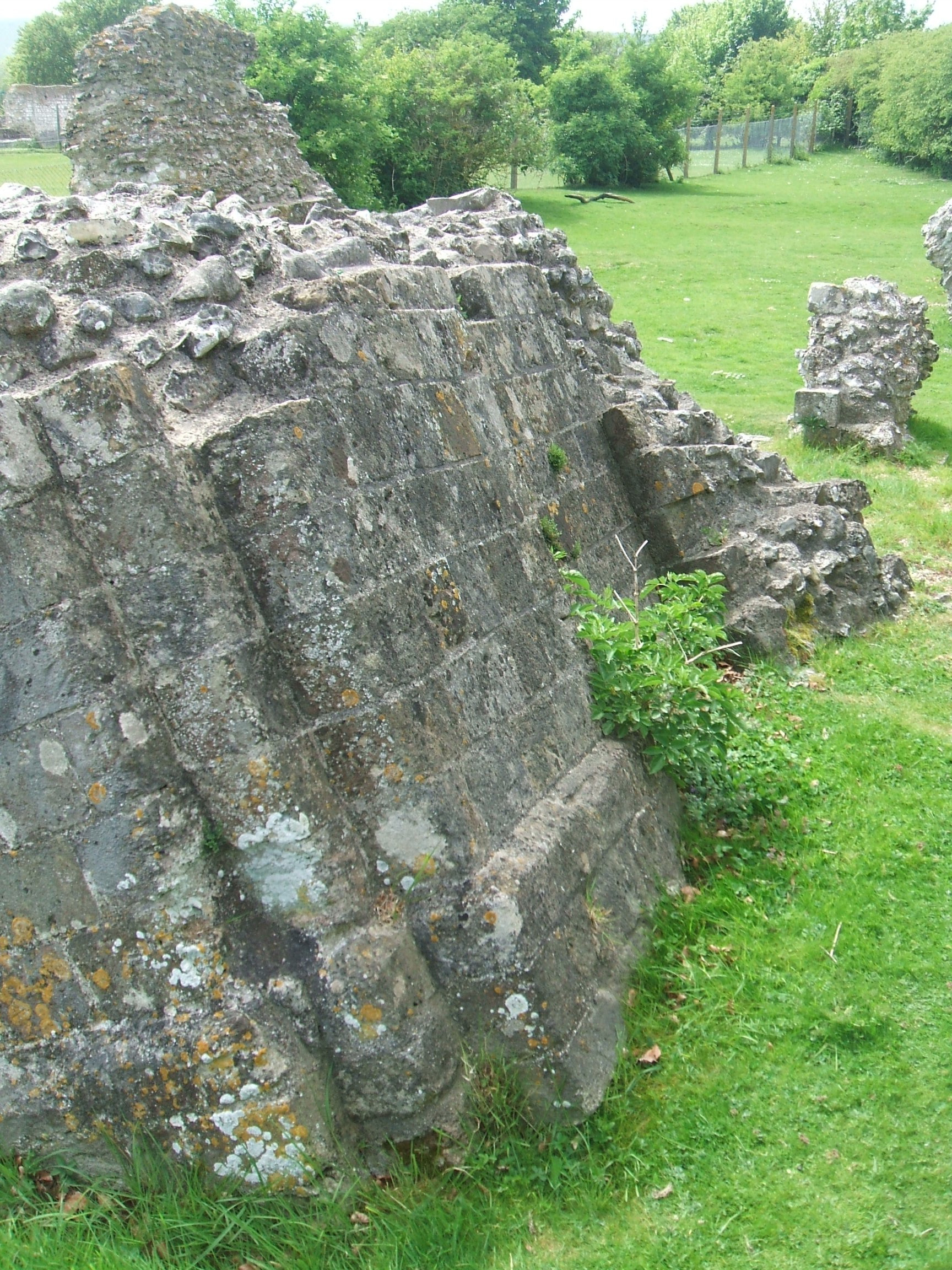
The partly undermined remains of the infirmary chapel.

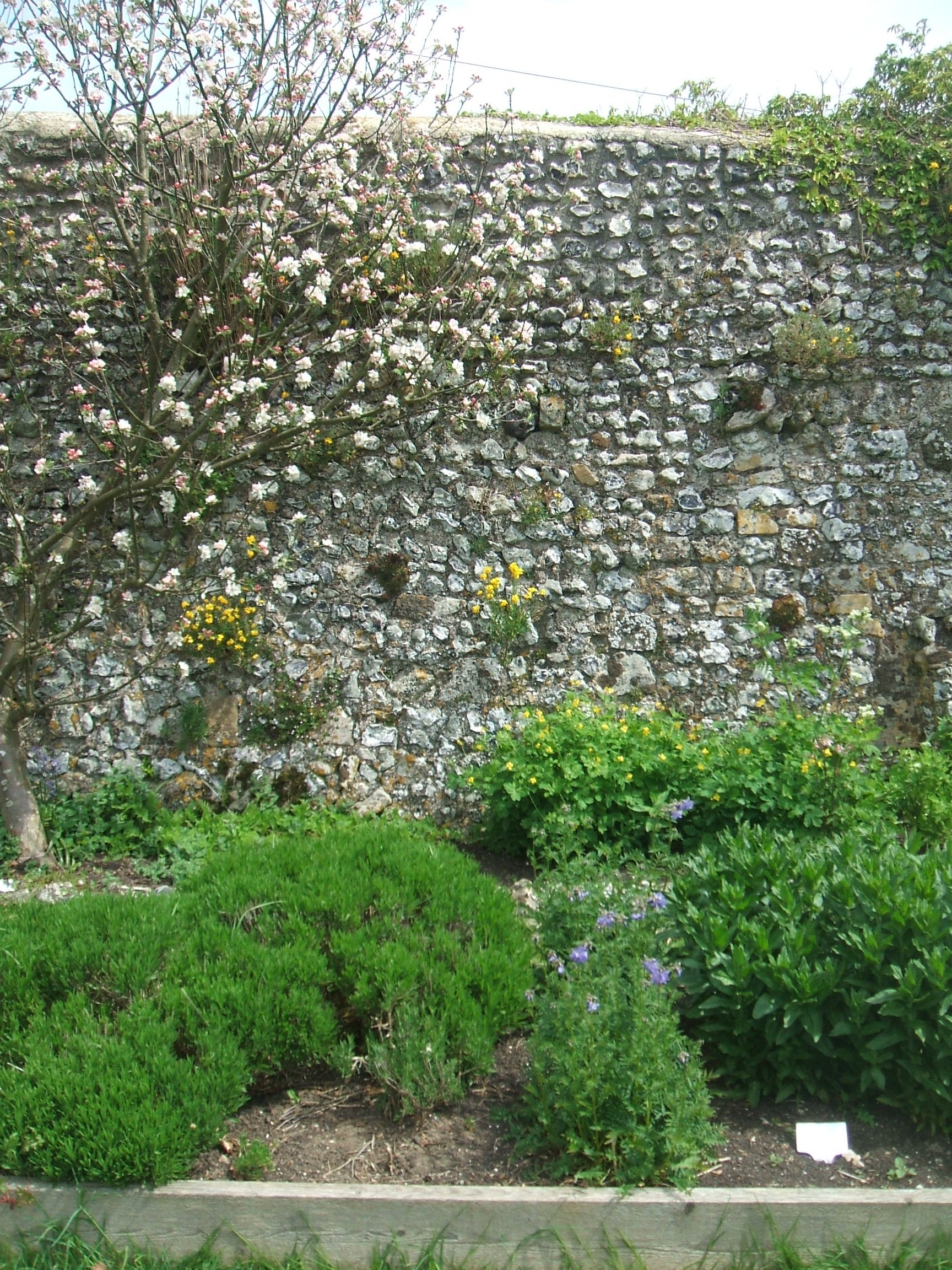
The apple tree, herb beds and east minor precinct wall.

The priory was surrendered to the Crown on 16 November 1537 and its destruction carried out at the direction of the King's secretary, Thomas Cromwell. Cromwell appointed a specialist demolition team under an Italian engineer, Giovanni Portinari, who recorded the task and undertook it with exceptional thoroughness. In 1538 the manor of Southover and the site of the dissolved monastery were granted to Thomas Cromwell. Cromwell built a substantial house on the site of the prior's lodgings that was known as "the Lord's Place". After Thomas Cromwell's fall from grace the manor was given to Anne of Cleves. Following her death it reverted to the Crown. It was subsequently owned by the Sackville family. The site of the dissolved priory was leased in 1539 for 21 years by Thomas Cromwell to Nicholas Jenney, and this lease was confirmed in 1540, after Cromwell's fall, by Henry VIII. The site was subsequently owned by the Earls of Dorset.

After 1830, residential development took place to the east of St John's Church along the northern side of the precinct. This construction cut into the Priory burial grounds, most significantly Regency Priory Crescent (originally known as "New Crescent"). Despite its grand façade, this collection of houses is somewhat random at the back with a wide range of rear elevations. The individual gardens of Priory Crescent end at a private lane to the south which is linked to the original path connecting the Gatehouse to the Priory. This Gatehouse was rotated 90 degrees and moved just a few metres from its original location in order to widen the road. The current gate is the smaller arch that pedestrians would have walked through, rather than the larger one (used for traffic such as horses and carts). The builders sold the human bones, teeth and skulls that they excavated whilst digging foundations. Priory Street was built in several stages with Mount Street projected southwards into the Priory precinct.

In 1845, the Brighton, Lewes and Hastings Railway (subsequently the London Brighton and South Coast Railway) drove their new line through the site, digging down to a track bed level to meet the new Lewes railway station, and constructing a line of railway cottages at the east end of Priory Street. This line bisected the foundations of the chapter house and church apse exposing the foundations and burials including those of William de Warenne and Gundrada. The destruction and collateral damage to the Priory remains was significant and the site was split in two but the construction triggered archaeological investigation. Elements of the fabric and finds are held by the Sussex Archaeological Society in their two Lewes museums and by the British Museum.

== Present situation ==
The Priory site to the north of the railway line is in private ownership, formerly occupied by a walled nursery and before that, public gardens, all recently cleared. The standing ruins to the south are separated from the northern site by the railway. The site of Lewes Priory south of the railway line is a public park. It is open throughout the year and entrance is free of charge.

Despite the disruption caused by the construction of the railway across the site, a substantial protected ruin still stands within parkland, albeit only a small proportion of the original priory building fabric. In the nineteenth and early twentieth centuries, the ruins were subject of research and conservation and a popular visitor attraction. The Priory reopened in 2011 after a two-year restoration project that improved access and interpretation of the medieval monastery. Some fencing was removed and pathways, benches and interpretive signs were installed. There are interpretative panels and a guide book.

In the park there are two neo-medieval buildings, a folly tower and a cottage, made from the stone of the Priory, which were built in the gardens of the former Lords Place. A large metal sculpture of a knight's helm (1964) commemorates the Battle of Lewes. The herb garden was recreated by local historians with medicinal plants that would likely have been in the original. The Apple Orchard has six rare old Sussex varieties.

There was once a minigolf course laid out over the challenging slopes of the infirmary, but this, and the public tennis courts, have been closed by the local authority. Much of the Priory precinct is given over to recreation and sports including Lewes Football Club at the Dripping Pan stadium, the Lewes Bowls Club and the Southdowns Sports Club. The Lewes Priory Cricket Club, formerly at the Dripping Pan, now play at the Stanley Turner Ground, nearby.

A small modern development of relatively simple and attractive housing protrudes east out of Cockshut Road into the precinct. The easternmost of these dwellings overlooks the rear graveyard of St. John's Church, a secluded patch of land including a barn on the site of the original Prior's lodging.

Ashlar stone from the Priory has been used in many later buildings and walls in Lewes, including Southover Grange and gardens and can be identified on walks around the town. Lewes Priory School, nearby, commemorates this ancient foundation.

== Burials ==
- William de Warenne, 1st Earl of Surrey, at the Chapterhouse
- Gundred, Countess of Surrey, with her husband at the Chapterhouse
- Hamelin de Warenne, Earl of Surrey also in the Chapterhouse
- Eleanor Maltravers
- John FitzAlan, 1st Baron Arundel
- Richard FitzAlan, 10th Earl of Arundel
- Eleanor of Lancaster
- Elizabeth de Bohun
- William de Warenne, 2nd Earl of Surrey
- Elizabeth of Vermandois, Countess of Leicester
- John de Warenne, 6th Earl of Surrey
- John de Warenne, 7th Earl of Surrey
- George Nevill, 4th Baron Bergavenny

== Music ==
Music composed for the Priory has been found in a book called the Lewes Breviary, found in France and in the possession of the Fitzwilliam Museum.

== See also ==
- List of monastic houses in East Sussex
- List of monastic houses in England
