= Elizabeth of Vermandois, Countess of Leicester =

French-born English countess (c. 1085–1131)

Elizabeth of Vermandois
- Born: c. 1085
- Died: 13 February 1131
- Noble family: House of Capet
- Spouses: Robert de Beaumont, 1st Earl of Leicester; William de Warenne, 2nd Earl of Surrey
- Issue: With Robert; Robert de Beaumont, 2nd Earl of Leicester; Waleran de Beaumont, 1st Earl of Worcester; Hugh de Beaumont, 1st Earl of Bedford; Emma de Beaumont; Adeline de Beaumont; Aubree de Beaumont; Maud de Beaumont; Isabel de Beaumont; With William; William de Warenne, 3rd Earl of Surrey; Ralph de Warenne; Reginald de Warenne; Gundreda de Warenne; Ada de Warenne
- Father: Hugh I, Count of Vermandois
- Mother: Adelaide, Countess of Vermandois

Elizabeth of Vermandois (c. 1085 – 1131) (or Isabel) was a French noblewoman, who by her two marriages was the mother of the 1st Earl of Worcester, the 2nd Earl of Leicester, the 3rd Earl of Surrey, and of Gundred de Warenne, mother of the 4th Earl of Warwick.

It is believed that Elizabeth was the source of the famous chequered shield of gold and blue (or and azure) adopted at the dawn of the age of heraldry (in England circa 1200–1215) by her brother and originating before the middle of the 12th century, as did only two other groups of allied English shields, the Mandeville-de Vere "quarterly shields" and the de Clare "chevron shields".

== Origins ==
Elizabeth was the third daughter of Hugh I of Vermandois and Adelaide of Vermandois.

== First marriage ==
Chequy or and azure, the famous proto-heraldic coat of arms of Elizabeth of Vermandois (possibly first adopted by her brother Ralph, Count of Vermandois, as shown on his seal), which she transmitted in differenced forms to her offspring

Elizabeth was the wife successively of two Anglo-Norman magnates, firstly of Robert de Beaumont, 1st Earl of Leicester, Count of Meulan, by whom she had twin sons, and secondly of William de Warenne, 2nd Earl of Surrey, by whom she had a further son and a daughter Gundred de Warenne.

In 1096 Robert de Beaumont, 1st Earl of Leicester (d. 1118) reputed to be the "wisest man in his time between London and Jerusalem" insisted, in defiance of the laws of the Church, on marrying the very young Elizabeth, he being over fifty at the time. In early 1096 Bishop Ivo (Perhaps Ivo of Chartres), on hearing of the proposed marriage, wrote a letter forbidding the marriage and preventing its celebration on the grounds of consanguinuity, i.e. that the two were related within prohibited degrees.

In April 1096 Elizabeth's father was able to convince Pope Urban II to issue a dispensation for the marriage, and departed on the Crusade preached by that pope, his last act being to see his daughter married to Robert.

Robert was a nobleman of some significance in France, having inherited lands from his maternal uncle Henry, Count of Meulan. He gained renown fighting in his first battle, in command of the right wing, at the Battle of Hastings as one of the proven companions of William the Conqueror. He was rewarded with ninety manors in the counties of Leicestershire, Northamptonshire, Warwickshire and Wiltshire. The count of Meulan was one of Henry I's "four wise counsellors and was one of the king's commanders at the Battle of Tinchebray" 28 September 1106. In 1107 Robert became Earl of Leicester.

By de Beaumont Elizabeth had three sons (the eldest of whom were twins) and five or six daughters as follows:

- Robert de Beaumont, 2nd Earl of Leicester (born 1104, twin), married and left issue.
- Waleran de Beaumont, 1st Earl of Worcester, Count of Meulan (born 1104, twin), married and left issue.
- Hugh de Beaumont, 1st Earl of Bedford (born c. 1106), lost his earldom, left issue.
- Emma de Beaumont (born 1102), betrothed as an infant to Aumari de Montfort, nephew of William, Count of Évreux, but the marriage never took place. She probably died young, or entered a convent.
- Adeline de Beaumont (b c. 1107), who married, firstly, Hugh IV, 4th Lord of Montfort-sur-Risle, and, secondly, Richard de Granville (d. 1147), lord of the manor of Bideford in Devon.
- Aubree de Beaumont (b c. 1109) (or Alberee), who married Hugh II of Châteauneuf-en-Thimerais.
- Maud de Beaumont (b c. 1111), who married William Lovel.
- Isabel de Beaumont (b Aft. 1102), a mistress of King Henry I of England. She first married Gilbert de Clare, 1st Earl of Pembroke, and later married Hervé de Montmorency, Constable of Ireland.

== Second marriage ==
Elizabeth married William de Warenne, 2nd Earl of Surrey soon after the death of her first husband in 1118.

William had sought a royal bride in 1093, but failed in his attempt to wed Matilda of Scotland (also known as Edith), who later married King Henry I.

The historian James Planché claimed in 1874 that Elizabeth was seduced by or fell in love with William before Robert's death, resulting in an affair. However, the evidence for any affair is lacking. Elizabeth survived her second husband.

By William de Warenne, Elizabeth had three sons and two daughters:

- William de Warenne, 3rd Earl of Surrey (1119–1148), eldest son and heir;
- Ralph de Warenne
- Reginald de Warenne, who inherited his father's lands in Upper Normandy, including the castles of Bellencombre and Mortemer. He married Alice de Wormegay, daughter of William de Wormegay, Lord of Wormegay in Norfolk, by whom he had a son: William de Warenne, founder of Wormegay Priory.
- Gundred de Warenne (or Gundrada), who married, firstly, Roger de Beaumont, 2nd Earl of Warwick (c. 1102 – 1153) (the nephew of her mother's first husband) and had issue, including William de Beaumont, 3rd Earl of Warwick (c. 1140 – 1184); secondly, she married William de Lancaster, feudal baron of Kendal in Westmorland, and had issue.
- Ada de Warenne (d. ca. 1178), who married Henry of Scotland, 3rd Earl of Huntingdon, younger son of King David I of Scotland, and had issue. She is known as the "Queen mother of Scotland" for her two sons, Malcolm IV, King of Scotland and William I 'the Lion', King of Scotland, as well as being the ancestor of numerous other Scottish kings.

== Sources ==
- Tanner, Heather (2004). Families, Friends and Allies: Boulogne and Politics in Northern France and England, C.879–1160. Brill.
