= Ada de Warenne =

Mother of Scottish kings Malcolm IV and William I

- Born: c. 1120
- Died: 1178
- Noble family: Warenne
- Spouse: Henry of Scotland (m. 1139; died 1152)
- Issue: Malcolm IV the Maiden; William I the Lion; Margaret, Duchess of Brittany; David, 8th Earl of Huntingdon; Ada, Countess of Holland; Marjorie, Countess of Angus
- Father: William de Warenne, 2nd Earl of Surrey
- Mother: Elizabeth of Vermandois

Ada de Warenne (or Adeline de Varenne) (c. 1120 – 1178) was the Anglo-Norman wife of Henry of Scotland, Earl of Northumbria and Earl of Huntingdon. She was the daughter of William de Warenne, 2nd Earl of Surrey by Elizabeth of Vermandois, and a great-granddaughter of Henry I of France. She was the mother of Malcolm IV and William I of Scotland.

== Life ==
Ada and Henry were married in England in 1139.

As part of her marriage settlement, Ada was granted the privileges of Haddington, amongst others in East Lothian. Previously the seat of a thanage, Haddington is said to be the first royal burgh in Scotland, created by Ada's father-in-law, David I of Scotland, who held it along with the church and a mill.

In close succession, both her husband and King David died in 1152 and 1153, respectively. Following the death of Henry, who was buried at Kelso Abbey, King David arranged for his grandson to succeed him, and at Scone on 27 May 1153, the twelve-year-old was declared Malcolm IV, King of Scots. Following his coronation, Malcolm installed his brother William as Earl of Northumbria (although this county was "restored" to King Henry II of England by Malcolm in 1157), and Ada retired to her lands at Haddington.

On Thursday 9 December 1165 King Malcolm died at the age of 24 without issue. His mother had at that time been attempting to arrange a marriage between him and Constance, daughter of Conan III, Duke of Brittany, but Malcolm died before the wedding could be celebrated.

Following his brother's death, Ada's younger son William became King of Scots at the age of twenty-three. William the Lion was to become the longest-serving King of Scots to that date, serving until 1214.

=== Church patronage ===
Religious houses were established in Haddington at an early date. They came to include the Blackfriars (who came into Scotland in 1219) and most notably the Church of the Greyfriars, or Minorites (came into Scotland in the reign of Alexander II), which would become famous as "Lucerna Laudoniae"—The Lamp of Lothian, the toft of land upon which it stands being granted by King David I of Scotland to the Prior of St. Andrews (to whom the patronage of the church of Haddington belonged). David I also granted to the monks of Dunfermline "unam mansuram" in Haddington, as well as to the monks of Haddington a full toft "in burgo meo de Hadintun, free of all custom and service."

Ada devoted her time to good works, improving the lot of the Church at Haddington, where she resided. Ada gave lands to the south and west of the River Tyne near to the only crossing of the river for miles, to found a convent of Cistercian nuns ("white nuns") dedicated to St. Mary, in what was to become the separate Burgh of Nungate. The extant remains are still to be seen in the ruined parish church of St. Martin. The nunnery she endowed with the lands of Begbie, at Garvald and Keith Marischal amongst other temporal lands. Miller, however, states that she only "founded and richly endowed a nunnery at the Abbey of Haddington" and that "Haddington, as demesne of the Crown, reverted to her son William the Lion upon her death".

=== Haddington seat ===
According to inscriptions within the town of Haddington, Ada's residence was located near the present-day County buildings and Sheriff Court. Ada died in 1178 and is thought to be buried locally. Her remaining dower-lands were brought back into the royal demesne and, later, William the Lion's wife, Ermengarde de Beaumont, is said to have taken to her bed in Ada's house to bear the future Alexander II. Miller states that when the future king was born in Haddington in 1198, it took place "in the palace of Haddington".

== Issue ==
Ada's children (in an approximate order of birth) were:

- Ada of Huntingdon, who married Count Floris III of Holland
- Margaret of Huntingdon, who married 1) Conan IV, Duke of Brittany and 2) Humphrey III de Bohun
- Malcolm IV, King of Scots
- William the Lion, King of Scots
- David of Scotland, Earl of Huntingdon, who married Matilda of Chester. Through their daughter, Isobel, they were the ancestors of Robert the Bruce.
- Matilda (or Maud) of Huntingdon, who died unmarried in 1152.
- Marjorie of Huntingdon, who married Gille Críst, Earl of Angus. They were also ancestors of Robert the Bruce.

== Sources ==
- Dunbar, Archibald H., (1899) Scottish Kings – A Revised Chronology of Scottish History 1005–1625 Edinburgh, p. 65.
- Oram, Richard, The Canmores: Kings & Queens of the Scots 1040–1290. Tempus, Stroud, 2002. ISBN 0-7524-2325-8
