= Little Ellingham =

Village in Norfolk, England

Coordinates: 52.55305°N 0.95654°E

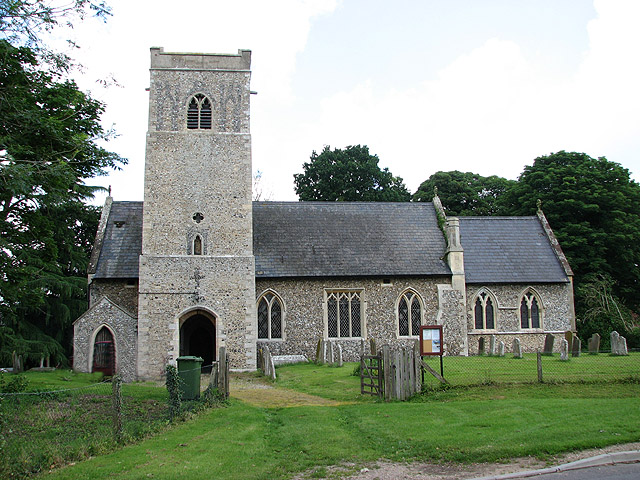
- Saint Peter Parish Church, Little Ellingham

- Location within Norfolk
- Area: 6.24 km^{2} (2.41 sq mi)
- Population: 250 (parish, 2011 census)
  - Density: 40/km^{2} (100/sq mi)
- OS grid reference: TM004992
  - London: 104 miles (167 km)
- Civil parish: Little Ellingham CP
- District: Breckland
- Shire county: Norfolk
- Region: East
- Country: England
- Sovereign state: United Kingdom
- Post town: ATTLEBOROUGH
- Postcode district: NR17
- Dialling code: 01953
- Police: Norfolk
- Fire: Norfolk
- Ambulance: East of England
- Website: https://www.littleellinghampc.info/

Little Ellingham is a village and civil parish in the English county of Norfolk. The village is 4.6 miles (7.4 km) north-west of Attleborough, 2 miles (3.2 km) north-west of its sister village of Great Ellingham, 18.8 miles (30.3 km) west-south-west of Norwich and 105 miles (169 km) north-east of London. The nearest railway station is at Attleborough for the Breckland Line which runs between Cambridge and Norwich. The nearest airport is Norwich International Airport.

Little Ellingham is served by St Peter's Church in the Benefice of Great Ellingham.

== History ==
The villages name means 'Homestead/village of Ella's people' or possibly, 'homestead/village at Ella's place'.

Little Ellingham has an entry in the Domesday Book of 1085. In the great book, Little Ellingham is recorded by the names “Ailincham”, “Elincgham” and “Ellingham. The main landholder is the King but in the custody of William de Warenne and Godric. The survey also mentions 12 cattle and 34 goats.

== Historic buildings ==
Located to the northwest of the church is Little Ellingham hall and its associated clock tower, both built in 1855. The brick tower, which stands at the centre of a group of cottages, is three stories high with a cupola on the top.

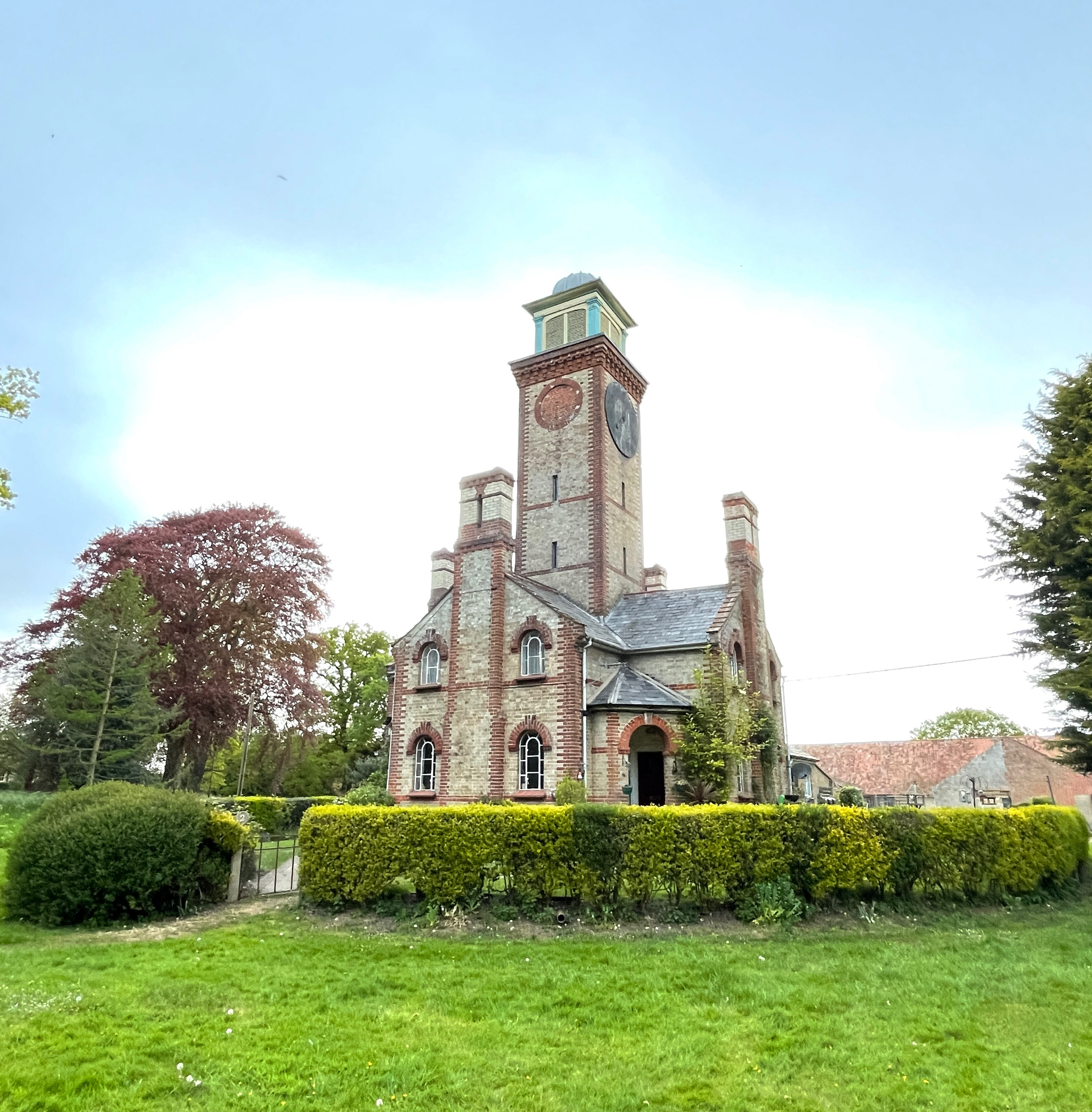
The clock tower (1855)

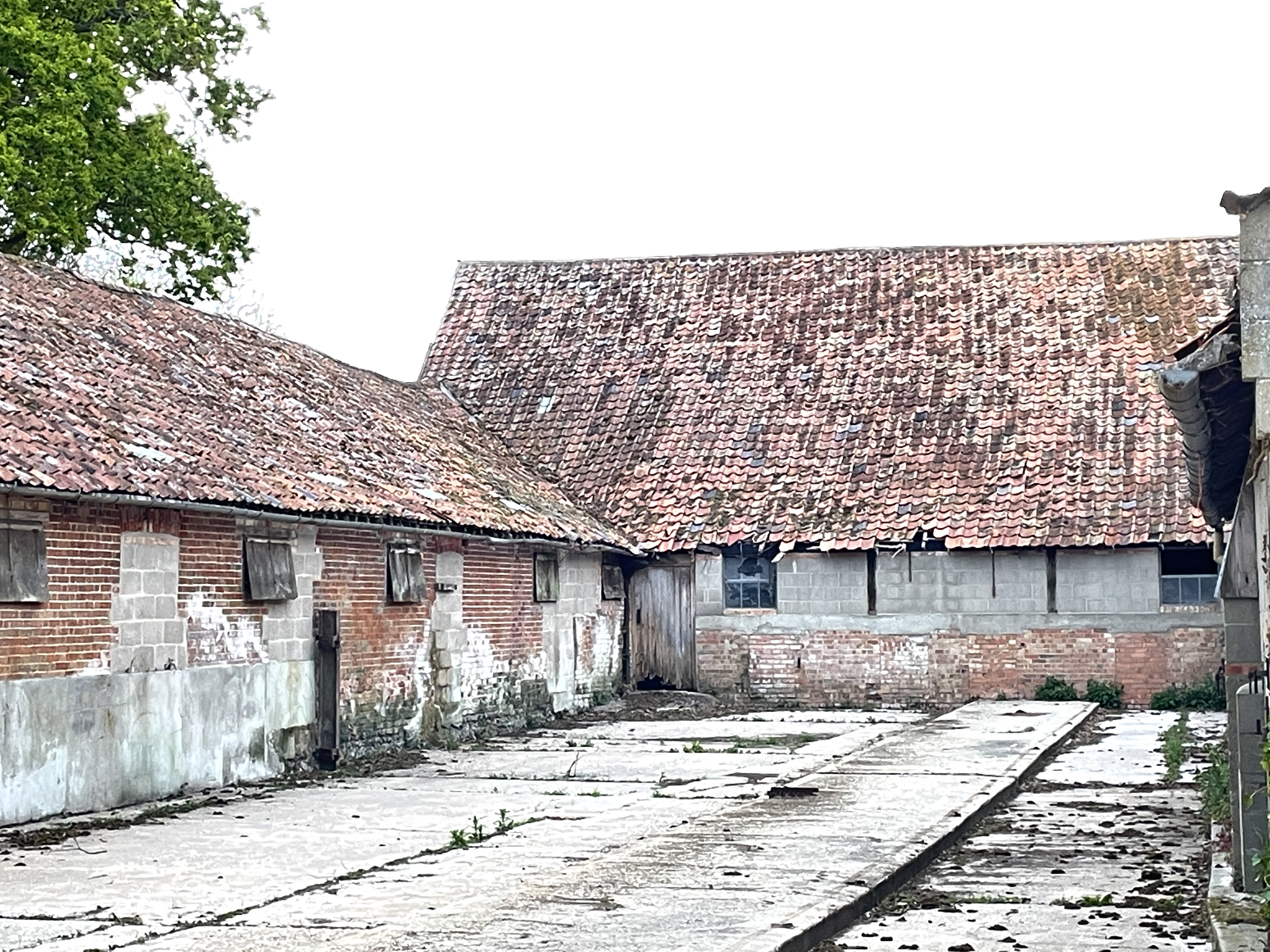
Old farm buildings, Hall Farm
