= Roger de Beaumont, 2nd Earl of Warwick =

English Earl

Roger de Beaumont, 2nd Earl of Warwick (c. 1102 – 12 June 1153) was the elder son of Henry de Beaumont, 1st Earl of Warwick and Margaret (d. after 1156), daughter of Geoffroy, Count of Perche and Beatrix of Montdidier. He was also known as Roger de Newburgh.

The borough of Warwick remembers him as the founder of the Hospital of S. Michael for lepers which he endowed with the tithes of Wedgnock, and other property; he also endowed the House of the Templars beyond the bridge. He also built the Chapel of St James the Great in Warwick which is now part of the Lord Leycester Hospital. In the reign of King Stephen he founded a priory dedicated to S. Cenydd at Llangennith, Co. Glamorgan and he attached it as a cell to the Abbey of S. Taurinus at Evreux in Normandy.

== Family and children ==
In 1130, he married Gundreda de Warenne, daughter of William de Warenne, 2nd Earl of Surrey and Elizabeth de Vermandois. They had children:

1. William de Beaumont, 3rd Earl of Warwick
2. Waleran de Beaumont, 4th Earl of Warwick (1153 – 12 December 1204)
3. Agnes de Beaumont, married Geoffrey de Clinton, Chamberlain to the king and son of Geoffrey de Clinton, the founder of Kenilworth Castle and Priory
4. Gundred de Beaumont (c. 1135 – 1200), married:
  1. Hugh Bigod, 1st Earl of Norfolk

Peerage of England
Preceded by Henry de Beaumont	Earl of Warwick; 1123–1153	Succeeded by William de Beaumont
