= Gundred, Countess of Norfolk =

Anglo-Norman noblewoman

Gundred de Beaumont (died 1200×1206) was an Anglo-Norman noblewoman and the founder of Bungay Priory. She was a daughter of Roger de Beaumont, Earl of Warwick, and his wife, Gundred de Warenne. Her first husband was Hugh Bigod, Earl of Norfolk (died 1177), and her second Roger de Glanvill, brother of the Chief Justiciar Ranulf de Glanvill. In the Curia Regis Rolls, she is always referred to as 'Countess Gundred'.

== First marriage ==
Gundred married Hugh after his first marriage was annulled, sometime before 1160. She founded the nunnery at Bungay around that time with lands from her maritagium, including five churches at Bungay, Metingham and Ilketelshale. Gundred and Hugh had two sons, Hugh and William. A certain "Countess Gundred" whose name appears in the Durham Liber Vitae after that of Earl William fitz Patrick was probably the earl's wife and possibly a daughter of the earl and countess of Norfolk.

Following the earl's death, Gundred laid claim to her husband's acquisitions, including the earldom, in the name of her eldest son. As a result, King Henry II seized the earldom and the late earl's property. After the accession of Richard I in 1189, her stepson, Roger Bigod, was recognized as earl. In 1196, the king turned over three disputed manors in Suffolk to Roger. That same year, he sued Gundred for a half knight's fee she had purchased while married to Hugh. Citing coverture, the court found in his favour: Gundred "could have no chattels for herself in the time of her husband which were not her husband's." Finally, in 1199, the younger Hugh renounced his claims to his half-brother in return for a fief.

Despite their dispute, Roger did grant Gundred a dower. In 1194, when a certain Yvo initiated an assize of mort d'ancestor against Gundred for part of her dower, her stepson came to her defence. In 1196, in an assize of darrein presentment, she acknowledged that her "free dower" would pass to Roger and his heirs on her death. In 1199, following the resolution of his dispute with Hugh, Roger granted the village of Little Bradley to Gundred to finally settle the question of her dower.

== Second marriage ==
Gundred may have met her second husband as early as 1166, for in that year he received a fief from Earl Hugh. The date of the marriage is uncertain, as is the date of his death. He was alive in 1192 and dead by 1196. His heir was his niece Agnes, daughter of his brother William. In 1196, Gundred sued Agnes's first husband, Thomas Bigod, for the dower she was owed as Roger's widow—the three villages of Yoxford, Middleton and Roughton. In 1198, she paid the king 100 pounds for the right never to be married again against her will. In 1199, she sued Agnes's second husband, Robert de Crec, for the dower she claimed not to have received.

Sometime before 1197, Gundred acquired land at Wangford. She and her son Hugh did fealty and homage for it to William Brom. Hugh seemingly died in 1203 without issue, probably before his mother. She granted the land at Wangford to Bungay Priory. Her younger son William was both her heir and Hugh's.
