= William de Beaumont, 3rd Earl of Warwick =

English noble

William de Newburgh or Beaumont
- 3rd Earl of Warwick
- Coat of arms of the Earls of Warwick
- Died: 15 November 1184
- Noble family: Newburgh or Beaumont
- Spouse: Matilda de Percy
- Issue: none
- Father: Earl Roger of Warwick
- Mother: Gundreda de Warenne, countess of Warwick

William de Beaumont, 3rd Earl of Warwick (before 1140 – 15 November 1184) was an English nobleman. He was married to Matilda de Percy (died 1204), daughter of William de Percy (died 1175) and his first wife Alice of Tonbridge (died 1148).

William was the eldest of three sons of Earl Roger of Warwick. On his father's death in 1153, William may have been a minor. His tenure of the earldom was marked by an internal family fight over possession of the marcher lordship of Gower, which was claimed by his uncle Henry supported by his grandmother Margaret, whose dower it was. He experienced financial troubles brought on by considerable debts he incurred in the 1170s. To clear them, he had to surrender Gower to King Henry II before 1184.

Earl William may have hoped his great marriage to the wealthy Yorkshire heiress Matilda de Percy would help redeem his fortunes. But Matilda got a lesser share of the Percy lands, and produced no heir for the earldom. She survived her husband by two decades, and the large dowry she enjoyed from the earldom crippled it financially for two generations. William is said to have founded the hospital of St John of Warwick and was a patron of several religious houses. He did however have a bad relationship with the family foundation of the priory of the Holy Sepulchre in Warwick, which earned him a letter of rebuke from the patriarch of Jerusalem. William died in 1184, and was succeeded by his brother Waleran.

== Sources ==
- Cokayne, George E. (1945), The New Complete Peerage, vol. 12, St. Catherine Press Limited
- The Newburgh Earldom of Warwick and its Charters, 1088-1253 ed. David Crouch and Richard Dace (Dugdale Society, 48, 2015)

Peerage of England
Preceded by Roger	Earl of Warwick; 1153–1184	Succeeded by Waleran
