= Bellencombre =

- Commune
- Location of Bellencombre
- Location within France Location within Normandy
- Coordinates: 49°42′30″N 1°13′37″E
- Country: France
- Region: Normandy
- Department: Seine-Maritime
- Arrondissement: Dieppe
- Canton: Neufchâtel-en-Bray
- Intercommunality: CC Bray-Eawy

Government
  - Mayor (2026–32): Thierry Prevost
- Area^{1}: 12.91 km^{2} (4.98 sq mi)
- Elevation: 83 m (272 ft)
- Highest elevation: 199 m (653 ft)
- Lowest elevation: 69 m (226 ft)
- Population (2023): 564
  - Density: 43.7/km^{2} (113/sq mi)
- Time zone: UTC+01:00 (CET)
  - Summer (DST): UTC+02:00 (CEST)
- INSEE/Postal code: 76070 /76680
- ^{1} French Land Register data, which excludes lakes, ponds, glaciers > 1 km^{2} (0.386 sq mi or 247 acres) and river estuaries.

Bellencombre is a commune in the Seine-Maritime department in the Normandy region in northern France.

== Geography ==
A forestry and farming village situated by the banks of the river Varenne in the Pays de Bray, some 18 miles (29 km) south of Dieppe at the junction of the D151, D154 and D48 roads.

== Population ==
Historical population
Year	Pop.	±% p.a.
1968	654	—
1975	648	−0.13%
1982	640	−0.18%
1990	638	−0.04%
1999	662	+0.41%
2007	637	−0.48%
2012	692	+1.67%
2017	680	−0.35%
2023	564	−3.07%
Source: INSEE

== Places of interest ==
- The Château de Bellencombre, founded in 1050 by William de Warenne, later the 1st Earl of Warenne and Surrey.
- The church of St. Pierre, dating from the nineteenth century.
- The church of St. Martin, dating from the twelfth century.
- The chapel of St. Christophe, dating from the sixteenth century.
- The gothic chapel, dating from the thirteenth century.
- A sixteenth-century stone cross.
- The sixteenth-century château de La Grande Heuze
- The three châteaux: de La Crique; de La Quaine and Mont-Roty.

== See also ==
- Communes of the Seine-Maritime department
