= Gundred, Countess of Surrey =

English noble

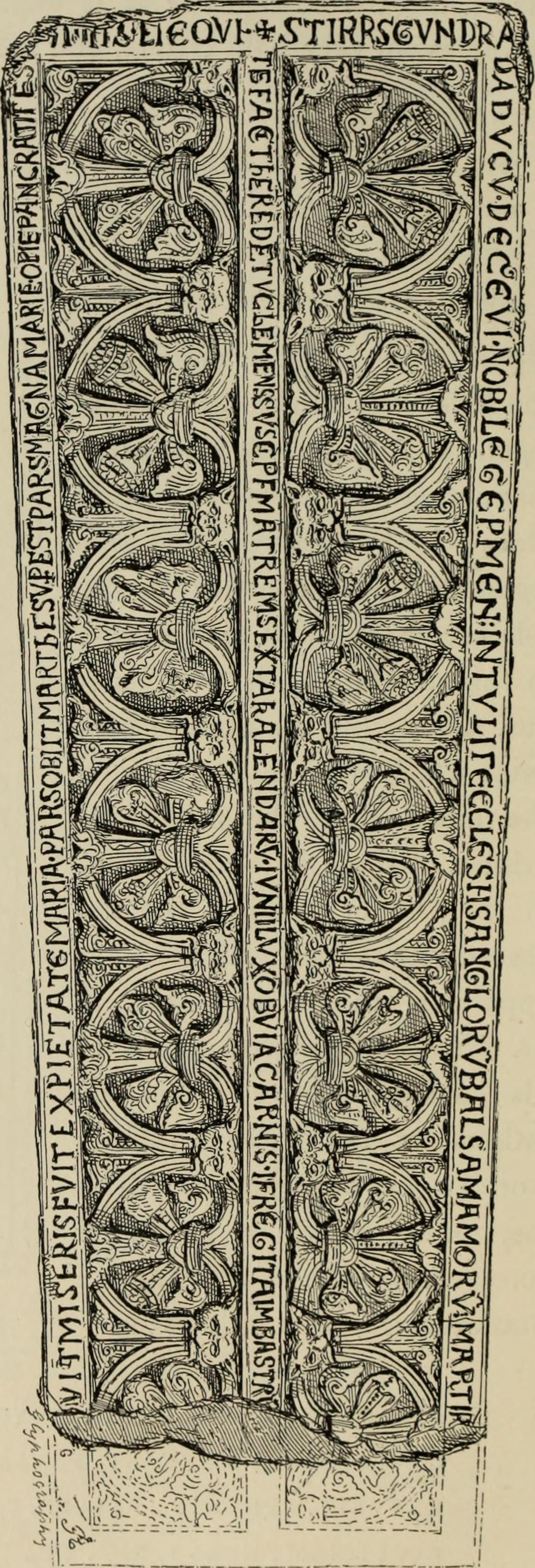
Her Tournai marble memorial, illustrated in Charles Boutell's Christian monuments in England and Wales (1854)

Gundred or Gundreda (Latin: Gundrada) (died 27 May 1085) was the Flemish-born wife of an early Norman baron, William de Warenne, 1st Earl of Surrey. She and her husband established Lewes Priory in Sussex.

== Life ==
Gundred was almost certainly born in Flanders, and was a sister of Gerbod the Fleming, 1st Earl of Chester, and thus daughter of Gerbod, hereditary advocate of the Abbey of Saint Bertin. She is explicitly so called by Orderic Vitalis, as well as the chronicle of Hyde Abbey. She was also the sister of Frederick of Oosterzele-Scheldewindeke, who was killed c.1070 by Hereward the Wake.

Gundred married before 1070 William de Warenne, 1st Earl of Surrey (d. 20 June 1088), who rebuilt Lewes Castle, making it his chief residence. Sometime between 1078 and 1082, Gundred and her husband set out for Rome, visiting monasteries along the way. In Burgundy they were unable to go any farther due to a war between Emperor Henry IV and Pope Gregory VII. They visited Cluny Abbey and were impressed with the monks and their dedication. William and Gundred decided to found a Cluniac priory on their own lands in England. They sent to Hugh, the abbot of Cluny, for monks to come to England at their monastery. Hugh was reluctant yet eventually sent several monks, including Lazlo, who became the first abbot. The house they founded was Lewes Priory, dedicated to St Pancras. Gundred died in childbirth on 27 May 1085 at Castle Acre, Norfolk, one of her husband's estates, and was buried at the chapter house of Lewes Priory. He was later buried beside her.

== Tombstone ==
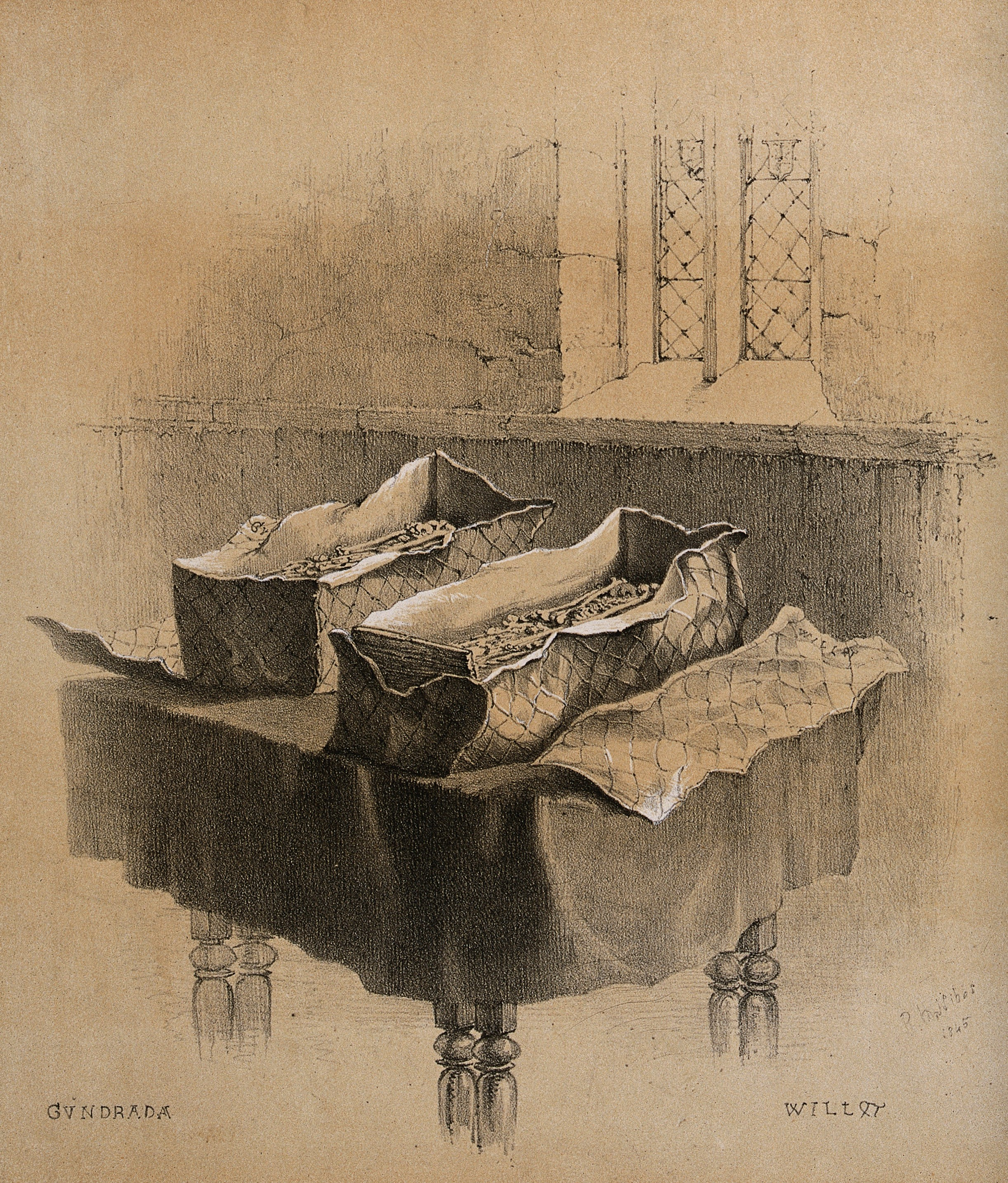
Two leaden cists containing the remains of Gundred and her husband; chalk lithograph by F. W. Woledge after a drawing by R. H. Nibbs, 1845

In the course of the centuries which followed, both tombstones disappeared from the priory. In 1774 Edward Clarke discovered Gundred's in Isfield Church (seven miles from Lewes), over the remains of Edward Shirley, Esq., who died in 1550. William Burrell had it removed on 2 October 1775 to St John's Church, Southover, where it was placed on display.

In 1845, during excavations through the Priory grounds for the Brighton Lewes and Hastings Railway, the lead chests containing the remains of the Earl and his Countess were discovered and were deposited temporarily beneath Gundred's tombstone. In 1847 a Norman Revival chapel was erected by public subscription, adjoining the present vestry and chancel. Before the remains were reinterred in this chapel, both chests were opened to ascertain if there were any contents, which was found to be the case. New chests were made and used, and the ancient ones preserved and placed in two recessed arches in the southern wall. The Earl's chest has lost some lead. Gundred's chest remains in a good state of preservation. Across the upper part of the right arch is the name Gvndrada. Her tombstone is of black Tournai marble.

== Family ==
The children of William de Warenne and Gundred were:

- William II de Warenne (d. 11 May 1138), buried in Lewes Priory.
- Reginald de Warenne, an adherent of Robert of Normandy.
- Edith de Warenne, married first Gerard de Gournay, Lord of Gournay-en-Bray and second Drew de Monchy.

== Controversy on parentage ==
Claims based in part on the non-contemporary Lewes Priory cartulary (Note: The Lewes priory cartulary was compiled centuries after the time of the purported foundation documents copied within, and these documents are thought to have been altered or forged to provide desirable royal parentage for the priory's patron family. For more information on these charters see: English Historical Documents 1042-1189, ed. David C. Douglas, George W. Greenaway, Vol. II (Oxford University Press, New York, 1953), p. 605; L.C. Loyd, 'The Origin of the Family of Warenne' ‘’Yorks Archaeol. Journal’’, vol. xxxi, pp. 97-113; and C. T. Clay, ‘'Early Yorkshire Charters’’, vol. VIII (1949), pp. 59.-62.) suggested Gundred was a daughter of William the Conqueror by his spouse Matilda of Flanders, but this is not accepted by most modern historians. The early-19th-century writer Thomas Stapleton had argued she was a daughter of Matilda born prior to her marriage to Duke William. This theory sparked a debate consisting of a series of published papers. It culminated with those of Edmond Chester Waters and Edward Augustus Freeman, who argued the theories could not be supported. (Note: For an extensive discussion regarding the participants in this nineteenth-century debate see: Victoria Chandler, 'Gundrada de Warenne and the Victorian Gentlemen-Scholars', Southern History, Vol. 12 (1990), pp. 68-81) Nonetheless, this purported relationship between Gundred and the Conqueror continues to appear, despite being dismissed by modern scholars.

== Additional references ==
- Barlow, Frank, The Feudal Kingdom of England 1012 - 1216, London, 1955
- Cokayne, George Edward, The Complete Peerage, Vol. iv, p. 670 Chart:Surrey or Warenne before 1135...
- Keats-Rohan, K.S.B., Domesday People, a Prosopography of Persons Occurring in English Documents 1066-1166 (The Boydell Press, Woodbridge, 1999), p. 480
- Moriarty, George Andrews, The Plantagenet Ancestry (Mormon Pioneer Genealogy Society, Salt Lake City, UT, 1985), p. 184
- Norgate, Kate (1890). "Gundrada de Warenne" . In Stephen, Leslie; Lee, Sidney (eds.). Dictionary of National Biography. Vol. 23. London: Smith, Elder & Co. p. 338.
- Schwennicke, Detlev, Europäische Stammtafeln: Stammtafeln zur Geschichte der Europaischen Staaten, Neue Folge, Band III Teilband 4, Das Feudale Frankreich und Sien Einfluss auf des Mittelalters (Marburg, Germany: Verlag von J. A. Stargardt, 1989), Tafel 699
- Weis, Frederick Lewis, The Magna Charta Sureties, 1215, ed: Walter Lee Sheppard, Jr., William R. Beall, 5th Edition (Genealogical Publishing Co., 1999), Line 158-1
