= Lexham =

Parish in Norfolk, England

Coordinates: 52.7272°N 0.7468°E

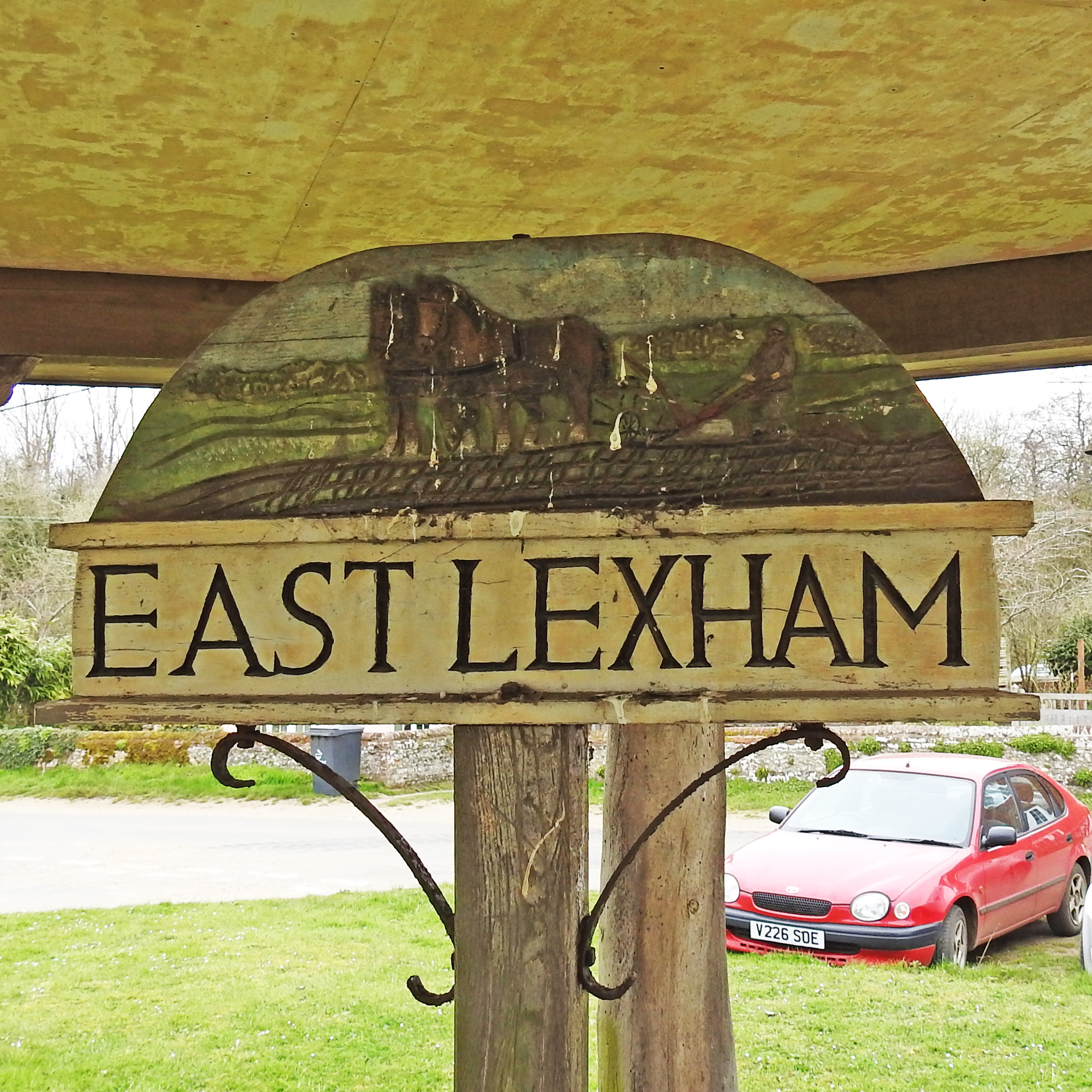
- East Lexham Village Sign

- Location within Norfolk
- Area: 3.76 sq mi (9.7 km^{2})
- Population: 148 (2021 census)
  - Density: 39/sq mi (15/km^{2})
- OS grid reference: TF8558517933
- District: Breckland
- Shire county: Norfolk
- Region: East
- Country: England
- Sovereign state: United Kingdom
- Post town: KING'S LYNN
- Postcode district: PE32
- Dialling code: 01328 (East Lexham); 01760 (West Lexham)
- UK Parliament: Mid Norfolk

Lexham is a civil parish, consisting of the twin villages of East Lexham and West Lexham, in the English county of Norfolk.

Lexham is located 7.7 miles (12.4 km) north of Swaffham and 30.1 miles (48.4 km) west-north-west of Norwich.

== History ==
Lexham's name is of Anglo-Saxon origin and derives from the Old English for 'leech homestead', likely in the sense of a physician.

In the Domesday Book, Lexham is listed as a settlement of 45 households in the hundred of Launditch. In 1086, the village was divided between the East Anglian estates of William de Warenne and Ralph de Beaufour.

Lexham Hall was built in 1660 and was re-modelled twice in the Eighteenth Century. The building was used by the Royal Army Service Corps during the Second World War but burnt down in 1950, being restored again in 1972. The modern gardens were designed by Dame Sylvia Crowe which are open for charity events.

== Geography ==
According to the 2021 census, Lexham has a population of 148 people which shows an increase from the 146 people recorded in the 2011 census.

== St. Andrew's Church ==
East Lexham's parish church is dedicated to Saint Andrew and is one of Norfolk's 124 remaining Anglo-Saxon round-tower churches. St. Andrew's has been dated to the Eleventh Century with a significant restoration effort made in the late-Nineteenth Century. The church possesses good examples of Nineteenth Century stained glass including one depiction of Saint Michael and the dragon installed by James Powell and Sons. Furthermore, the church features examples of artwork by Richard Foster depicting the Nativity, Saint Andrew as a fisherman and the Day of Judgement.

== St. Nicholas' Church ==
West Lexham's former parish church is dedicated to Saint Andrew and is one of Norfolk's 124 remaining round-tower churches, dating from the medieval period. St. Nicholas' is located on Hall Lane and has been Grade II listed since 1960. The church no longer holds Sunday service and is part of the Launditch & Upper Nar Benefice.

St. Nicholas' was largely rebuilt in the 1990s after it was found to be severely subsiding but still holds a stained-glass window depicting Christ designed by the Lobin workshop of Tours.

== Notable residents ==
- Richard Foster (b. 1945), painter, born in East Lexham.

== Governance ==
Lexham is part of the electoral ward of Launditch for local elections and is part of the district of Breckland.

The village's national constituency is Mid Norfolk which has been represented by the Conservative's George Freeman MP since 2010.
