= St Peter's Church, Forncett =

Church in Norfolk, England

Coordinates: 52°29′26″N 1°11′15″E

St Peter's Church
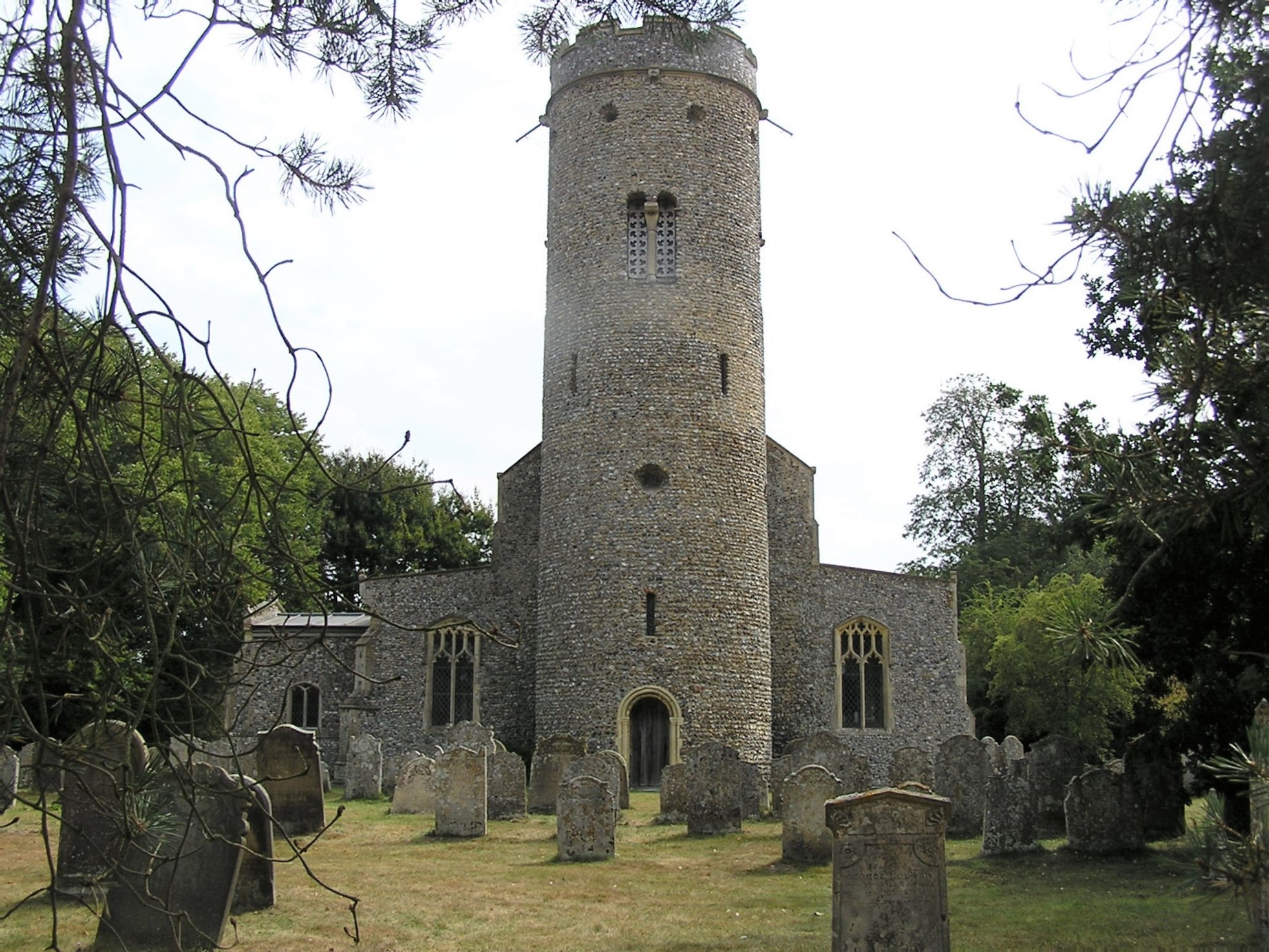
- St Peter's Church, Forncett St Peter's, Norfolk

- Location within Norfolk
- Country: England
- Denomination: Church of England
- Website: www.forncett.info/forncett-churches/st-peter.html

History
- Founded: 11th Century
- Dedication: St Peter and St Paul

Architecture
- Heritage designation

Listed Building – Grade I
- Official name: Church of St Peter, Forncett
- Designated: 7 December 1959
- Reference no.: 1152619

Administration
- Province: Canterbury
- Diocese: Norwich
- Parish: Upper Tas Valley All Saints

St Peter's is one of seven churches in the parish of Upper Tas Valley All Saints in south Norfolk, ten miles south of Norwich, England. The full name is St Peter's and St Paul's, commonly known as St Peter's, and this was formerly the parish church for Forncett St Peter. It is an active place of worship and a nationally significant Grade I listed building. Its Anglo-Saxon round tower, built about 1000 AD, is considered one of the best in the country. There are other Anglo-Saxon features. Much of the main building is of later, mainly 14th and 15th century, date. Significant features are: the 1485 Drake tomb, a unique ancient staircase in the tower, carved pew ends, fine ledger slabs in the chancel and nave, good examples of Victorian coloured glass windows, and the ring of six bells. There is a comprehensive modern guide to the church. There is a connection with William Wordsworth: his sister, Dorothy, lived at the rectory from 1788 until 1794 with her uncle, the rector, William Cookson.

The church is on the Heritage at Risk Register. There is critical need for repair and a programme of renovation. A community group, The Friends of St Peter's, was set up in 2019 to lead a major fund-raising campaign.

== History ==
According to the Domesday Book of 1086, the estate of Forncett was held by Roger Bigod of Norfolk (died 1107) and is said to have had two churches, identified as the present-day St Peter's and St Mary's, which are recorded as separate parish churches. The Anglo-Saxon church was simple in plan, consisting of the tower, nave and chancel. It was quite large by the standards of that time, the chancel measuring 20 feet square. The round tower and a large amount of fabric at the west end of the nave and in the chancel date from the 11th century.

In the 14th century a three-bay clerestory was added and the roof raised. The chancel was extended, chancel arch enlarged and narrow aisles added either side of the nave. In the later 15th century the aisles were widened, large windows in the perpendicular style put in and the porch added. The porch would have been used, amongst other things, for marriages, resolution of judicial matters, burial and giving of alms. Around this time the font, rood screen and carved pew ends were also added. Much internal ornamentation was damaged or destroyed during the Reformation and Commonwealth periods, including the pew ends. The advowson of Forncett (the right to present a nominee for the post of minister) was purchased in 1725 by Dr Rowland Hill, who bequeathed it to St John's College, Cambridge.

During the 19th century there were two phases of alteration. In 1832 two new windows were put in the west wall, either side of the tower. The Rev W. Grieve Wilson, the minister for 49 years from 1845, undertook considerable refurbishment and repair, partly financed by the sale of the lead from the roof, which was replaced by Westmorland slate. The centre buttress was removed from the south wall and the wall encased in knapped flint. The brown plaster that covered the tower was removed in 1851. The gallery, rood screen and old pulpit were removed, seating reorganized and pew end carvings restored. In 1872 the organ was installed. Stained glass was added to four windows between 1854 and 1892 and in 1897 the reredos was installed.

In 1986 further restoration work took place, including new stonework in the clerestory and redecoration. During this, a piscina was discovered behind the organ, providing evidence that there had been a side altar at one time.

In 1905 the two churches – St Peter's and St Mary's – came under the same parish with one minister. Both are now part of the eight-church Upper Tas Valley Benefice along with the churches at Tacolneston, Hapton, Wreningham, Forncett End and Ashwellthorpe (forming the parish of Upper Tas Valley All Saints) and the parish of Fundenhall, and are all served by one Priest in Charge.

== Architecture ==
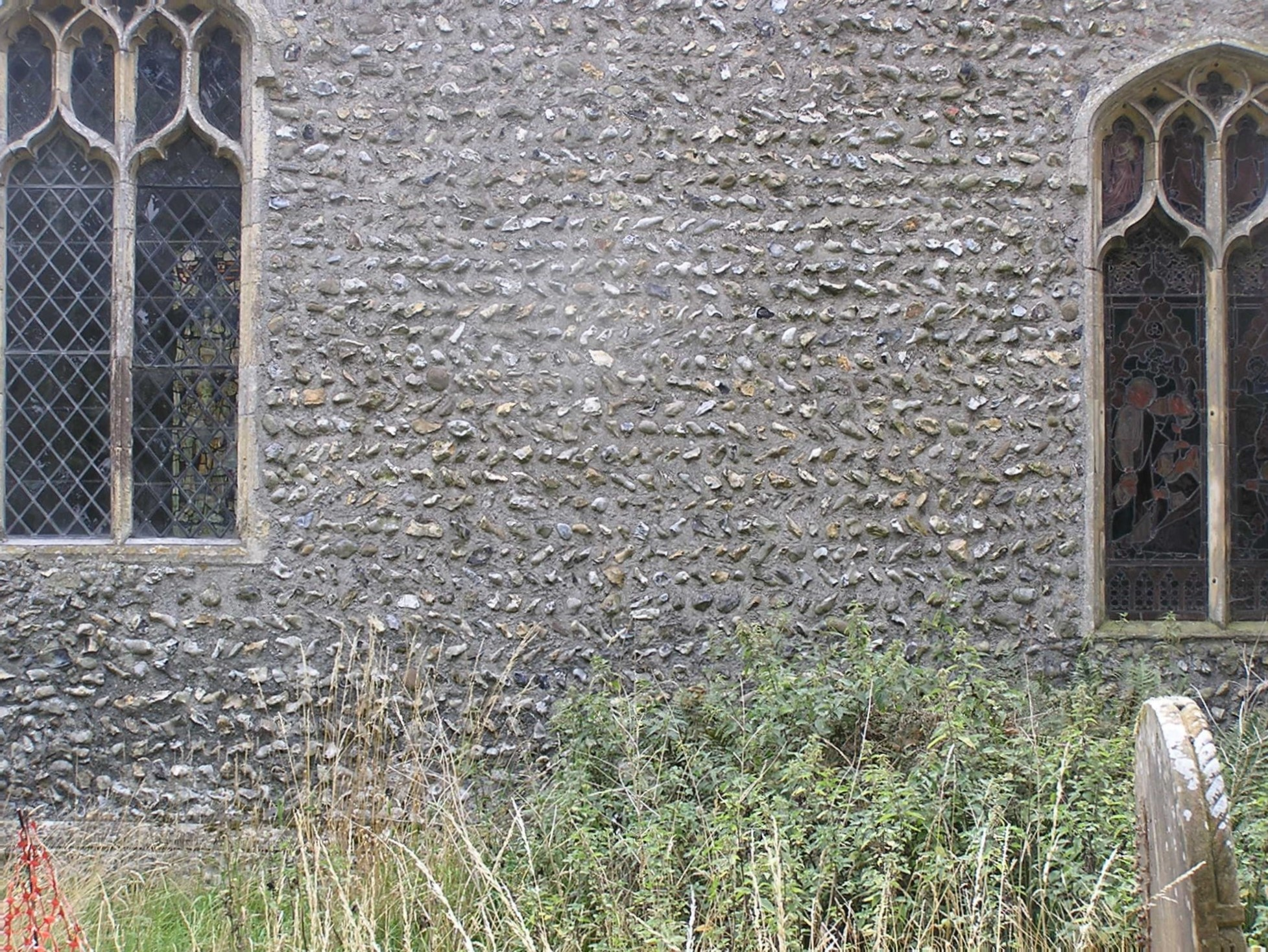
Chancel, north wall, showing Saxon herringbone pattern flint-work

=== Exterior ===
Tower The tower is considered outstanding. Its date has been debated: either late Saxon or early Norman. Bill Wilson, in his revised Norfolk 2: North-West and South edition of Pevsner published in 2002, attributes it entirely to the Anglo-Saxon period. From a stylistic point of view, the characteristic double bell openings divided in the middle by stone shafts crowned with capitals, is undeniably Anglo-Saxon. Unusually, the capital in the east opening, although weathered, bears traces of intricate carving. The walls, built of rubble faced with knapped flint set in lime and mortar, are original to the height of the stringcourse. Below the latter are a series of openings beginning with eight small round ones, then four large openings, each with two lights separated by a shaft. The south and north-facing of these have triangular tops, the east and west-facing openings have round tops. Below these are four narrow openings, three circular windows and finally a small lancet window. The tower is 61 feet (19 metres) high.

The parapet and the stringcourse decorated with gargoyles are 14th century.

Chancel The outer walls of the chancel reveal extensive areas of Saxon herringbone pattern flintwork – flints laid in a row at a slight angle and in the following row laid at the opposite angle forming a pattern.

South wall There is a 13th-century priest's door in the south wall. Above it are traces of an opening. It is Anglo-Saxon in character, but of uncertain function. It has been suggested that it may be the remains of an Anglo-Saxon double-splayed window of the same date as the tower.

West door Although it looks Norman, the current west door is a Victorian imitation, and a different, medieval, doorway can be seen in Ladbroke's 1823 drawing.

Porch The entrance into the church is on the north side through the 15th century porch which, when it was built, played a much more significant role than it does today. It has a square front, knapped fint with flushwork panels. The corner buttresses were restored in 1832. It is decorated with the emblems of St Peter, shields with crossed keys, and crossed swords for St Paul. There is also an inscription above, which is now almost impossible to decipher, but reads:

‘Saints Petur and Pawle patronnys of yis place Praye to Ihui(n) hevenyt I may see his face’

[Saints Peter and Paul patrons of this place Pray to Jesus in heaven that I may see His face]

The reference is to God's promise to Moses before he led his people out of Egypt (Exodus 33.20). It is common for a church dedicated to both Peter and Paul to lose the Paul along the way, which is what happened here. Further above are the letters "IHS" made in typical East Anglian flush work – a monogram of the name of Jesus Christ.

=== Interior ===
Roof The arch-braced roof is Medieval, thought to be contemporary with the 14th century arcades. It is supported by tie beams with vertical struts to the rafters and curved braces beneath, which are attached to vertical wall plates, resting on corbels. All the woodwork is held together by mortise and tenon joints with wooden pins.

Tower arch and belfry A tall and narrow round-headed archway in the west wall of the nave shows the 4-foot thickness of the Saxon tower walls. There is a rare timber staircase, with solid triangular steps, possibly 15–16th century. Under the arch is a stone mensa slab. It used to be a part of one of the altars in the church.

Carved pew ends The elaborately carved figures on the ends of the wooden pews are a main feature of the church. Carved in the 15h century, all were severely damaged during the Reformation. They were restored in the 19th century – some being repaired, whilst others are Victorian replacements. They depict a range of figures: apostles, personifications of seasons and occupations and symbols of vices. Various suggestions as to the specific identities of these figures have been made, but some are still debated. The carvings in the nave are the finest. Those in the north and south aisles are medieval, but crudely done and heavily restored and those in the chancel are all 19th century.

List of pew end subjects in the nave:

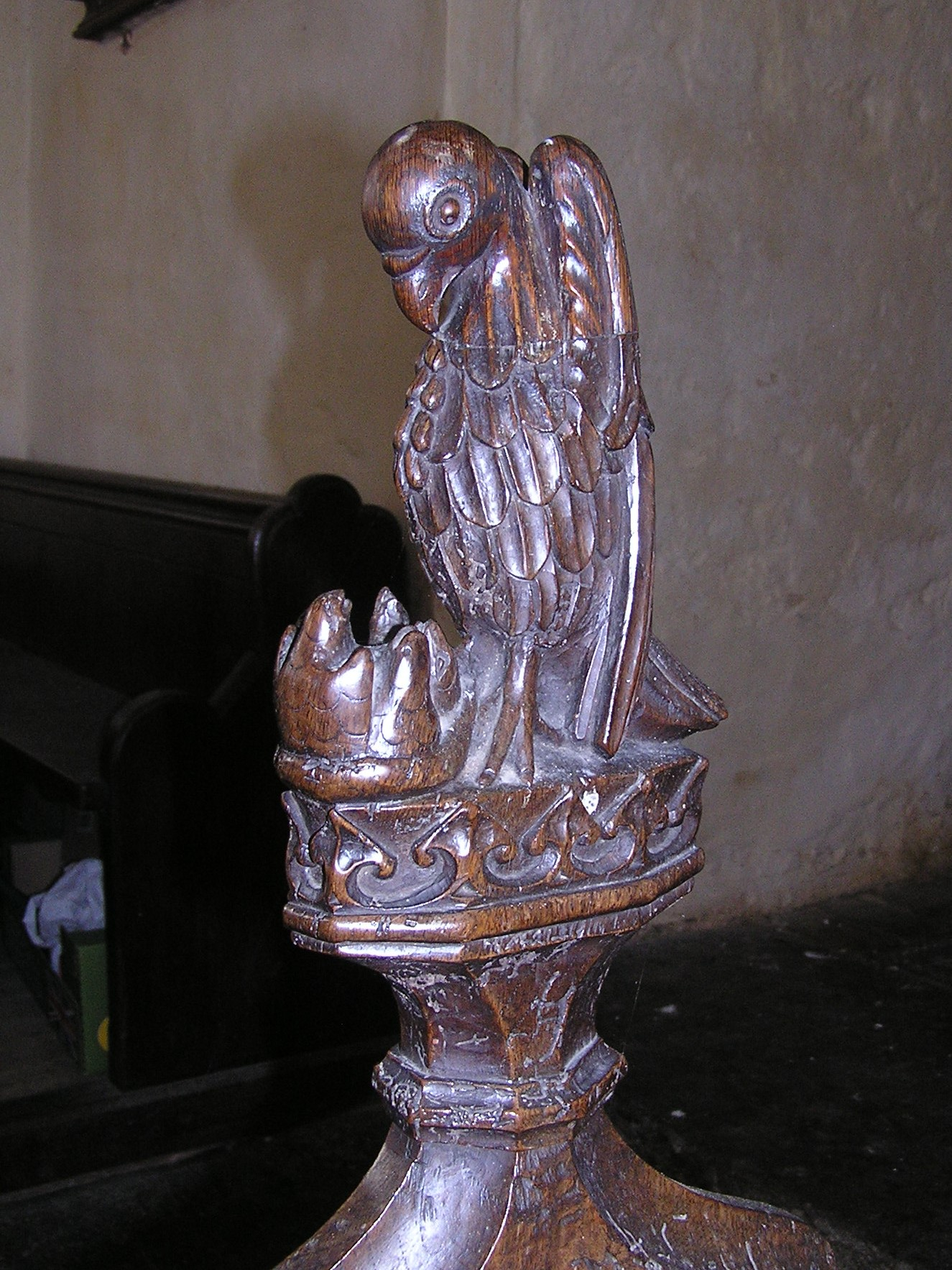
Carved wooden pew end – pelican in her piety

- (starting north side, east to west) St Simon, apostle and fisherman
- St Jude holding his boat
- St Mark seated on a lion
- St Philip holding loaves of bread
- Seated male with a scroll
- Seated male with a book
- Recumbent figure with a standing figure
- Female standing in a box
- Seated figure with devil beneath – avarice
- Lust
- August – harvest
- July – harvest
- Saint holding a cross
- St Paul (19th century)
- Pelican in her piety
- Eagle
- (starting south side, east to west) Seated male (19th century)
- April – pruning a tree
- June – haymaking
- March – sowing
- November – killing an animal for a feast
- December – feasting
- Gluttony
- Saint holding a martyr's palm
- Seated male
- Seated male holding a scroll
- Raising Lazarus from the dead
- May – hunting
- St John the evangelist
- St Luke painting the Virgin Mary

Font The font is 15th century and its original decoration has largely been obliterated. It was moved to its current location in 1877 from in front of the belfry.

Pulpit The pulpit is built from two 17th-century oak panels. It was restored in the 19th century, when it was moved to its present position. It is believed to have replaced an earlier hexagonal pulpit.

Rood screen & Reredos A rood screen was built across the entrance to the chancel in the 15th century. It was taken down in the 19th century and material from it later used in the reredos, designed by H. Wilson, that was installed behind the altar in 1897. There is a narrow stairway at the east end of the south aisle that once gave access to the rood loft, on top of the rood screen.

Piscinae There are three Medieval piscinae in the church. The finest is set into the wall on the left of the north door and is 14th century. The others are to the right of the altar and behind the organ.

Organ There is a single manual and pedal pipe organ, built circa 1850 by Holdich of London. It was installed in 1872, originally on the north side of the chancel and was moved to the south aisle in 1877. Restoration work was carried out in 1979, 1987 and in 2006, when a complete overhaul was undertaken by Richard Bower.

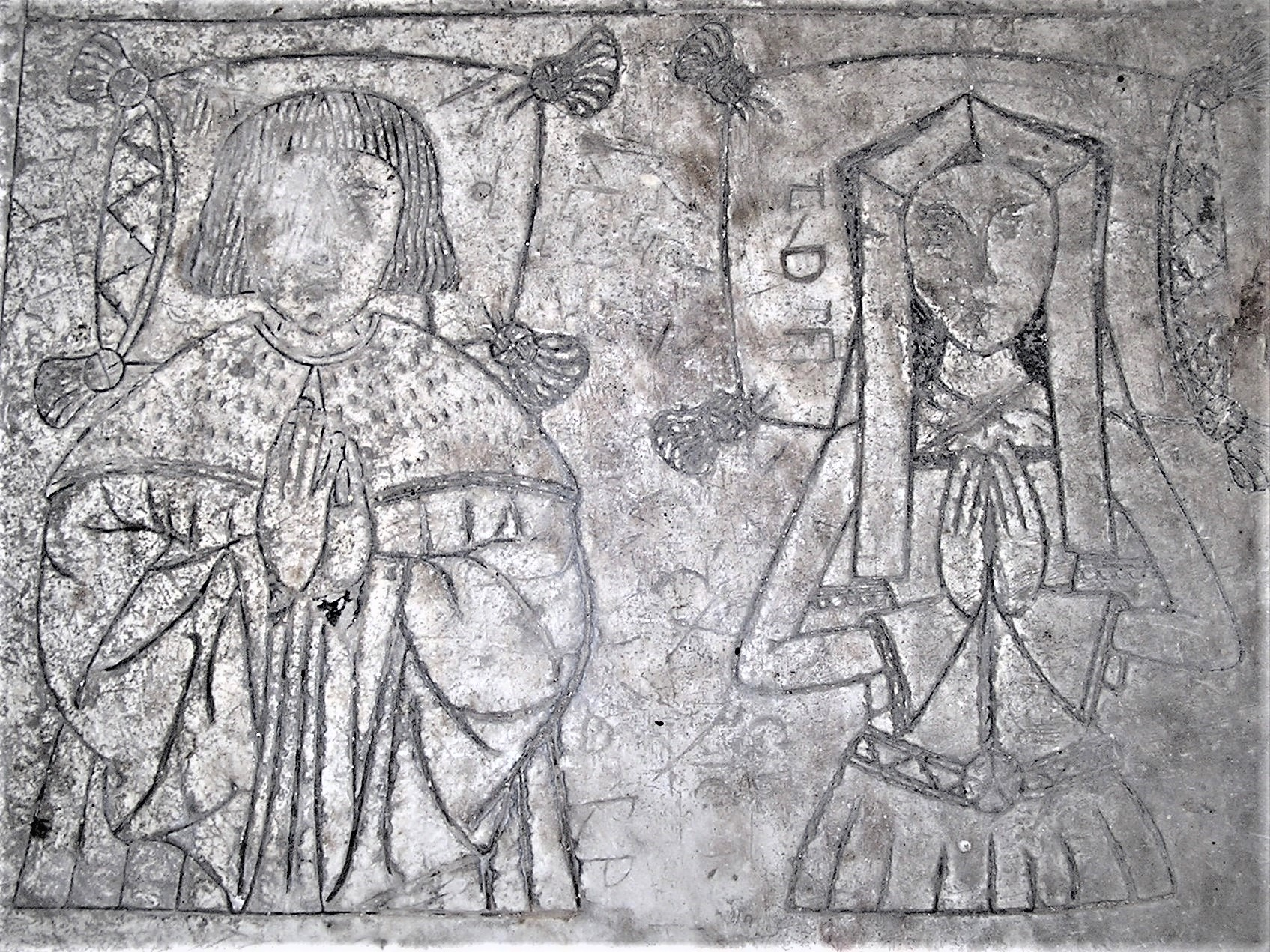
Thomas and Elizabeth Drake depicted on their alabaster tomb, 1485

Tomb The alabaster tomb of Elizabeth and Thomas Drake (died 1485) shows the couple lying side by side, carefully depicted in medieval dress, using niello work – a type of engraving that uses a black mixture to fill out the engraved lines. It may be unique in Norfolk. In her historical outline of the church, Rosemary Izat states that the inscription (now defaced) once read: "All Christian people that walk by this tomb early or late, of your cherity say a pater noster for the soul of Tho. Drake" (Weever's Funeral Monuments).

Memorials There are a number of memorials in the church, including those to the men of Forncett who fell in two world wars. Notable are two Ledger Stones, set into the floor near the belfry, each with a small brass inscription to members of the Baxter family – 1484 and 1535. In the chancel there is an oval stone tablet to the memory of Anna Cookson, daughter of William Cookson, one time rector of the parish, and a cousin of Dorothy and William Wordsworth.

Stained glass windows There are four stained glass windows, all from the 19th century, with dedications. The south chancel window depicting St Peter and St Paul is by F. W. Oliphant and dates from 1854. It has been described as ‘outstandingly good glass of very good colour and painting and a rare work’. There is an additional, lancet, stained glass window in the tower, without dedication.

== Bells ==
There is a ring of 6 bells, of 5 different dates. Despite this it is "considered to be one of the finest in the county". There were four bells in 1552 and a fifth was added in 1602. They were re-hung in 1778 and in 1875 the tenor bell, which had cracked, was recast by John Warner of Cripplegate, London. By the 1930s the bells were unusable and restoration work was carried out by John Taylor, of Loughborough, including recasting the cracked treble bell and rehanging all the bells in a two-tier bell frame. In 1982 a new treble bell was cast in memory of Mary Armstrong, a local churchwarden and headteacher, completing the ring of six.

== Churchyard ==
The church is set back from the road in a large and attractive churchyard with some well carved and interesting tomb stones. Sited on the edge of a Site of Special Scientific Interest above the valley of the River Tas, a long-distance footpath, the Tas Valley Way, passes close by.

A large area of the churchyard is managed primarily for wildlife, and it has a rich carpet of flowers and wild plants at different seasons. A survey of bats (August 2020) revealed 7 species detected in the churchyard, including a significant number of Natterer's bats (Myotis nattereri). The other species were: Common pipistrelle (Pipistrellus pipistrellus), which may be roosting in the church, Soprano pipistrelle (Pipistrellus pygmaeus), Common noctule (Nyctalus noctula), Serotine (Eptesicus serotinus), Barbastelle (Barbastella barbastellus) and Brown long-eared bat (Plecotus auritus).

== Role of the church ==
St Peter's is located within the parish of Upper Tas Valley All Saints. Information about services is available online.

The building is also a significant centre for community life in the small rural villages known collectively as Forncett, which have no natural focal point. The current phase of repair and renovation includes an emphasis on developing this secular role for the benefit of all in the community.

== See also ==
- Round-tower church
