= Yaxham =

Village in Norfolk, England

Coordinates: 52.655°N 0.965°E

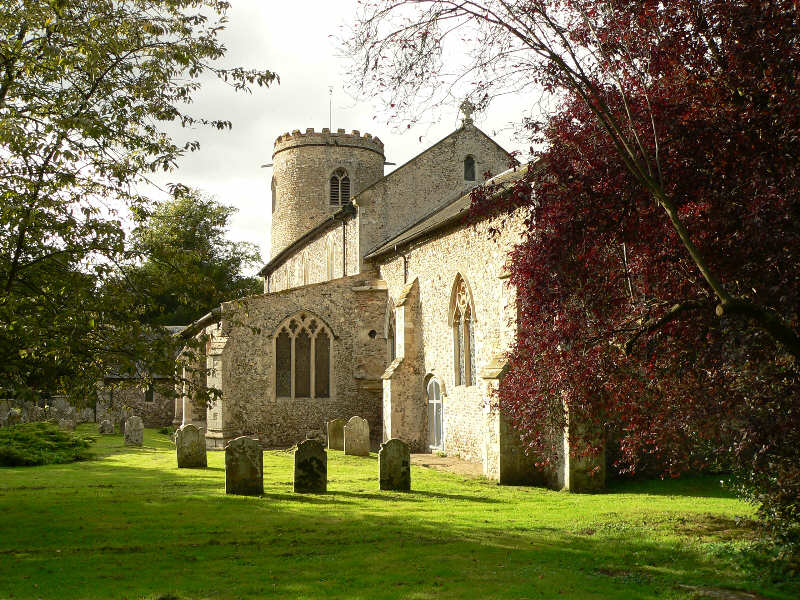
- Yaxham St Peter

- Location within Norfolk
- Area: 6.64 km^{2} (2.56 sq mi)
- Population: 677 (2001 census); 722 (2011)
  - Density: 102/km^{2} (260/sq mi)
- OS grid reference: TG005105
- Civil parish: Yaxham
- District: Breckland
- Shire county: Norfolk
- Region: East
- Country: England
- Sovereign state: United Kingdom
- Post town: DEREHAM
- Postcode district: NR19
- Dialling code: 01362
- Police: Norfolk
- Fire: Norfolk
- Ambulance: East of England
- Website: http://www.yaxham-village.co.uk/index.jsp

Yaxham is a village and civil parish in centre of the English county of Norfolk. The parish includes the village of Yaxham, together with the neighbouring community of Clint Green and the hamlet of Brakefield Green. It is 2 miles (3.2 km) south of Dereham and 20 miles (32 km) west of Norwich.

The civil parish has an area of 6.64 km^{2} (2.56 sq mi) and at the 2001 census had a population of 677 in 290 households, the population increasing to 722 in 340 households at the 2011 Census. For the purposes of local government, the parish falls within the district of Breckland.

Yaxham Windmill, which includes the original tower dating from 1860, has been converted for commercial and residential use.

St Peter's Church is one of 124 existing round-tower churches in Norfolk. There is an Evangelical Congregational church in Clint Green. The village is home to Yaxham CE VA Primary School.

Yaxham railway station in the village is on the Mid-Norfolk Railway, a heritage railway running between the market towns of Wymondham and Dereham. Yaxham Light Railway is adjacent to the railway station.

== Notable people ==
- John Johnson, Rector of Yaxham 1800 to 1833

== See also ==
- HMS Yaxham, a Ham class minesweeper
