= Bedingham =

Village in Norfolk, England

Coordinates: 52.483°N 1.367°E

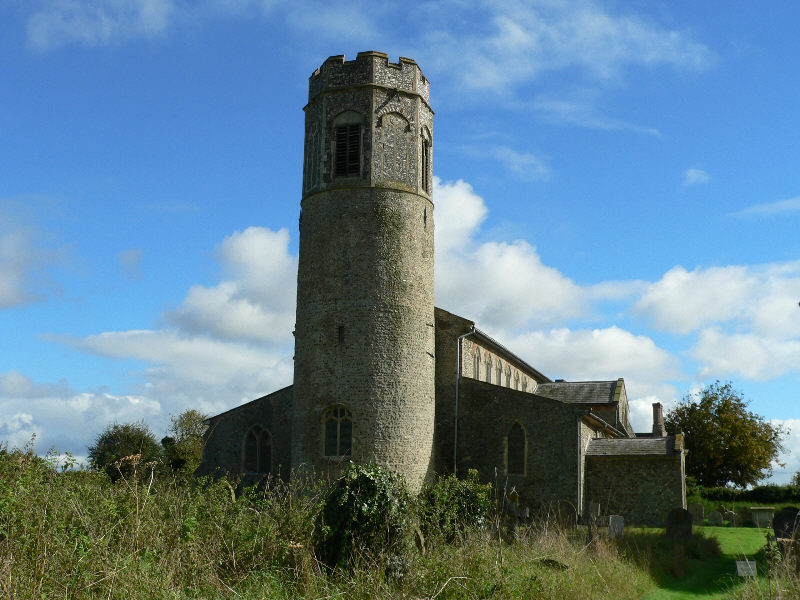
- St Andrew's Church

- Location within Norfolk
- Area: 5.52 km^{2} (2.13 sq mi)
- Population: 221 (2011)
  - Density: 40/km^{2} (100/sq mi)
- Civil parish: Bedingham
- District: South Norfolk
- Shire county: Norfolk
- Region: East
- Country: England
- Sovereign state: United Kingdom
- Post town: BUNGAY
- Postcode district: NR35
- Dialling code: 01508
- Police: Norfolk
- Fire: Norfolk
- Ambulance: East of England

Bedingham is a village and civil parish in the South Norfolk district of Norfolk, England, about 11 miles (18 km) south of Norwich. According to the 2001 census it had a population of 216, increasing to 221 at the 2011 census.

The church of Bedingham St Andrew is one of 124 existing round-tower churches in Norfolk.
