= Ashmanhaugh =

Village in Norfolk, England

Coordinates: 52.735°N 1.420°E

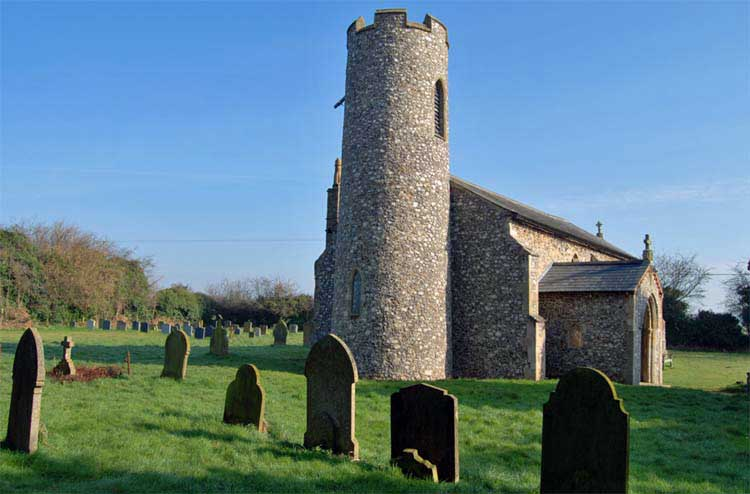
- Ashmanhaugh St Swithin's Church

- Location within Norfolk
- Area: 4.82 km^{2} (1.86 sq mi)
- Population: 189 {2011}
  - Density: 39/km^{2} (100/sq mi)
- OS grid reference: TG310208
- Shire county: Norfolk
- Region: East
- Country: England
- Sovereign state: United Kingdom
- Post town: NORWICH
- Postcode district: NR12
- Police: Norfolk
- Fire: Norfolk
- Ambulance: East of England

Ashmanhaugh is a village and civil parish in the English county of Norfolk, located around 20 miles (32 km) north-east of Norwich. Apart from Ashmanhaugh village, the parish also includes Beeston St Lawrence, which was a separate parish until 1935.

== Geography ==
The civil parish has an area of 4.82 square kilometres (1.86 sq mi) and in the 2001 census had a population of 197 in 74 households, the population falling to 189 at the 2011 census. For the purposes of local government, the parish falls within the district of North Norfolk.

The churches of Ashmanhaugh St Swithin and Beeston St Lawrence are two of 124 existing round-tower churches in Norfolk.
