= Louise Anne Lobin =

French miniature painter

Louise Anne Lobin was a French miniature painter. She was born Louise Anne Florence in Paris, and went on to marry the painter and glass artist Lucien-Léopold Lobin. She exhibited her work at the 1874, 1875, 1876, 1888, 1889 and 1890 Paris Salons.
