= Forncett =

Civil parish in Norfolk, England

Coordinates: 52.49059°N 1.18836°E

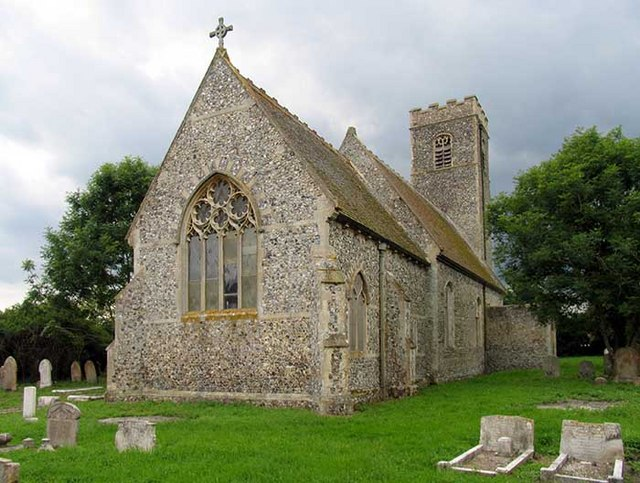
- St Mary's Church, Forncett St Mary

- Location within Norfolk
- Area: 10.76 km^{2} (4.15 sq mi)
- Population: 1,126 (2011)
  - Density: 105/km^{2} (270/sq mi)
- OS grid reference: TM165928
- Civil parish: Forncett
- District: South Norfolk
- Shire county: Norfolk
- Region: East
- Country: England
- Sovereign state: United Kingdom
- Post town: NORWICH
- Postcode district: NR16
- Dialling code: 01508
- Police: Norfolk
- Fire: Norfolk
- Ambulance: East of England
- UK Parliament: Waveney Valley

Forncett is a civil parish in the English county of Norfolk. It covers an area of 10.76 km^{2} (4.15 sq mi) and had a population of 1,000 in 381 households at the 2001 census, increasing to 1,126 at the 2011 census. For the purposes of local government, it falls within the district of South Norfolk.

It includes the villages of Forncett St Peter, Forncett St Mary and Forncett End, and the location of Bustard's Green.

== Governance ==
An electoral ward in the same name exists. This ward stretches north to Ashwellthorpe and Fundenhall with a total population at the 2011 Census of 2,701.

== Forncett Industrial Steam Museum ==
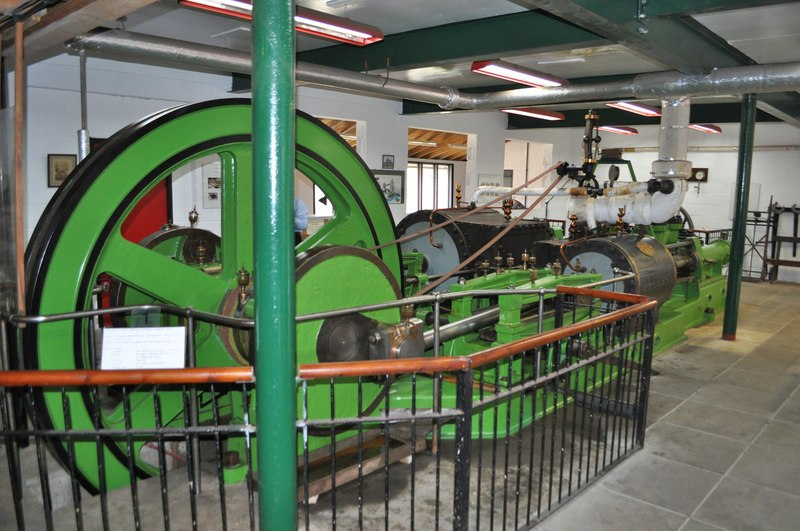
The Tower Bridge engine

The Forncett Industrial Steam Museum houses a collection of large stationary steam engines which are occasionally demonstrated to the public.

Included in the collection is a 150 hp Vickers Armstrong cross-compound pumping engine originally used to open Tower Bridge in London. It was the 'third' steam engine, installed as a wartime precaution against air-raid damage, and was removed to Forncett in 1974. The two original engines remain on display at Tower Bridge.

Other exhibits include a Gimson and Company beam engine, and examples of Corliss engines, vertical engines and Woolf compound engines.

== Norfolk Tank Museum ==
Situated in Station Road, the museum houses an exhibition of tanks, armoured vehicles, and weaponry.

== Notable people ==
- Doreen Carwithen (1922–2003), composer, died there.
- Frances Ellen Colenso, a historian of the Zulu Wars, was born here in 1849.
- Robert Kett (c. 1492 – 7 December 1549), leader of Kett's rebellion, was the son of Forncett native Thomas Kett.
