= Yaxham Windmill =

Windmill in Yaxham, Norfolk, England

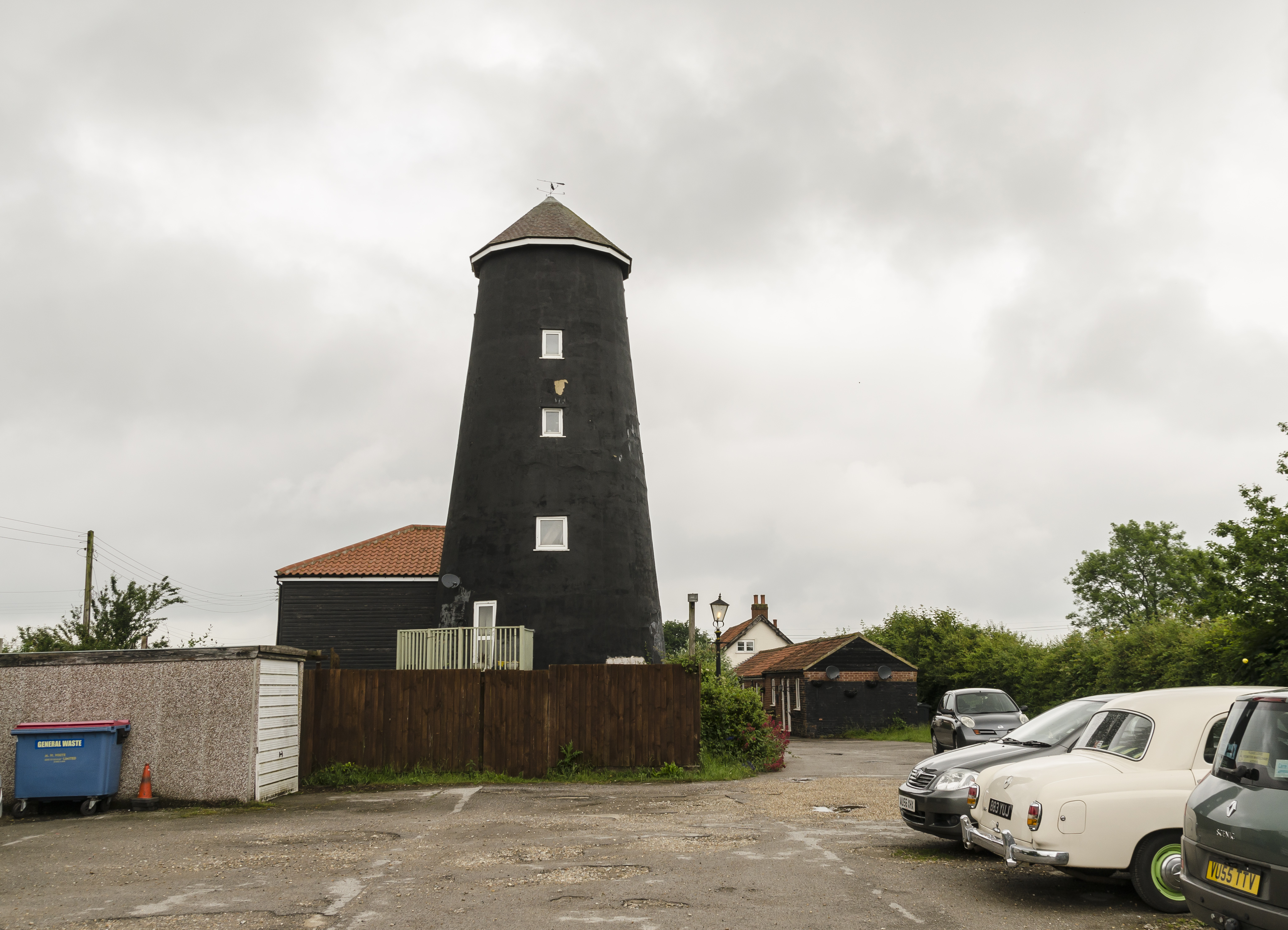
- Yaxham Windmill, June 2016
- Interactive map of Yaxham Windmill

Origin
- Mill name: Yaxham Windmill
- Mill location: Yaxham, Norfolk, England
- Grid reference: TG 0132 1045
- Coordinates: 52°39′15″N 0°58′30″E
- Year built: 1860

Information
- Purpose: Corn mill
- Type: Tower mill
- Storeys: Six storeys
- No. of sails: Four
- Type of sails: Patent sails
- Windshaft: Cast iron
- Winding: Fantail
- Fantail blades: Six
- Auxiliary power: Steam engine, later a diesel engine
- No. of pairs of millstones: Three pairs, plus a fourth pair driven by engine.

Yaxham Windmill is a tower mill at Yaxham, Norfolk, United Kingdom. It was built in 1860 and worked by wind until 1922, then by engine until 1954. The derelict mill was converted in 1996 and has been used as a pub, restaurant and bed and breakfast venue.

== History ==
Yaxham Windmill was built by William Critoph in 1860. It was one of three mills close to each other and all owned by Critoph. One was a post mill which had been built in 1810. The second was a smock mill which originally stood at Paper Street, and was moved in 1857. It was used to saw the timber used in construction of the tower mill which stands today. Photographs show that the smock mill was standing in 1865. The tower mill was struck by lightning in April 1872. A steam engine had been installed as auxiliary power by 1883. The post and tower mills were sold to Thomas William Stebbing Parlett on 1 February 1904. He installed a half sack roller mill. The post mill was demolished c.1917. The steam engine was sold to Dereham Gas Works in 1920 and was replaced by a Crossley diesel engine. The mill ceased working by wind in 1922, when the cap and sails were removed. The Crossley engine was later replaced by an Armstrong engine. The mill was sold to Walter Last in 1932. It ceased working in 1940 and was stripped of its machinery.

Milling continued using the engine driven stones until 1954, the mill subsequently being used as a store by Walter Last Ltd. In October 1996, the refurbished mill opened as a pub. In 2003, the mill was converted to residential use. In 2006, it was in use as a restaurant. In 2012, it was being used as bed and breakfast accommodation.

== Description ==
Yaxham Mill is a six storey tower mill. The tower is 48 feet 0 inches (14.63 m) tall. It is 20 feet 0 inches (6.10 m) diameter at ground floor level. It had an ogee cap with petticoat and gallery. Four double Patent sails were carried on a cast iron windshaft. The sails had ten bays of three shutters. The mill was winded by a six-bladed fantail. The windshaft carried a wooden clasp arm brake wheel. This drove a wooden wallower at the top of the cast iron upright shaft. Three pairs of millstones were driven underdrift. A fourth pair was driven by auxiliary power.
