= Hammarlunda Church =

- Hammarlunda kyrka
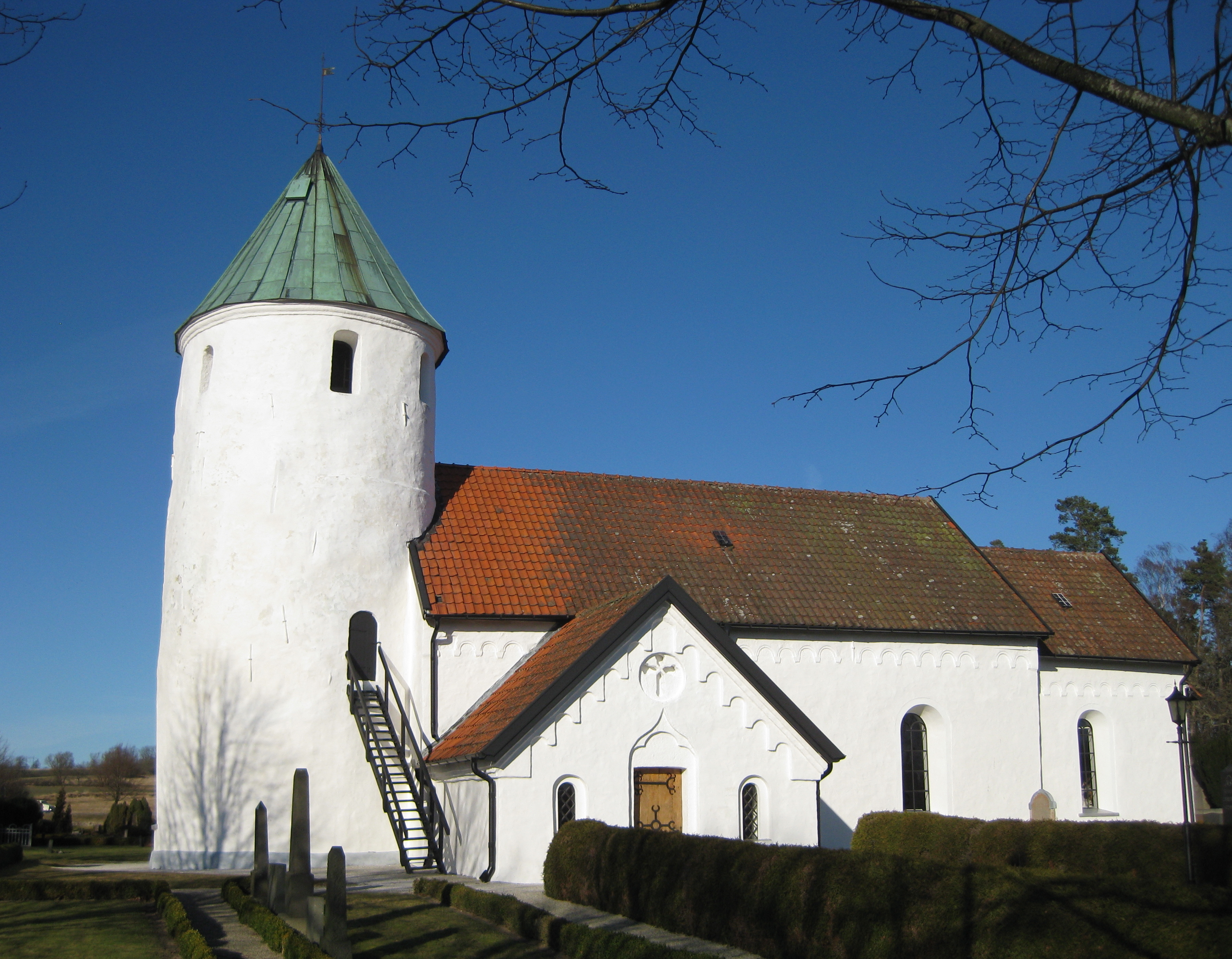
- Hammarlunda Church

- Location within Skåne Location within Sweden
- 55°44′13″N 13°26′16″E
- Country: Sweden
- Denomination: Church of Sweden

Hammarlunda Church (Swedish: Hammarlunda kyrka) is a medieval Lutheran church in the province of Scania, Sweden. It belongs to the Diocese of Lund.

== History and architecture ==
The presently visible stone church was built at the end of the 12th century, but preceded by two stave churches on the same location. The remains of these were discovered during a renovation of the church in 1960. The oldest part of the presently visible church is the nave. The round tower was built slightly later than the rest of the church. Hammarlunda Church is one of only four churches in the province of Scania with such a round tower, the others being Bollerup, Blentarp and Hammarlöv. The shape of the tower indicates that it originally also served a defensive purpose. Under the base of the tower, the graves of a man in his fifties, a woman and a child were found during a renovation in 1965. These graves are possibly those of the family of the founder of the church. The church is Romanesque in style, and largely unchanged since the Middle Ages. In the 1880s, plans were made to enlarge the church but the congregation failed to raise enough money to execute the plans. It has a rectangular nave, a shorter and lower choir and an apse.

== Fittings ==
Several of the church fittings are original, and among these the baptismal font is the oldest. It dates from the time of the church's construction and is made of sandstone. The church has two chalices, one carved from oak wood and one made of silver and donated to the church in 1820 by Jacob De la Gardie, owner of nearby Löberöd Castle. All the church silver was stolen in 1808, and as a new chalice was only given to the church by De la Gardie in 1820, the wooden chalice was used until then. The church has two bells, made in 1898 and 1924 respectively but replacing two older church bells, one of which is today on display at the Historical Museum at Lund University in Lund. Before the Reformation, the church was dedicated to Saint Anne and a local pilgrimage site.
