= Lucien-Léopold Lobin =

French stained glass artist and painter

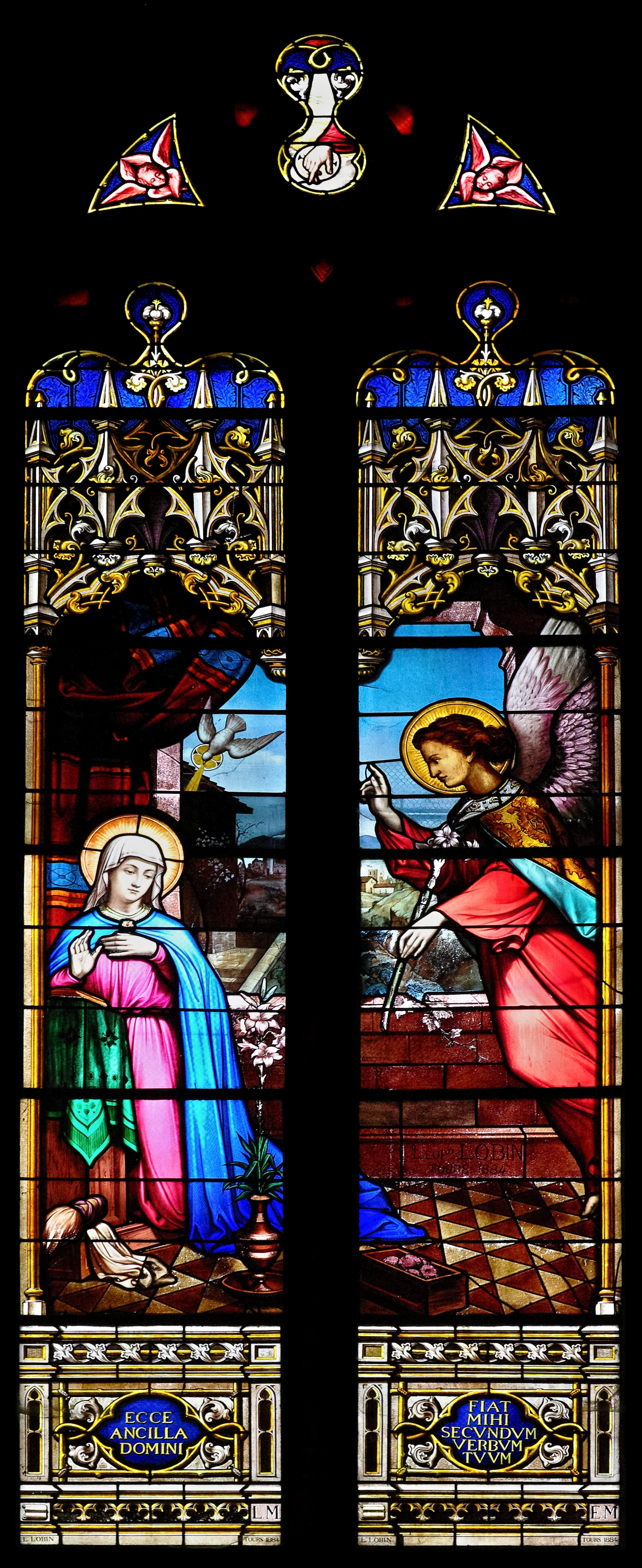
Stained glass window (1884) by Lucien-Leopold Lobin, depicting the Annunciation. Church of Saint-André, Angoulême, France

Lucien-Léopold Lobin (March 26, 1837 – 1892) was a French stained glass artist and painter. Lobin was a student of H. Flandrin.

Lucien worked under his father Julien-Léopold Lobin at the family glass works and studio in Tours, France. Together, they restored all of the 13th century stained glass in the Tours Cathedral. Lobin took over the company after his father's death. He was married to the French miniature painter Louise Anne Lobin.

As a painter, he exhibited in the 1859 Salon. His stained glass and mural work can be found in churches in Wales, Ireland and France.

== List of Works ==
=== England ===
- St. Nicholas' Church, West Lexham, Norfolk

== Gallery ==
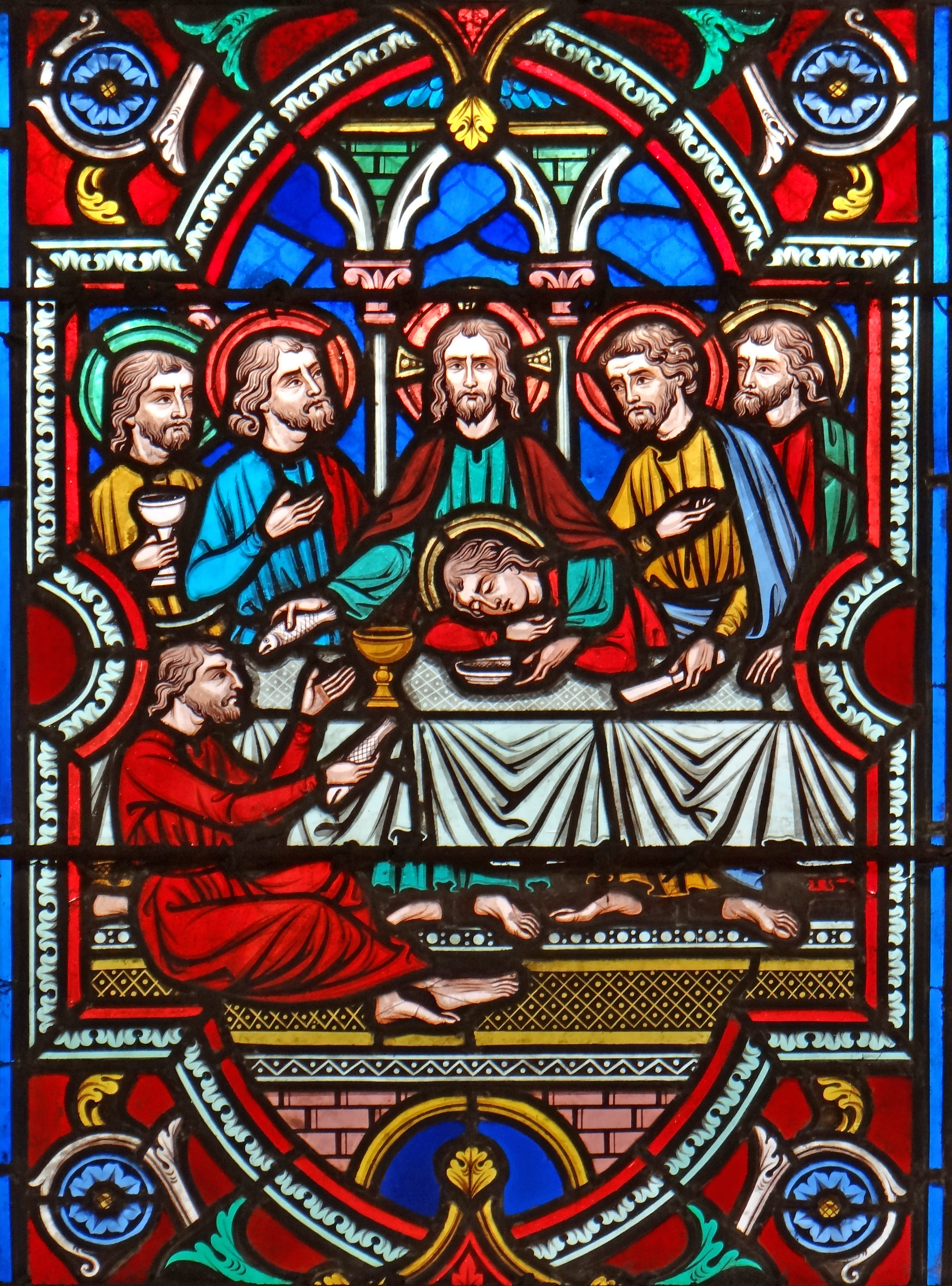
Marmade - Église Notre-Dame de Marmande

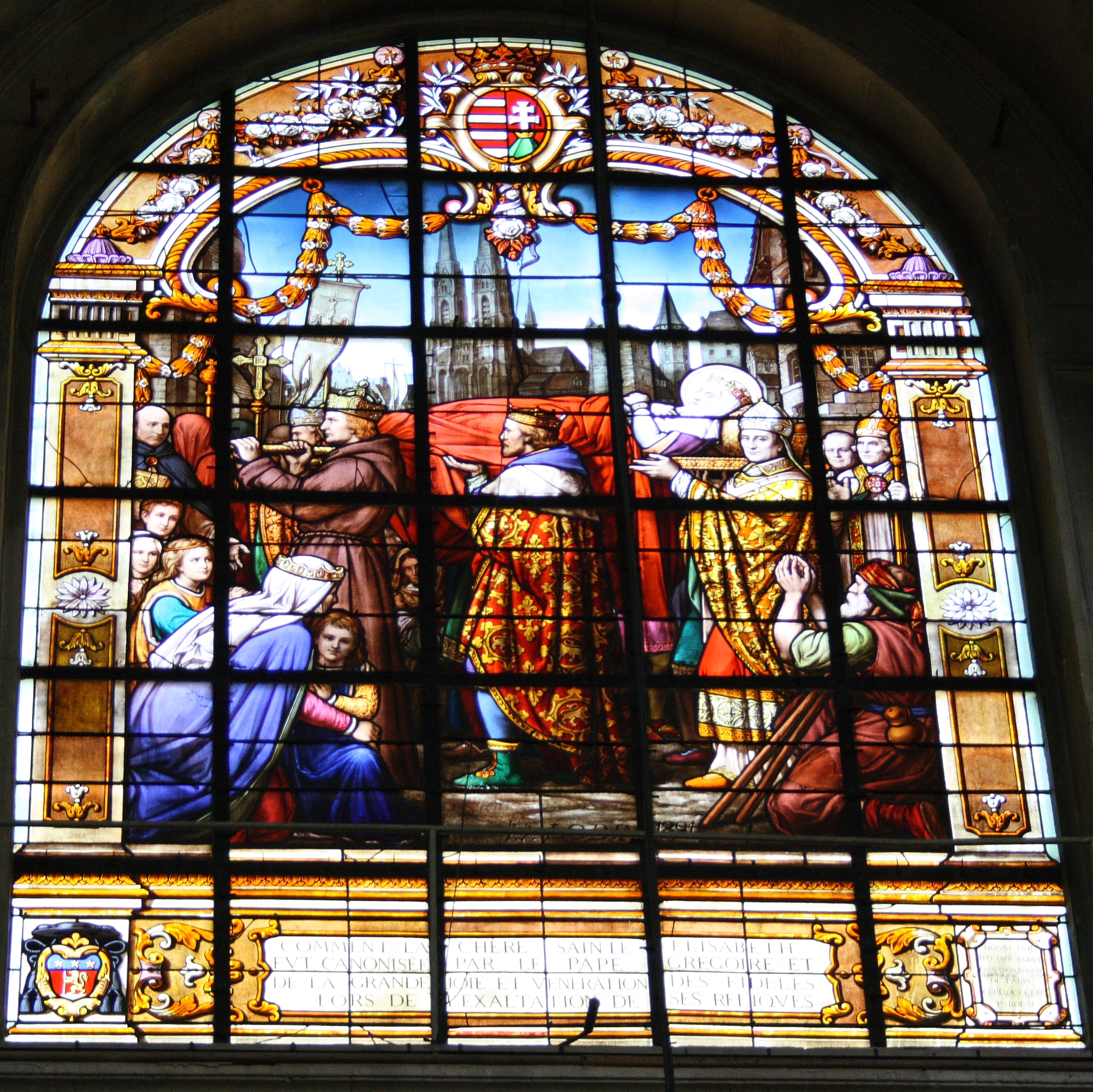
Paris Sainte-Élisabeth-de-Hongrie

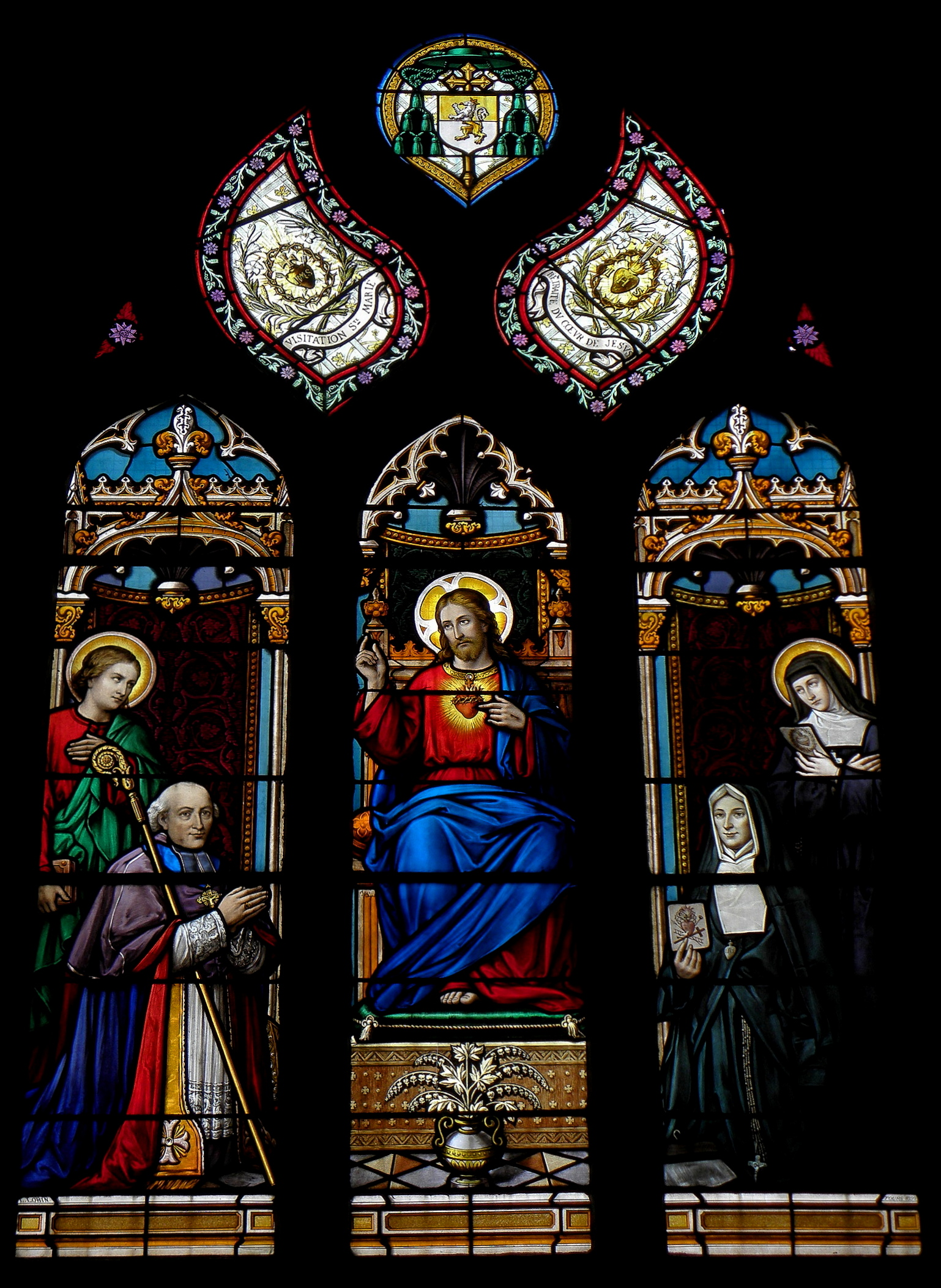
Église Saint-Cuffan

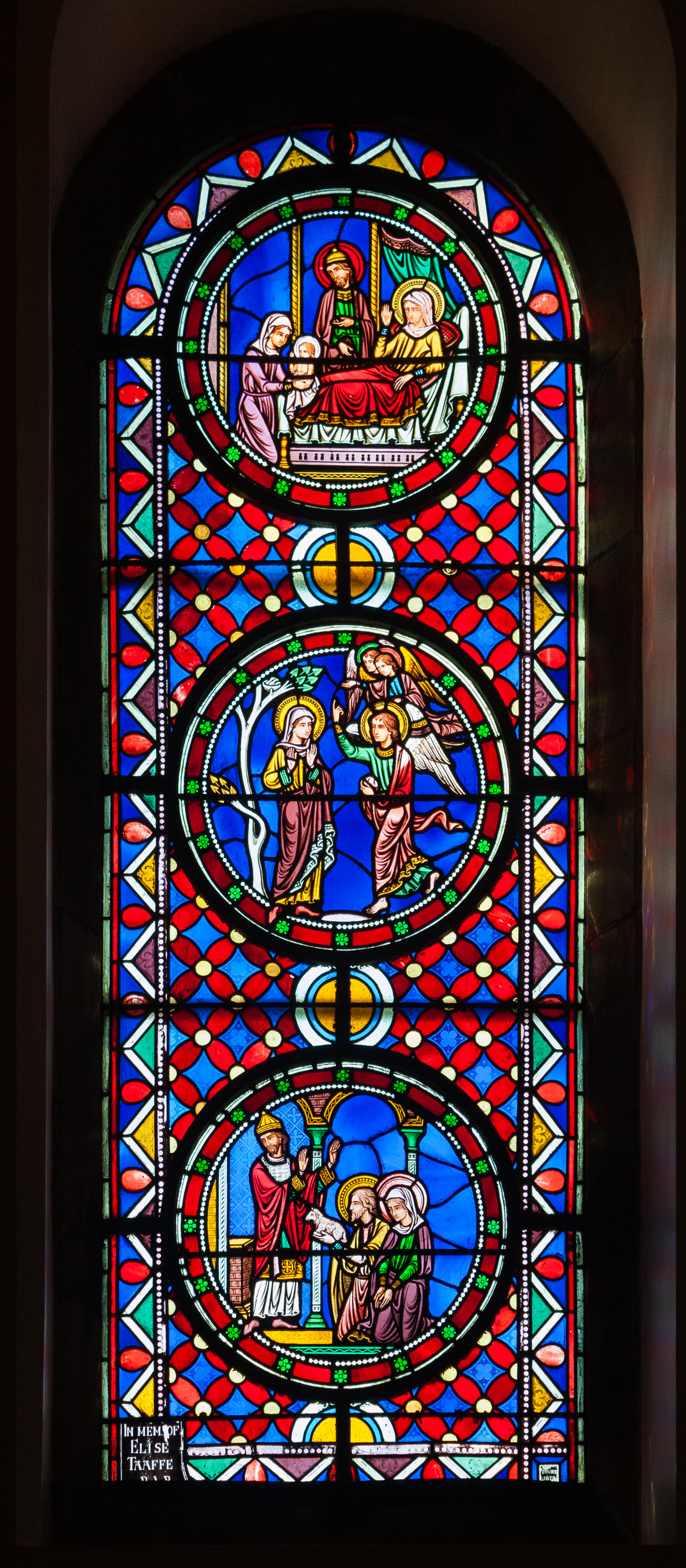
Sligo Cathedral of the Immaculate Conception, Birth of the Virgin Mary
