= East Lexham =

Village in Norfolk, England

Coordinates: 52.720019°N 0.752478°E

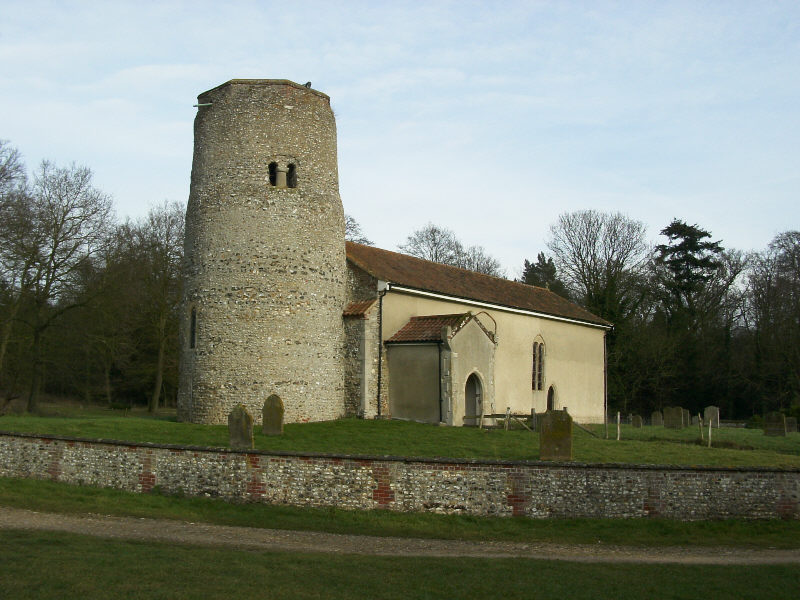
- St. Andrew's Church, East Lexham

- Location within Norfolk
- OS grid reference: TF840120
  - London: 106 miles (171 km)
- Civil parish: Lexham
- District: Breckland
- Shire county: Norfolk
- Region: East
- Country: England
- Sovereign state: United Kingdom
- Post town: KING'S LYNN
- Postcode district: PE32
- Dialling code: 01328
- Police: Norfolk
- Fire: Norfolk
- Ambulance: East of England
- UK Parliament: Mid Norfolk

East Lexham is a village and former civil parish, now in the parish of Lexham, in the Breckland district, in the English county of Norfolk.

East Lexham is located 7.7 miles (12.4 km) north of Swaffham and 30.1 miles (48.4 km) west-north-west of Norwich.

== History ==
East Lexham's name is of Anglo-Saxon origin and derives from the Old English for 'leech homestead', likely in the sense of a physician.

In the Domesday Book, East and West Lexham are listed together as a settlement of 45 households in the hundred of Launditch. In 1086, the village was divided between the East Anglian estates of William de Warenne and Ralph de Beaufour.

Lexham Hall was built in 1660 and was re-modelled twice in the Eighteenth Century. The building was used by the Royal Army Service Corps during the Second World War but burnt down in 1950, being restored again in 1972. The modern gardens were designed by Dame Sylvia Crowe which are open for charity events.

On 1 April 1935 the parish was abolished and to form Lexham.

== Geography ==
In 1931, the parish had a population of 160. This was the last time separate population statistics were collected for the village as in 1935, the parish was merged with West Lexham.

East Lexham stands on the course of the River Nar

== St. Andrew's Church ==
East Lexham's parish church is dedicated to Saint Andrew and is one of Norfolk's 124 remaining Anglo-Saxon round-tower churches. St. Andrew's has been dated to the Eleventh Century with a significant restoration effort made in the late-Nineteenth Century. The church possesses good examples of Nineteenth Century stained glass including one depiction of Saint Michael and the dragon installed by James Powell and Sons. Furthermore, the church features examples of artwork by Richard Foster depicting the Nativity, Saint Andrew as a fisherman and the Day of Judgement.

Furthermore, St. Andrew's is thought to be one of the oldest churches in England. Pevsner dates the building easily to the time of the Anglo-Saxons with mound the church stands on providing evidence of the site of earlier Pagan worship, with the church being taken over by the Christians in the Seventh Century. The original church may well have been built of wood or wattle and daub. The most recent research has also suggested, like Pevsner, that the current church was built by Saxons but with a Norman influence. This conclusion has been made due to the style and design of the three belfry openings which have all been constructed differently. The east opening has a unique stone frame cut out to form a maltese cross. Within the belfry is one bell which has a Latin inscription which translates to I am called the bell of Virgin exalted Mary, the bell is thought to have been cast by Brasyers of Norwich in the 15th century.

== Transport ==
The village lies about 1.5 miles (2.4 km) east of the A1065 Mildenhall to Fakenham road. The nearest railway station is at King's Lynn for the Fen Line which runs between King's Lynn and Cambridge. The nearest airport is Norwich International Airport.

== Notable residents ==
- Richard Foster (b. 1945), painter, born in East Lexham

== Governance ==
East Lexham is part of the electoral ward of Launditch for local elections and is part of the district of Breckland.

The village's national constituency is Mid Norfolk which has been represented by the Conservative's George Freeman MP since 2010.

== War memorial ==
East Lexham's war memorial takes the form of an ornate plaque depicting Saint Michael and the Dragon, located inside St. Andrew's Church. The memorial lists the following names for the First World War:

Rank	Name	Unit	Date of death	Burial
A/Bdr.	Ernest W. Seaman	Machine Gun Corps	21 Sep. 1916	St. Andrew's Churchyard
LCpl.	Harry Nice MM	7th Bn., Norfolk Regiment	26 Mar. 1918	Pozieres Memorial
Pte.	Arthur J. Sculpher	3rd Bn., Coldstream Guards	12 Apr. 1918	Ploegsteert Memorial
Pte.	William Crisp	11th Bn., Essex Regiment	28 Sep. 1916	Thiepval Memorial
Pte.	George W. R. Butcher	1/5th Bn., Norfolk Regiment	28 Aug. 1915	Helles Memorial
Pte.	Charles W. Wilgress	6th Bn., Queen's Royal Regiment	27 Nov. 1916	Wailly Orchard Cemetery
