= St Andrew's Church, Bedingham =

Church of St Andrew
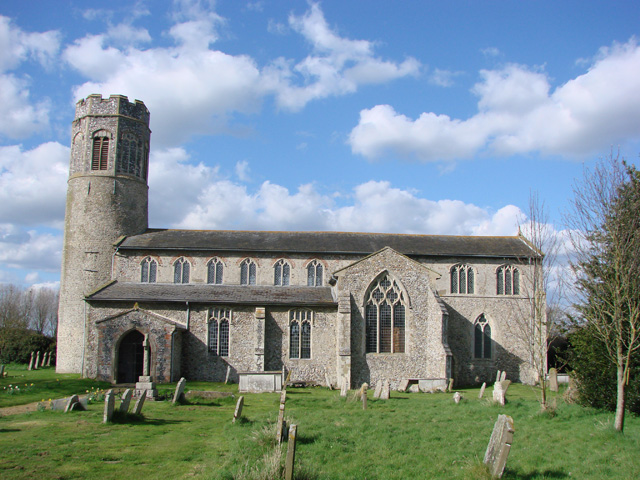
- Church of St Andrew
- 52°29′26.16″N 1°21′52.2″E
- OS grid reference: TM 28511 93397
- Location: Bedingham, Norfolk
- Country: England
- Denomination: Church of England
- Website: hempnallgroup.co.uk

Architecture
- Heritage designation: Grade I
- Designated: 4 September 1960

Administration
- Diocese: Norwich

St Andrew's Church is an Anglican church in Bedingham in Norfolk, England. It is in the Hempnall group of parishes and in the Diocese of Norwich. It is a round-tower church, dating mostly from the medieval period. The building is Grade I listed.

== History and description ==
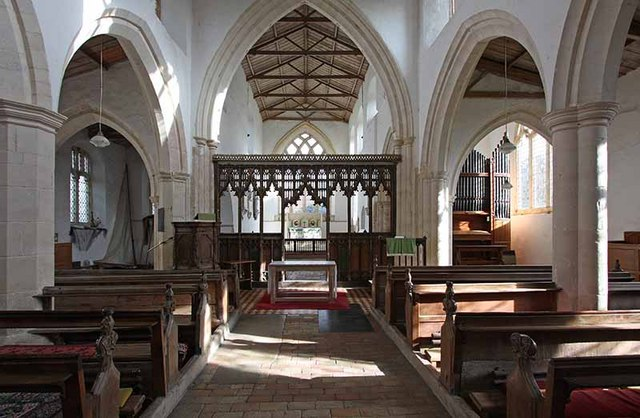
Looking towards the rood screen and the chancel

The church is built of flint with limestone dressings. It is a large building, perhaps because Walsingham Priory Manor, held by Walsingham Priory from 1318 until the Dissolution of the Monasteries, was one of the two manors in the parish. The other manor was Bigod's Manor, held by the Stone family from the mid-16th to the 19th century. There were once two churches in the churchyard; foundations remain of St Mary's church.

The gateway to the church was made narrower in the 19th century, to prevent the lord of the manor from driving his carriage up to the porch when attending services.

The earliest part of the church is the lower part of the tower, which is late Saxon or early Norman; above this is a 15th-century octagonal belfry, where there are four louvred bell-openings alternating with four panels with tracery, and a castellated parapet. The rest of the building dates mostly from the 13th and 14th centuries, with 15th-century additions.

=== Interior ===
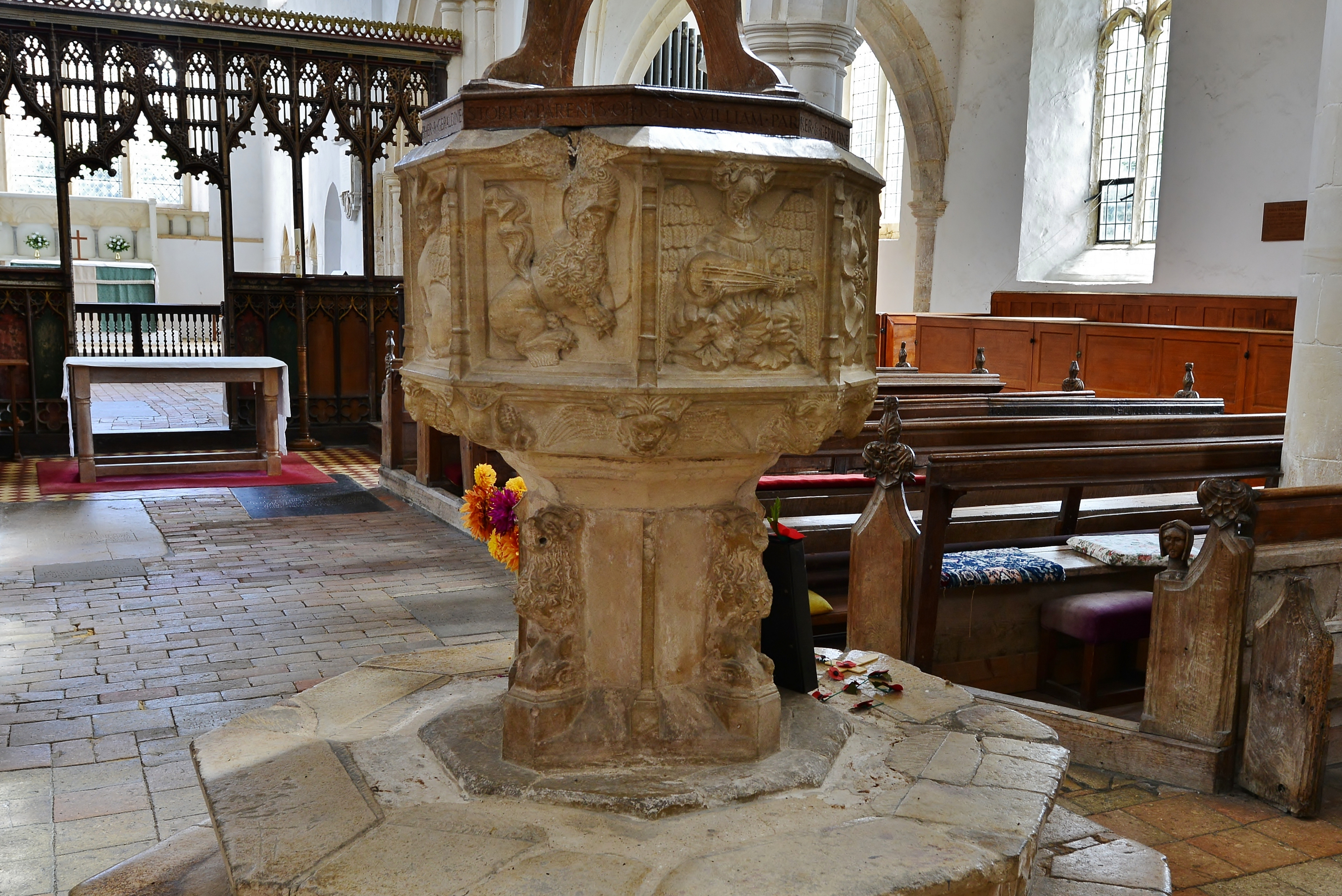
The font

The nave has 14th-century arcades, and north and south aisles; the pillars of the arches are octagonal in the north, and quatrefoil in the south, which may be earlier. There is a clerestory with 15th-century windows; the clerestory windows extend over the chancel, providing much light. The chancel's east window has tracery of about 1300.

The rood screen, with fine tracery in the panels and carved brattishing along the top, dates from the 15th century. The bench ends have 15th-century carvings. The 15th-century octagonal font has seated lions around the stem, and the symbols of the four evangelists around the bowl. There are monuments to the Stone family on the north wall of the chancel and on floor slabs in the north and south aisles.

There is a south chapel, of the 14th century. The south porch is 15th-century.

There are five bells, the oldest dating from about 1520. Theye cannot be rung, as the 15th-century oak frame is no longer strong enough.
