= St Peter's Church, Yaxham =

Church of St Peter
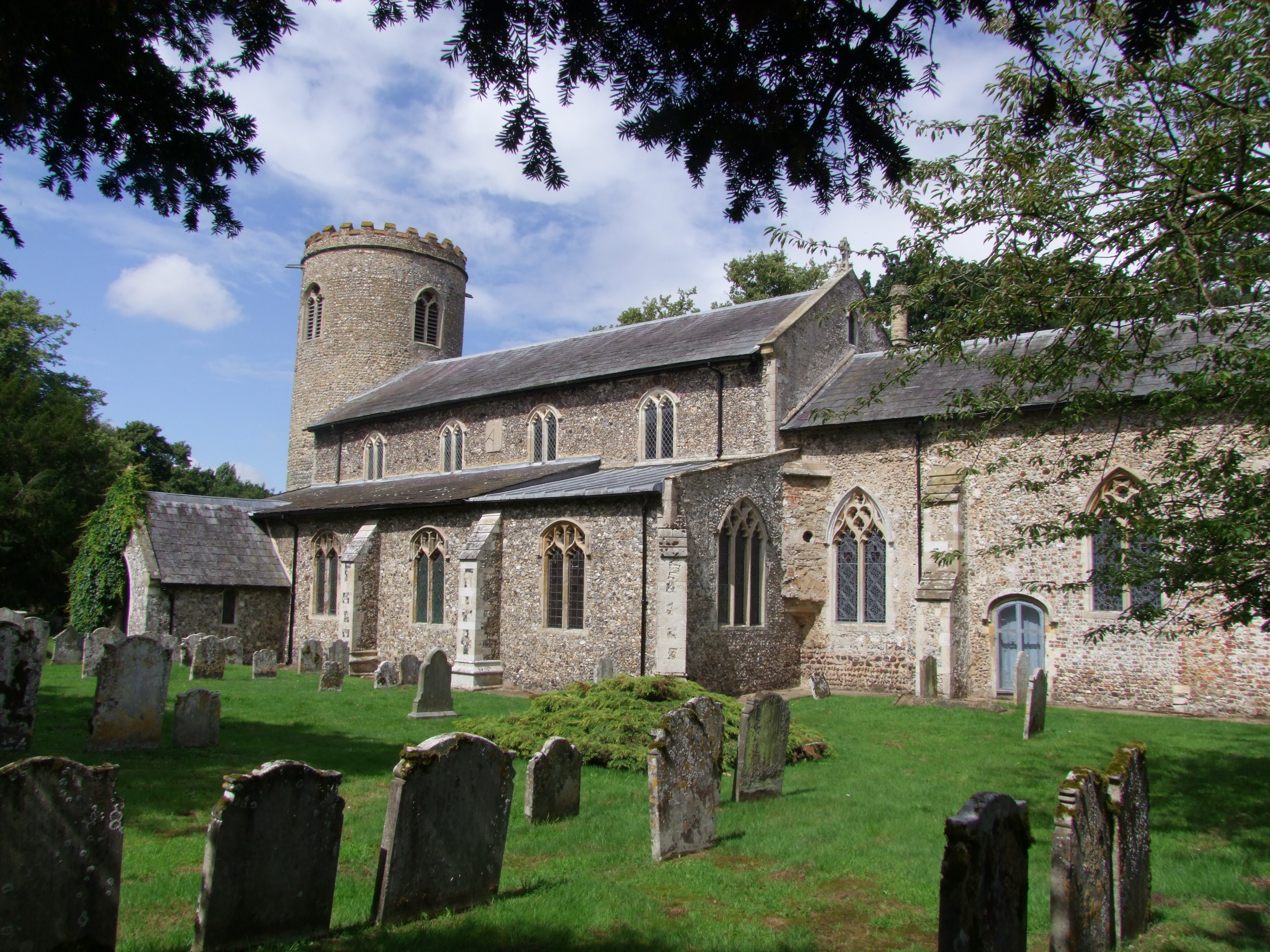
- Church of St Peter
- 52°39′24.84″N 0°57′59.58″E
- OS grid reference: TG 00740 10710
- Location: Yaxham, Norfolk
- Country: England
- Denomination: Church of England
- Website: yaxham.com/church/

Architecture
- Heritage designation: Grade I
- Designated: 29 May 1960

Administration
- Diocese: Norwich

St Peter's Church is the parish church of Yaxham in Norfolk, England, in the benefice of Mattishall and the Tudd Valley, and in the Diocese of Norwich. It is a round-tower church, dating mostly from the medieval period. The building is Grade I listed.

== History and description ==
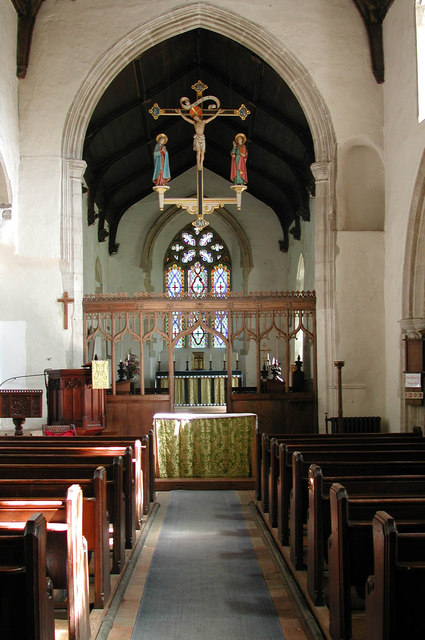
Looking towards the chancel

The earliest part of the church is the banding of carstone at the base of the tower, which probably predates the Norman conquest. The rest of the tower dates from the late 11th or early 12th century, with the upper part dating from the 14th century, with four bell-openings, each of two lights, and a post-medieval crenellated parapet. Most of the rest of the building is of the 14th and 15th centuries. There is a nave with a south aisle and four clerestory windows, and a chancel. There is a late-medieval south porch.

=== Interior ===
The 14th-century south arcade has four bays, with alternating foiled and octagonal piers. The octagonal font, carved with blind tracery and with crocketted finials, is of the 15th century. There is a medieval piscina in the south aisle, and a later piscina in the chancel.

There was restoration in the 19th century; the stained-glass windows are from this period. The ends of the pews, of the 19th or 20th century, are decorated in the south aisle with carvings of birds and animals.
