= Bollerup Church =

- Bollerups kyrka
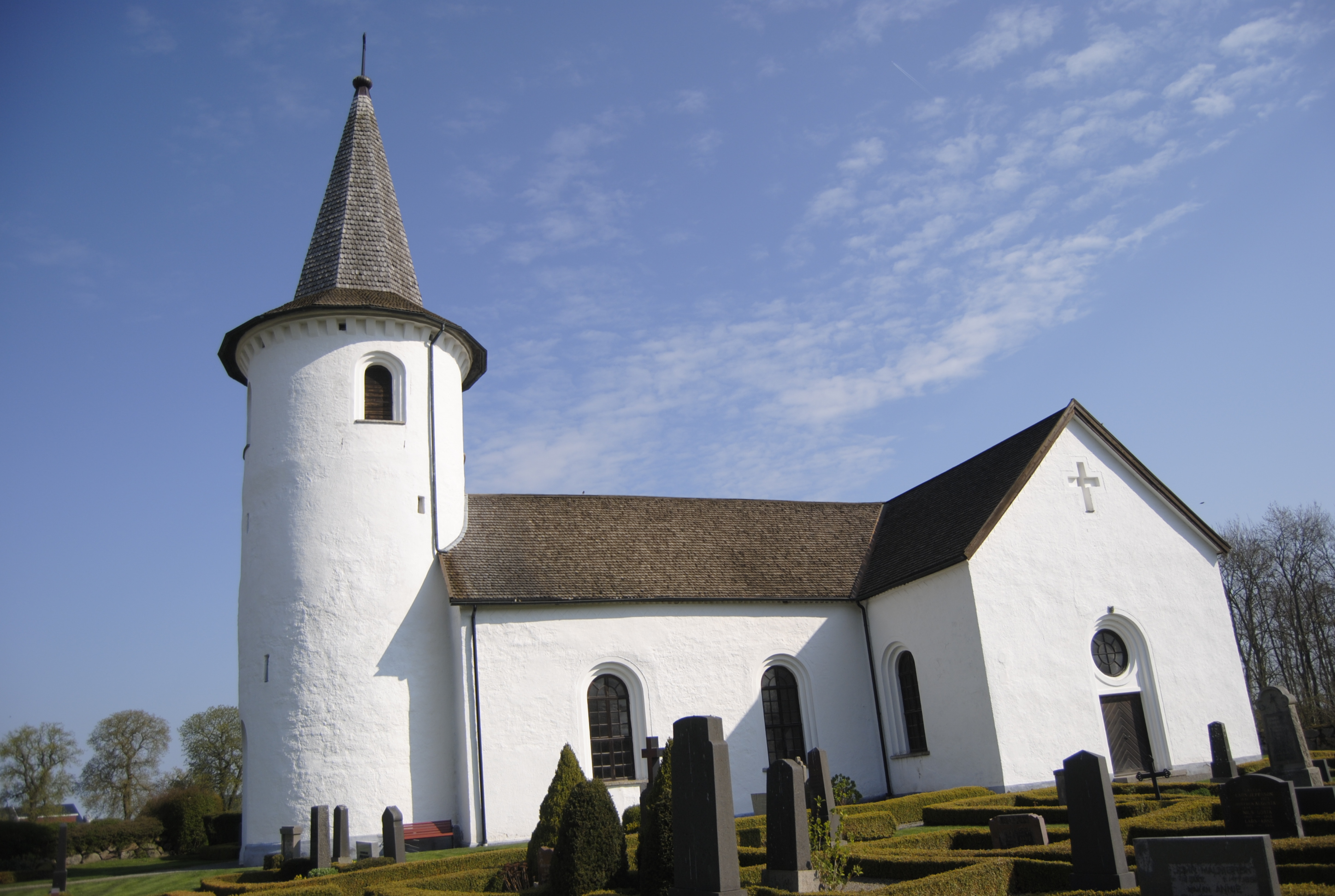
- Bollerup Church

- 55°29′33″N 14°02′51″E
- Country: Sweden
- Denomination: Church of Sweden

Administration
- Diocese: Lund

Bollerup Church (Swedish: Bollerups kyrka) is a medieval Lutheran church located some 7 km (4 mi) southwest of Tomelilla in southern Sweden, in the close vicinity of Bollerup Castle. It belongs to the Diocese of Lund of the Church of Sweden.

== History and architecture ==
The church was originally dedicated to St Peter. The west end of the church and its round tower, both in limestone, were probably built in the 12th century at the same time as nearby Bollerup Castle. It is one of four surviving churches with round towers in Scania, the others being Blentarp, Hammarlunda and Hammarlöv. Unlike the church itself, the tower has a high socle. The original north and south doors no longer exist. In 1649, Ida Skeek til Bollerup built a burial chapel to the east for the Rantzau family. A transept was added in 1869.

== Interior ==
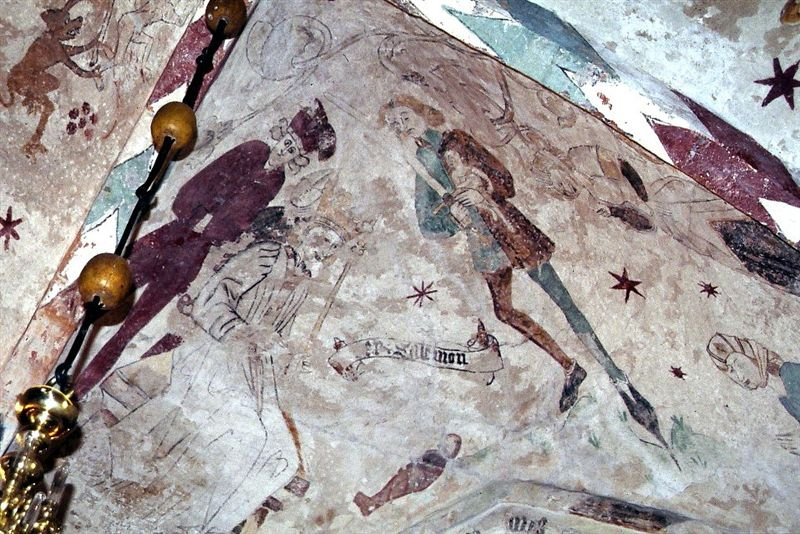
Murals depicting the Judgment of Solomon

The nave vaulting dates from the first half of the 15th century. The magnificent altarpiece and the pulpit, both in the auricular style, were probably donated by Ida Skeel when the burial chapel was added. The Romanesque limestone font (c. 1200) with a bowl decorated with arches might be the work of Stonemaster Mårten.

== Murals ==
Discovered in 1955 by C.O. Svenson after being limewashed for centuries, the murals were painted in 1476 when Barbara Brahe returned from Rome with King Christian I after an audience with Pope Sixtus IV. She can be seen in the painting on the northeastern segment of the vault while her son Oluf Stigsen Krognos appears on the southwestern side. The inscription reads (translated): "In the year AD 1476 the honourable lady Barbara Brahe and her son Oluf Stigsen had this whole church restored, bells hung in the tower and the interior decorated and bought a new Bible and prayer book. Pray for us." The work of the unknown artist, possibly brought back from Italy by Barbara Brahe, is unlike other murals in the area.

The murals also depict Christ seated on a rainbow, Mary, John the Baptist with angels and the dead rising from the grave. Hell is shown with devils tormenting a variety of sinners including a king. In the Judgment of Solomon, Solomon sits on his throne with the child on the floor, a soldier preparing to cut the living child with his sword. Another scene show St. Peter welcoming the redeemed to his heavenly castle. There are also scenes of the Nativity.

== See also ==
- List of church murals in Sweden

== Bibliography ==
- Åberg, Gustaf (1988). S:t Petri kyrka i Bollerup (in Swedish). Bollerups församling.
- Wenningsted-Torgard, Susanne (1990). Sankt Kristoffer I Bollerup kirke. ICO, 1990, nr. 10106-1348. (in Danish)
