= Bollerup =

Historical building in Tomelilla, Sweden

- Bollerups borg
- Tomelilla Municipality
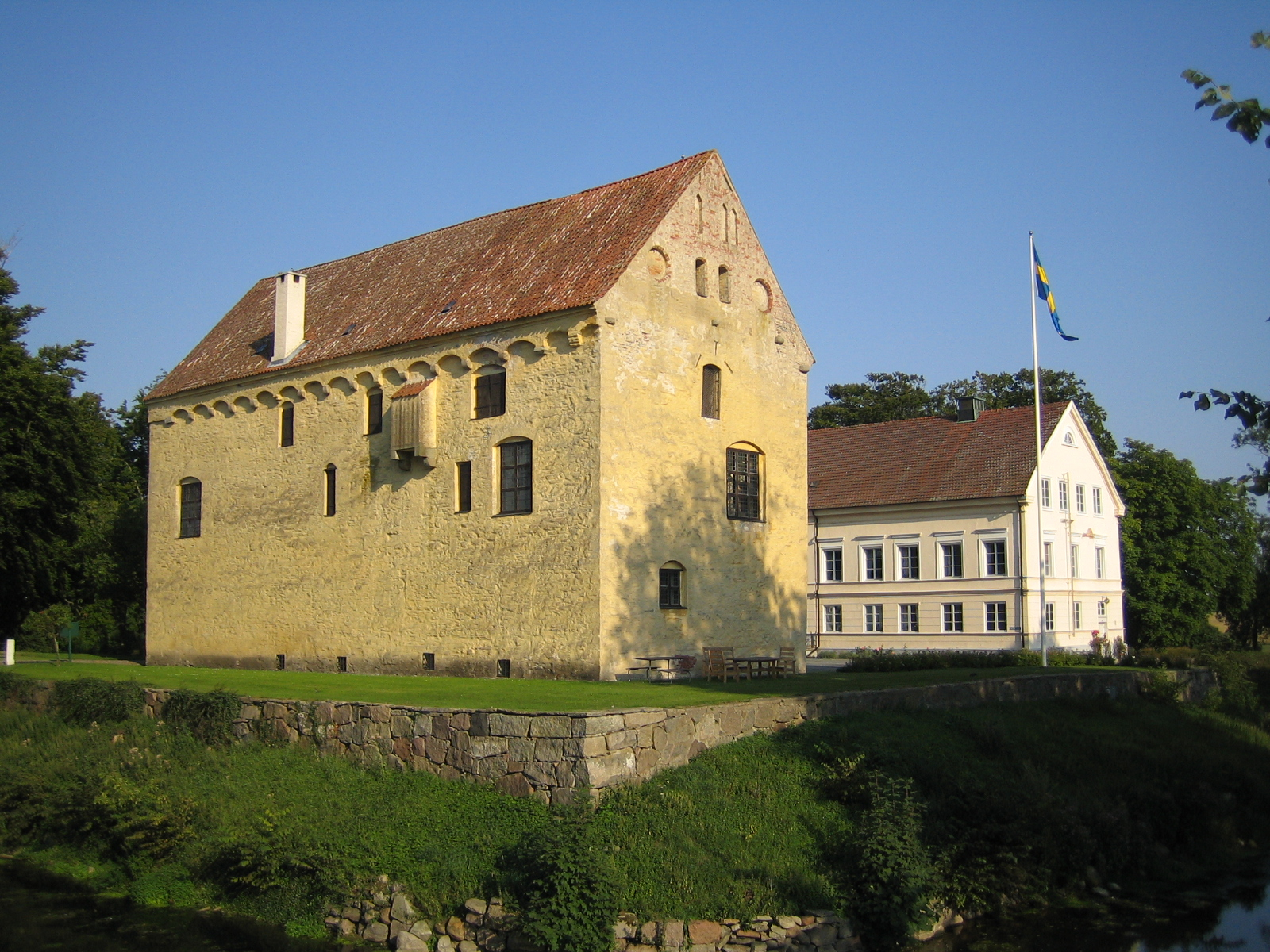
- Bollerup

Site information
- Type: Castle
- Open to the public: Yes

Location
- Scania, Sweden Bollerup (Sweden)
- Coordinates: 55.491389°N 14.045833°E

Site history
- Built: 12th century

Bollerup (Swedish: Bollerups borg) is a castle in Tomelilla Municipality, Scania, in southern Sweden.

== History ==
The castle is mentioned in written sources for the first time in the middle of the 13th century, but is apparently older. The rectangular main stone building is probably the product of the merging of several earlier structures, the most important very possibly a tall keep or tower house. During the Middle Ages the castle was an important estate in the hands of influential noble families, and the castle complex was probably extended with a moat and other defensive works during this time. The castle received its present-day form c. 1460. Bollerup Church located adjacent to the castle is further proof of the early importance of the site.

During an uprising in 1525, the castle was burnt. It was later restored, but a period of decline had inevitably begun for the castle, which is mentioned as being without roof and proper floors a hundred and fifty years later. Later it was converted into a granary and used as such until the mid-20th century, when a restoration was carried out.

Today the castle is part of an upper secondary school specialised in natural resource uses.

== Architecture ==
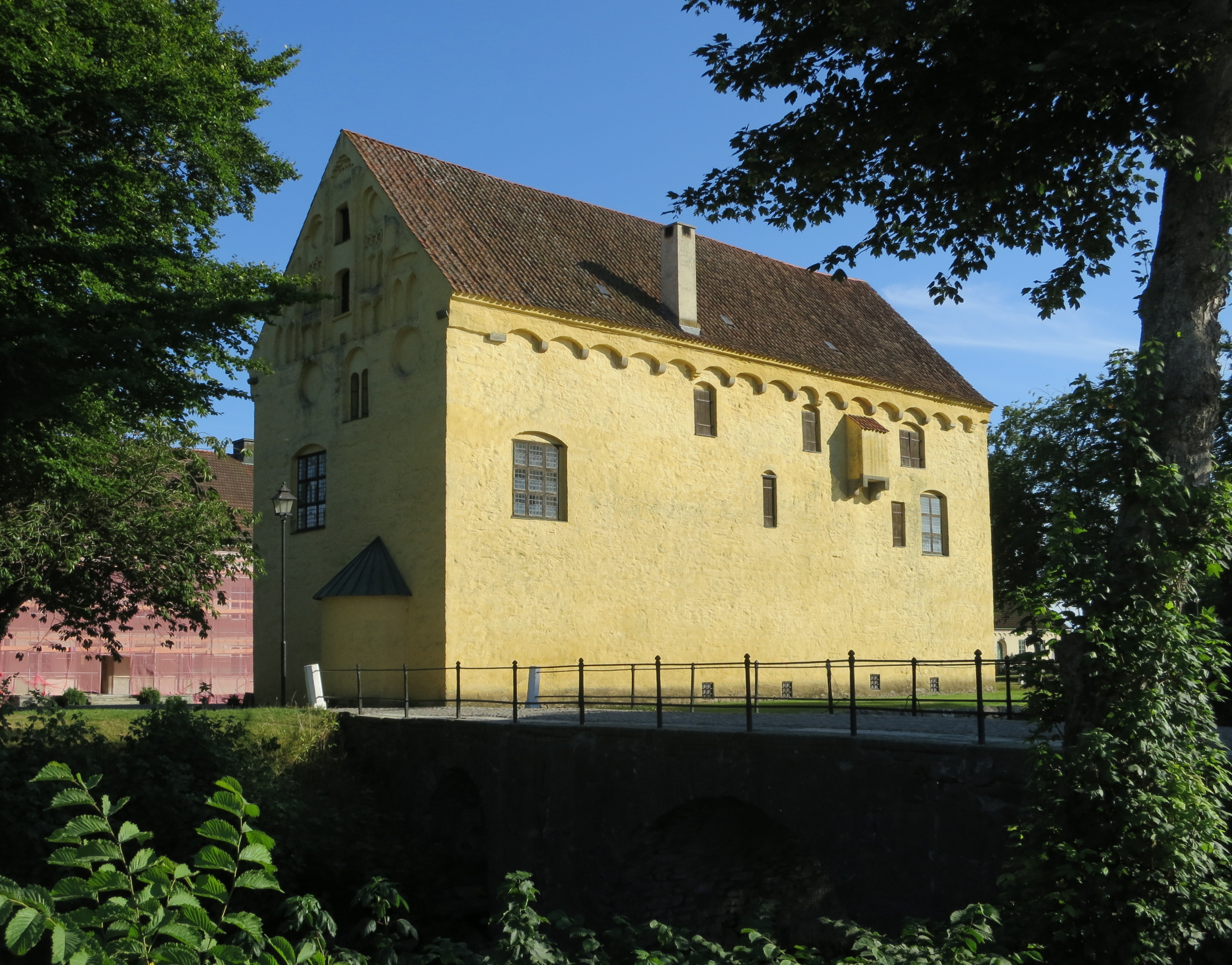
View from across the moat

The façade of the main, castle building reflects its turbulent history and is a mixture of medieval, Gothic elements and later alterations. A frieze running along the edge of the roof on the south façade originally supported battlements with room for archers. Similarly, the castle retains a medieval protruding dansker and traces of several external staircases, as the original castle lacked internal stairs. The façade is decorated with typical Brick Gothic blind arches.

Internally, the castle is characterised by late Gothic and early Renaissance influences. Several large, vaulted rooms supported by granite pillars and decorated with faded frescos have been restored.

Opposite the old castle building is a wing of similar length, built in neoclassical style c. 1850.

Adjacent to the church lies the unusual and noteworthy medieval Bollerup Church.

== See also ==
- List of castles in Sweden
- Bollerup Church
