= Forncett St Mary =

Village in Norfolk, England

Coordinates: 52.500°N 1.189°E

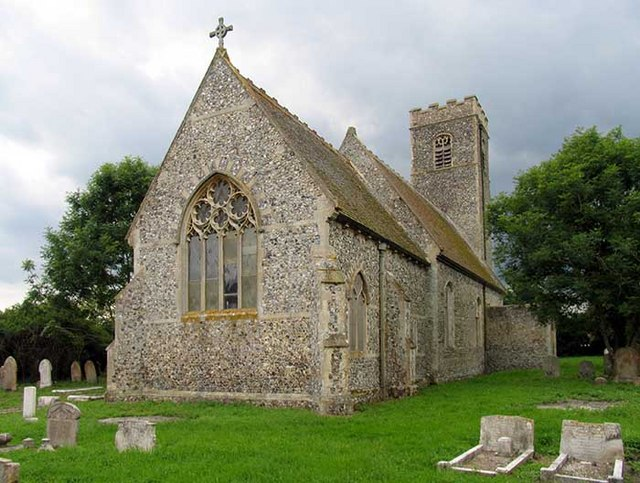
- St. Mary's Church, Forncett St Mary

- Location within Norfolk
- OS grid reference: TM165938
  - London: 88 mi (142 km)
- Civil parish: Forncett
- District: South Norfolk
- Shire county: Norfolk
- Region: East
- Country: England
- Sovereign state: United Kingdom
- Post town: NORWICH
- Postcode district: NR16
- Dialling code: 01508
- Police: Norfolk
- Fire: Norfolk
- Ambulance: East of England
- UK Parliament: South Norfolk

Forncett St Mary is a village and former civil parish, now in the parish of Forncett, in the South Norfolk district, in the English county of Norfolk. The village is located 7.4 miles (11.9 km) east of Attleborough and 10 miles (16 km) south-west of Norwich, close to the course of the River Tas.

== History ==
Forncett St. Mary's name is of mixed Anglo-Saxon and Viking origin and derives from an amalgamation of the Old English and Old Norse for Forni's dwelling or camp, with the epithet of St. Mary to distinguish the village from Forncett St Peter.

In the Domesday Book, Forncett St Mary is listed in the same entry as Forncett St Peter as a settlement of 21 households in the hundred of Depwade. In 1086, the villages formed part of the East Anglian estates of Roger Bigod, Bishop Osbern FitzOsbern and Ulfkil the freeman.

Forncett St Mary and St Peter are believed to have split into separate villages in the fifteenth century as part of boundary changes led by the Church of England. Despite this, the two villages shared a single rector until the mid-nineteenth century.

Forncett Railway Station opened in 1849 as a stop on the Great Eastern Main Line between London Liverpool Street and Norwich. The station was finally closed in 1966 as part of the Beeching Cuts with the nearest station still in operation being Attleborough for Breckland line services.

In 1931 the parish had a population of 153 and on 1 April 1935 the parish was abolished and merged with Forncett St Peter to form "Forncett".

== Geography ==
Population statistics for Forncett St Mary are amalgamated with Forncett St Peter and according to the 2021 census, Forncett has a total population of 1,127 people which demonstrates an increase from the 1,126 people listed in the 2011 census.

== St. Mary's Church ==
Forncett's parish church is dedicated to Saint Mary and dates from the Thirteenth Century. St. Mary's is located within the village on Low Road and has been Grade I listed since 1959.

St. Mary's was restored in the Victorian era but soon fell into disrepair after the parish was merged with Forncett St. Peter. The church is most famous for being the rectory of John Colenso, who, between 1853 and 1883, served as the first Bishop of Natal in modern-day South Africa. After the church fell into disrepair, the Friends of Forncett Church was set up led by local residents, Graham and May Prior. The organisation gathered £500,000 from grants and donations to restore the church to its former glory. In 2012, St. Mary's held its first service in over thirty years conducted by Rev. Alan Winton, Bishop of Thetford.

== Notable residents ==
- Reverend John Colenso- (1814–1883) cleric and mathematician, Rector of Forncett 1846-1853

== Governance ==
Forncett St Mary is part of the electoral ward of Forncett for local elections and is part of the district of South Norfolk.

The village's national constituency is South Norfolk which has been represented by the Labour's Ben Goldsborough MP since 2024.

== War memorial ==
Forncett St. Mary's war memorial takes the form of a marble crucifix atop a hexagonal plinth, located inside St. Mary's Churchyard. The memorial was unveiled in November 1921 and lists the following names for the First World War:

Rank	Name	Unit	Date of death	Burial/Commemoration
Pte.	Walter E. G. Brooks	9th Bn., East Surrey Regiment	24 Aug. 1916	Thiepval Memorial
Pte.	Edward F. Ramm	1st Bn., Essex Regiment	13 Aug. 1915	Helles Memorial
Pte.	George A. Coleman	16th Bn., Middlesex Regiment	28 Feb. 1917	Sailly-Saillisel Cemetery
Pte.	Percival Grey	1st Bn., Norfolk Regiment	28 Sep. 1915	Citadel Cemetery
Pte.	William E. Ludkin	1st Bn., Norfolk Regt.	4 Jun. 1916	Faubourg Cemetery
Pte.	Charles H. Brooks	7th Bn., Norfolk Regt.	14 Oct. 1917	Arras Memorial
Pte.	Herbert Harvey	9th Bn., Norfolk Regt.	1 May 1917	Loos Memorial
Pte.	John W. Sheldrake	9th Bn., Norfolk Regt.	2 Oct. 1917	Maroc Cemetery

The following names were added after the Second World War:

Rank	Name	Unit	Date of death	Burial/Commemoration
OSn.	Thomas E. Green	HMS Collingwood	18 Jun. 1943	St. Mary's Churchyard
Pte.	Raymond A. Harvey	4th Bn., Royal Norfolk Regiment	15 Sep. 1944	Kranji War Memorial
Pte.	Reginald V. Drake	5th Bn., Royal Norfolks	6 Jul. 1943	Kanchanaburi War Cemetery
