= Round-tower church =

Type of church in England

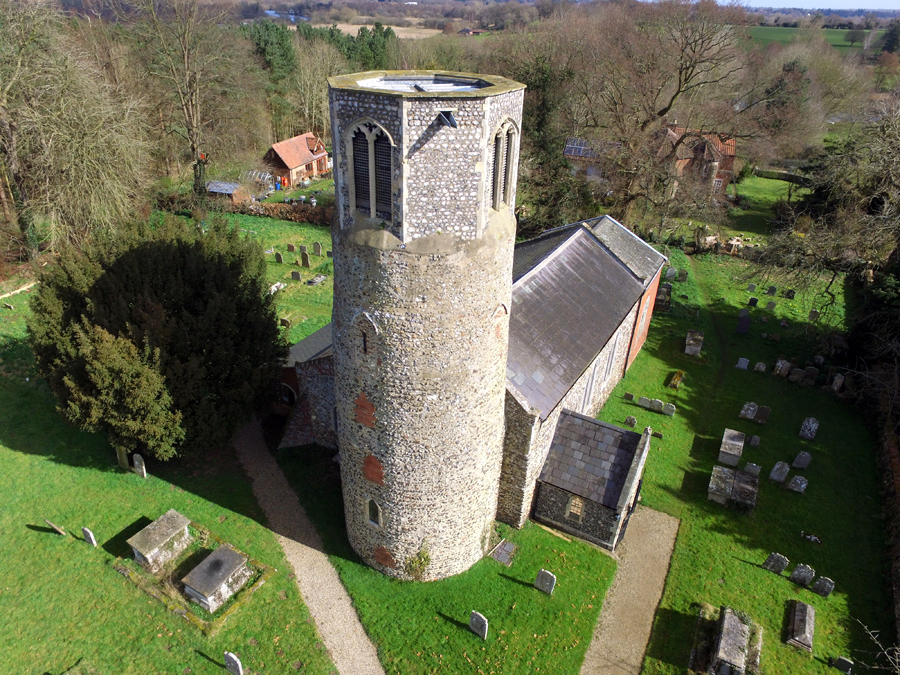
The parish church of St Mary, Surlingham, Norfolk

Round-tower churches are a type of church found mainly in England, mostly in East Anglia; of about 185 surviving examples in the country, 124 are in Norfolk, 38 in Suffolk, six in Essex, three in Sussex and two each in Cambridgeshire and Berkshire. There is evidence of about 20 round-tower churches in Germany, of similar design and construction to those in East Anglia. Countries with at least one round-tower church include Andorra, the Czech Republic, Denmark, France, Italy, Scotland, Sweden, Norway, Poland and South Africa.

There is no consensus between experts for why the distribution of round-tower churches in England is concentrated in the East of England:

- Round-tower churches are found in areas lacking normal building stone, and are therefore built of knapped flint. Corners are difficult to construct in flint, hence the thick, round walls of the towers.
- The churches are found in areas subject to raids from, for example, the Vikings, and were built as defensive structures, churches being added later. In fact, however, the towers are generally too short to have been of much use defensively, and the towers were often added to existing churches, having flat walls where they joined the main structure.
- In 937 King Æthelstan (924–939), the first King of all England, decrees that a bell tower be built on the land of every thane; an existing trend of building bell towers on to existing churches was thus accelerated.

Many other (less likely) explanations are offered in communities containing the churches, including appeals to ancient stone circles and the remains of wells.

Round-tower churches should not be confused with similarly shaped structures such as the Irish round towers found in Ireland and Scotland, or with round churches, which have a circular plan and are often found in Denmark or Sweden.

== List of round tower churches in England ==
=== Berkshire ===
- Great Shefford, St Mary
- Welford, St Gregory

=== Cambridgeshire ===
- Bartlow, St Mary
- Snailwell, St Peter

=== Essex ===
- Bardfield Saling, St Peter and St Paul
- Broomfield, St Mary
- Great Leighs, St Mary the Virgin
- Lamarsh, The Holy Innocents
- South Ockendon, St Nicholas of Myra
- Pentlow, St Gregory

=== Norfolk ===
- Acle, St Edmund
- Ashmanhaugh, St Swithin
- Aslacton, St Michael
- Aylmerton, St John the Baptist
- Barmer, All Saints
- Bawburgh, St Mary and St Walstan
- Beachamwell, St Mary
- Bedingham, St Andrew
- Beeston, St Lawrence
- Belton, All Saints
- Bessingham, St Mary (formerly St Andrew)
- Bexwell, St Mary
- Bradwell, St Nicholas
- Brampton, St Peter
- Brandiston, St Nicholas
- Breckles, St Margaret
- Brooke, St Peter
- Buckenham, St Nicholas Church
- Burgh Castle, St Peter and St Paul
- Burnham Deepdale, St Mary
- Burnham Norton, St Margaret
- Bylaugh, St Mary
- Clippesby, St Peter
- Cockley Cley, All Saints
- Colney, St Andrew
- Cranwich, St Mary
- Croxton, All Saints
- Denton, St Mary
- Dilham, St Nicholas
- East Lexham, St Andrew
- East Walton, St Mary
- Eccles, St Mary
- Edingthorpe, All Saints
- Feltwell, St Nicholas
- Fishley, St Mary
- Forncett, St Peter's
- Framingham Earl, St Andrew
- Freethorpe, All Saints
- Fritton, St Catherine
- Fritton, St Edmund
- Gayton Thorpe, St Mary
- Geldeston, St Michael
- Gissing, St Mary
- Great Hautbois, St Mary
- Great Ryburgh, St Andrew
- Gresham, All Saints
- Haddiscoe, St Mary
- Hales, St Margaret
- Hardley, St Margaret
- Hardwick, St Margaret
- Hassingham, St Mary
- Haveringland, St Peter
- Heckingham, St Gregory
- Hellington, St John the Baptist
- Hemblington, All Saints
- Horsey, All Saints
- Howe, St Mary
- Ingworth, St Lawrence
- Intwood, All Saints
- Keswick, All Saints
- Kilverstone, St Andrew
- Kirby Cane, All Saints
- Letheringsett, St Andrew
- Little Plumstead, St Protase and St Gervase
- Little Snoring, St Andrew
- Long Stratton, St Mary
- Matlaske, St Peter
- Mautby, St Peter and St Paul
- Merton, St Peter
- Morningthorpe, St John the Baptist
- Morton on the Hill, St Margaret
- Moulton, St Mary
- Needham, St Peter
- St Benedict's Church, Norwich
- Norwich, St Etheldreda
- Norwich, St Julian
- Norwich, St Mary at Coslany
- Norton Subcourse, St Mary
- Old Catton, St Margaret
- Poringland, All Saints
- Potter Heigham, St Nicholas
- Quidenham, St Andrew
- Raveningham, St Andrew
- Repps-with-Bastwick, St Peter
- Rockland, St Peter
- Rollesby, St George
- Roughton, St Mary
- Roydon, St Remigus
- Runhall, All Saints
- Rushall, St Mary
- Sedgeford, St Mary
- Seething, St Margaret
- Shereford, St Nicholas
- Shimpling, St George
- Sidestrand, St Michael
- South Pickenham, All Saints
- Stanford, All Saints
- Stockton, St Michael
- Stody, St Mary
- Surlingham, St Mary
- Sustead, St Peter and St Paul
- Swainsthorpe, St Peter
- Syderstone, St Mary
- Tasburgh, St Mary
- Taverham, St Edmund
- Thorpe Abbotts, All Saints
- Thorpe next Haddiscoe, St Matthias
- Threxton, All Saints
- Thwaite, All Saints
- Titchwell, St Mary
- Topcroft, St Margaret
- Tuttington, St Peter and St Paul
- Wacton, All Saints
- Watton, St Mary
- Weeting, St Mary
- Welborne, All Saints
- West Dereham, St Andrew
- West Lexham, St Nicholas
- West Somerton, St Mary
- Whitlingham, St Andrew (tower collapsed)
- Wickmere, St Andrew
- Witton, St Margaret
- Woodton, All Saints
- Worthing, St Margaret
- Wramplingham, St Peter and St Paul
- Yaxham, St Peter

=== Suffolk ===
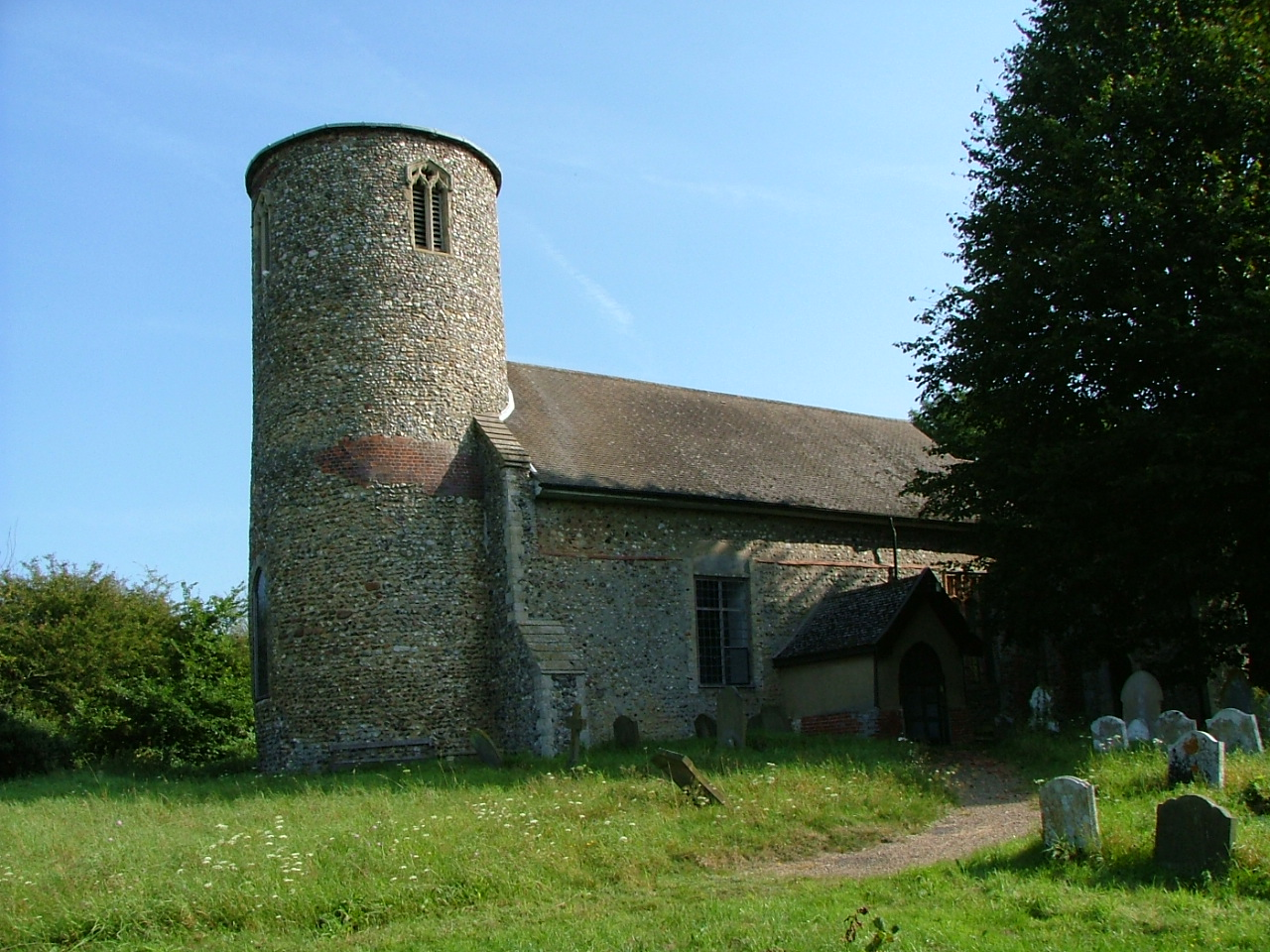
St Peter's Church, Bruisyard, Suffolk

- Aldham, St Mary
- Ashby, St Mary
- Barsham, Holy Trinity
- Beyton, All Saints
- Blundeston, St Mary
- Bramfield, St Andrew
- Brome, St Mary
- Bruisyard, St Peter
- Bungay, Holy Trinity
- Frostenden, All Saints
- Gisleham, Holy Trinity
- Gunton, St Peter
- Hasketon, St Andrew
- Church of St John Lateran, Hengrave
- Herringfleet, St Margaret
- Higham, St Stephen
- Holton, St Peter
- Ilketshall, St Andrew
- Ilketshall, St Margaret
- Little Bradley, All Saints
- Little Saxham, St Nicholas
- Lound, St John the Baptist
- Mettingham, All Saints
- Mutford, St Andrew
- Onehouse, St John the Baptist
- Ramsholt, All Saints
- Rickinghall Inferior, St Mary
- Risby, St Giles
- Rushmere, St Michael
- South Elmham, All Saints
- Spexhall, St Peter
- Stuston, All Saints
- Syleham, St Margaret
- Theberton, St Peter
- Thorington, St Peter
- Weybread, St Andrew
- Wissett, St Andrew
- Wortham, St Mary (This being the largest surviving in England)

=== Sussex ===
- Lewes, St Michael
- Piddinghoe, St John
- Southease, St Peter

== List of round tower churches in Sweden ==
=== Scania ===
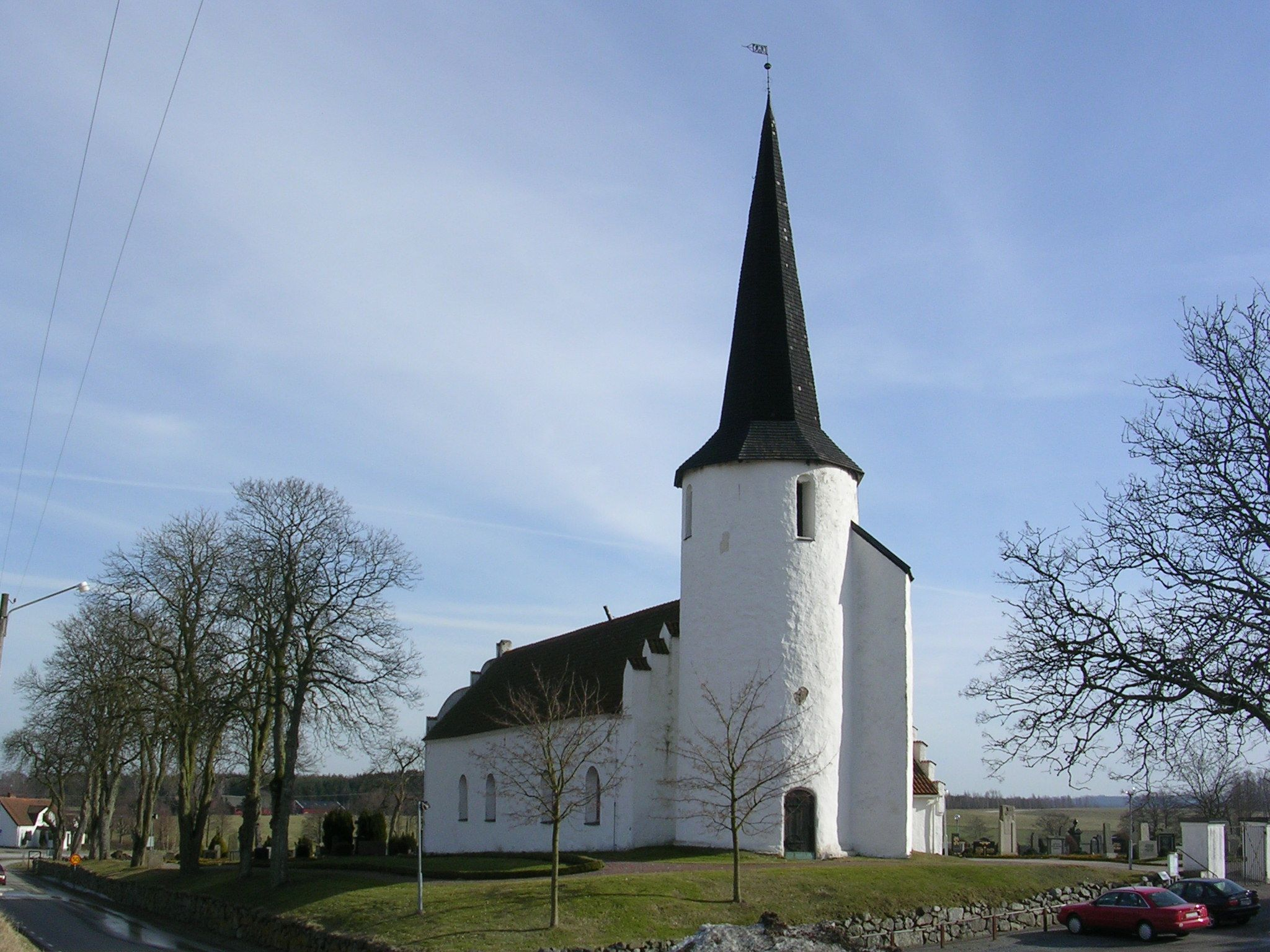
Blentarp Church in Scania, Sweden

- Blentarp Church
- Bollerup
- Dagstorp Church (demolished in 19th century)
- Hammarlöv
- Hammarlunda
- Önnarp Church (demolished in 19th century)

== Sources ==
- Round Tower Churches Society
- Focus on Round Tower – by John Worrall
- W. J. Goode, Round Tower Churches of South East England (Round Tower Churches Society)
- Lyn Stilgoe and Dorothy Shreeve, The Round Tower Churches of Norfolk, Canterbury Press, Norwich; ISBN 1-85311-448-0
