= Hammarlöv Church =

- Hammarlöv kyrka
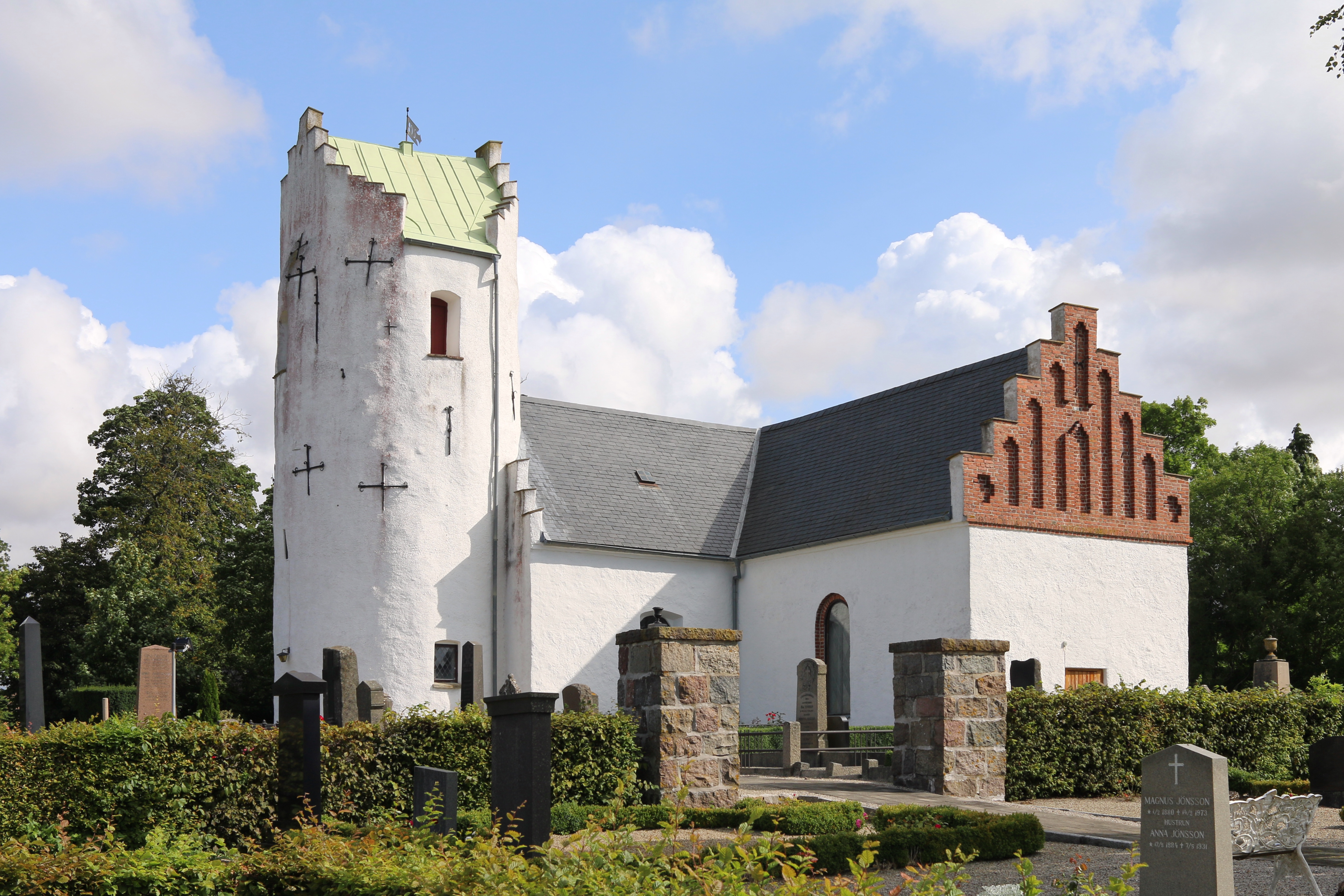
- Hammarlöv Church

- 55°24′48″N 13°08′07″E
- Country: Sweden
- Denomination: Church of Sweden

Hammarlöv Church (Swedish: Hammarlövs kyrka) is a medieval Lutheran church in the province of Scania, Sweden. It belongs to the Diocese of Lund.

== History and architecture ==
According to the Gesta Hammaburgensis ecclesiae pontificum, there were once around 300 wooden churches in Scania, and while none of these survive, traces of a wooden stave church have been found in Hammarlöv Church. This first church was likely built during the later part of the 12th century, and quite probably to designs by a master builder known as Mårten stenmästare, i.e. "Martin the master stonemason". He was active at the construction of Lund Cathedral and several church building projects in Scania. The presently visible stone church was probably built at the end of the 12th or early 13th century in a Romanesque style, although it has been altered since. The church is one of only four in Scania to have a round tower, the others being Hammarlunda, Blentarp and Bollerup. The reason for this unusual design is unclear. According to one source, it most probably formed a part of the original design of the church and served a defensive purpose, aimed especially at defending the congregation against the Wends, who are known to have raided the southern coast of Scania at the time. However, according to another source the tower is too small to have served as a fortification. Instead, the church tower may have been erected as a funerary monument by a local nobleman (who may be the subject of a much-faded mural inside the church). He may have participated in the Crusades or gone on a pilgrimage to the Holy Land, and erected the tower as a symbol of his connection to Jerusalem.

The church has been expanded several times, the last times being in 1800 and 1862. Inside, the church has a vaulted ceiling from the 15th century, decorated in the choir with murals. The choir is separated from the rest of the church by a chancel arch decorated with sculptures of lions.

Among the church fittings, the baptismal font is the oldest, dating from the time of the construction of the church. The altarpiece is from 1700 and the pulpit from the 17th century. A side gallery is decorated with paintings depicting the virtues, made during the 17th century. The organ is from 1851 and rebuilt in 1926.
