= Richard Foster (painter) =

Portrait painter from the United Kingdom

Richard Foster (born 1945) is a British painter, principally of portraits.

== Life ==
Foster was born in East Lexham, Norfolk and educated at Harrow School and Trinity College, Oxford with further artistic training at Studio Simi, Florence and the City and Guilds of London Institute.

Foster has been a member of the Royal Society of Portrait Painters since 1976 and President since 2017. Furthermore, he served as Vice-President from 1991 to 1994 and Treasurer from 2003 to 2006. Foster has also acted as a member of the Art Workers Guild since 1980.

Over his career, he has painted in both oil and watercolour, producing single portraits, group portraits, landscapes, and compositions, which he has exhibited at one-man shows held every three or four years.

== Works ==
=== Portraits ===
Portraits
Subject	Location	Reference
Ed Coode	Girton College	
Francis Curzon, 3rd Viscount Scarsdale	Kedleston Hall	
Douglas Ranger	University College London Art Museum	
Michael Checkland	Broadcasting House	
Edmund Compton	Royal Academy of Music	
Douglas Black	Royal College of Physicians	
George Burns	County Hall, Hertford	
Robert Hume	Royal College of Physicians and Surgeons of Glasgow	
Diana, Princess of Wales	Royal College of Physicians and Surgeons of Glasgow	
Vivian H. H. Green	Lincoln College, Oxford	
Burke Trend	Lincoln College, Oxford	
Oswald Phipps, 4th Marquess of Normanby	Green Howards Regimental Museum	

=== Other works ===
- The Nativity, Saint Andrew the Fisherman and The Second Coming – St. Andrew's Church, East Lexham, Norfolk
