= West Lexham =

Village in Norfolk, England

Coordinates: 52.721173°N 0.72558°E

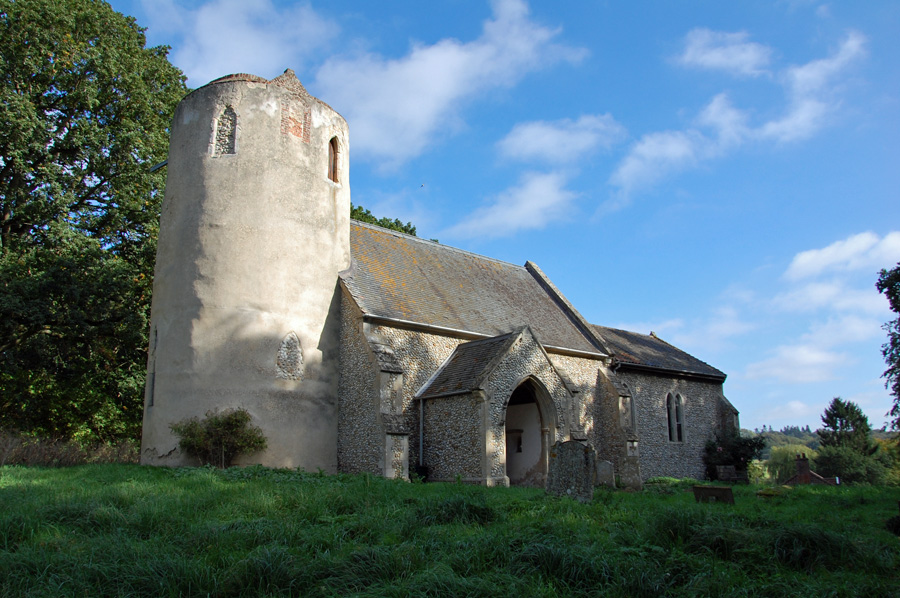
- Saint Nicholas parish church, West Lexham, Norfolk

- Location within Norfolk
- OS grid reference: TF840120
  - London: 105 miles (169 km)
- Civil parish: Lexham
- District: Breckland
- Shire county: Norfolk
- Region: East
- Country: England
- Sovereign state: United Kingdom
- Post town: KING`S LYNN
- Postcode district: PE32
- Dialling code: 01760
- Police: Norfolk
- Fire: Norfolk
- Ambulance: East of England

West Lexham is a village and former civil parish, now in the parish of Lexham, in the Breckland district, in the county of Norfolk, England. It is 5.9 miles (9.5 km) north of the town of Swaffham, 30.6 miles (49.2 km) west north west of Norwich and 105 miles (169 km) north east of London. In 1931, the parish had a population of 101. On 1 April 1935 the parish was abolished to form Lexham.

The village's name literally means, 'leech homestead/village', but probably in the sense of 'physician'.

The village lies about 0.5 miles (0.80 km) east of the A1065 Mildenhall to Fakenham road. The nearest railway station is at King's Lynn for the Fen Line which runs between King's Lynn and Cambridge. The nearest airport is Norwich International Airport.

West Lexham is the birthplace of Philip Skippon (c. 1600, West Lexham, Norfolk – c. 20 February 1660) who was an English soldier who fought in the English Civil War. He rose to the rank of Major General in the Parliamentarian New Model Army and was one of Oliver Cromwell's most senior generals. He fought at several major battles of the Civil War and before that had been a professional soldier in various wars in mainland Europe.
