= Grade I listed buildings in King's Lynn and West Norfolk =

There are over 9,000 Grade I listed buildings in England. This page is a list of these buildings in the district of King's Lynn and West Norfolk in Norfolk.

== King's Lynn and West Norfolk ==
Most Notable Grade I: Oxburgh Hall, Home to the Bedingfield Family.

Name	Location	Type	Completed (Note: The date given is the date used by Historic England as significant for the initial building or that of an important part in the structure's description.)	Date designated	Grid ref. (Note: The grid reference is based on the British national grid reference system, sometimes known as OSGB36, used by the Ordnance Survey.) Geo-coordinates	Entry number (Note: The "List Entry Number" is a unique number assigned to each listed building and scheduled monument by Historic England.)	Image
Church of St Andrew	Barton Bendish	Parish Church	c. 1200	8 July 1959	TF7121705687; 52°37′19″N 0°31′41″E	1077860	Church of St Andrew More images
Church of St Mary	Barton Bendish	Parish Church	14th century	8 July 1959	TF7097705437; 52°37′11″N 0°31′27″E	1077859	Church of St Mary More images
Ruins of Church of St James at TF 662 207	Bawsey	Parish Church	11th century	20 June 1988	TF6620020700; 52°45′30″N 0°27′41″E	1077664	Ruins of Church of St James at TF 662 207 More images
Church of St Mary	Great Bircham, Bircham	Parish Church	Early 14th century	5 June 1953	TF7704632600; 52°51′42″N 0°37′42″E	1077807	Church of St Mary More images
Church of St Mary	Brancaster	Parish Church	12th century	5 June 1953	TF7724543900; 52°57′47″N 0°38′15″E	1237744	Church of St Mary More images
Church of St Mary	Burnham Market	Church	c. 1500	5 June 1953	TF8302242092; 52°56′42″N 0°43′21″E	1238100	Church of St Mary More images
Church of St Margaret	Burnham Norton	Parish Church	Late 11th century	5 June 1953	TF8350142760; 52°57′03″N 0°43′48″E	1238877	Church of St Margaret More images
Gatehouse, Carmelite Friary Ruins	Burnham Norton	Carmelite Friary	1241	5 June 1953	TF8381542777; 52°57′03″N 0°44′05″E	1239045	Gatehouse, Carmelite Friary Ruins More images
Church of St Clement	Burnham Overy Town, Burnham Overy	Parish Church	12th century	5 June 1953	TF8430342929; 52°57′07″N 0°44′31″E	1239094	Church of St Clement More images
Church of All Saints	Burnham Thorpe	Parish Church	13th century	5 June 1953	TF8521641752; 52°56′28″N 0°45′18″E	1239270	Church of All Saints More images
Bailey Gate	Castle Acre	Castle Gate	13th century	13 April 1987	TF8173115150; 52°42′13″N 0°41′18″E	1077681	Bailey Gate More images
Castle Acre Castle	Castle Acre	Castle Keep	Mid 12th century	13 April 1987	TF8192015169; 52°42′13″N 0°41′28″E	1171480	Castle Acre Castle More images
Church of St James	Castle Acre	Parish Church	c. 1300	15 August 1960	TF8159815022; 52°42′09″N 0°41′11″E	1342386	Church of St James More images
Remains of Cluniac Benedictine Priory of St Mary and St Peter and St Paul	Castle Acre	Priory (ruin)	Norman	13 April 1987	TF8142614757; 52°42′00″N 0°41′01″E	1342389	Remains of Cluniac Benedictine Priory of St Mary and St Peter and St Paul More images
Remains of Gatehouse of Cluniac Priory of St Mary and St Peter and St Paul	Castle Acre	Gatehouse (ruin)	1090	13 April 1987	TF8136414940; 52°42′06″N 0°40′58″E	1171437	Remains of Gatehouse of Cluniac Priory of St Mary and St Peter and St Paul More images
Church of St Lawrence	Castle Rising	Parish Church	12th century	15 August 1960	TF6663824866; 52°47′44″N 0°28′12″E	1077602	Church of St Lawrence More images
Ruins of Castle and Eleventh Century Church	Castle Rising	Castle	c. 1138	21 February 1989	TF6657624554; 52°47′34″N 0°28′08″E	1077599	Ruins of Castle and Eleventh Century Church More images
Trinity Hospital (hospital of the Holy and Undivided Trinity) and attached Enclosing Walls, Circa 30 Metres East of Church of St	Castle Rising	Almshouses	1609-15	19 October 1951	TF6668624865; 52°47′44″N 0°28′15″E	1342436	Trinity Hospital (hospital of the Holy and Undivided Trinity) and attached Enclosing Walls, Circa 30 Metres East of Church of St More images
Church of St Nicholas	Dersingham	Parish Church	14th century	5 June 1953	TF6931130386; 52°50′40″N 0°30′45″E	1342317	Church of St Nicholas More images
Church of St Edmund	Downham Market	Church	15th century	24 February 1949	TF6127903305; 52°36′13″N 0°22′48″E	1342608	Church of St Edmund More images
Church of St Mary	East Walton	Parish Church	12th century	15 August 1960	TF7426716112; 52°42′53″N 0°34′42″E	1077667	Church of St Mary More images
Church of St Edmund	Emneth	Parish Church	c. 1210	11 August 1951	TF4885307383; 52°38′38″N 0°11′55″E	1077736	Church of St Edmund More images
Church of St Mary	Feltwell	Parish Church	Mid 14th century	8 July 1959	TL7151890738; 52°29′15″N 0°31′29″E	1077715	Church of St Mary More images
Church of St Nicholas	Feltwell	Parish Church (redundant)	12th century	8 July 1959	TL7125690890; 52°29′21″N 0°31′15″E	1342364	Church of St Nicholas More images
Church of St Martin	Fincham	Parish Church	Mid 15th century	8 July 1959	TF6880106458; 52°37′47″N 0°29′34″E	1077822	Church of St Martin More images
Church of St Mary	Gayton Thorpe, Gayton	Parish Church	Early 12th century	15 August 1960	TF7450218526; 52°44′10″N 0°35′00″E	1077632	Church of St Mary More images
Church of St Nicholas	Gayton	Church	1604	15 August 1960	TF7302219262; 52°44′36″N 0°33′42″E	1077638	Church of St Nicholas More images
Church of St Mary	Great Massingham	Parish Church	13th century	15 August 1960	TF7987422949; 52°46′27″N 0°39′54″E	1171571	Church of St Mary More images
Church of St Botolph	Grimston	Parish Church	13th century	15 August 1960	TF7217021891; 52°46′02″N 0°33′02″E	1342401	Church of St Botolph More images
Church of St Lawrence	Harpley	Parish Church	13th century	15 August 1960	TF7887126067; 52°48′09″N 0°39′07″E	1077655	Church of St Lawrence More images
Church of St James	Hockwold cum Wilton	Parish Church	Early 14th century	8 July 1959	TL7346888008; 52°27′45″N 0°33′07″E	1077725	Church of St James More images
Church of St Peter	Hockwold cum Wilton	Parish Church	Mid 14th century	8 July 1959	TL7249188015; 52°27′46″N 0°32′15″E	1306877	Church of St Peter More images
Church of St Mary	Holme-next-the-Sea	Parish Church	Perpendicular	5 June 1953	TF7070443429; 52°57′40″N 0°32′24″E	1171431	Church of St Mary More images
Church of St Martin	Houghton Park, Houghton Hall, Houghton	Parish Church	14th century	5 June 1953	TF7937028382; 52°49′23″N 0°39′38″E	1077787	Church of St Martin More images
Houghton Hall with Courtyard Walls Attached to North and South	Houghton Park, Houghton	Country House	1722-1735	5 June 1953	TF7916528789; 52°49′37″N 0°39′28″E	1152645	Houghton Hall with Courtyard Walls Attached to North and South More images
The Square, Houghton Hall	Houghton Park, Houghton	Stables	c. 1900	9 October 1985	TF7904728600; 52°49′31″N 0°39′21″E	1152782	The Square, Houghton Hall More images
The Watertower	Houghton Park, Houghton Hall, Houghton	Water Tower	c. 1733	9 October 1985	TF7899229464; 52°49′59″N 0°39′20″E	1342318	The Watertower More images
Church of St Andrew	Little Massingham	Parish Church	14th century	15 August 1960	TF7925824149; 52°47′07″N 0°39′24″E	1171638	Church of St Andrew More images
Church of Holy Trinity	Marham	Parish Church	12th century	8 July 1959	TF7081509737; 52°39′30″N 0°31′27″E	1077832	Church of Holy Trinity More images
Church of St George	Methwold	Church	1721	8 July 1959	TL7323794827; 52°31′26″N 0°33′07″E	1077730	Church of St George More images
The Old Vicarage	Methwold	House	16th century	9 July 1951	TL7321694764; 52°31′24″N 0°33′06″E	1342369	The Old Vicarage More images
Middleton Tower	Tower End, Middleton	House	c. 1455	19 October 1951	TF6686817564; 52°43′48″N 0°28′11″E	1077649	Middleton Tower More images
Church of St Mary	North Creake	Parish Church	c. 1300	5 June 1953	TF8541037729; 52°54′18″N 0°45′20″E	1077816	Church of St Mary More images
Creake Abbey Farmhouse	North Creake	Abbey	Medieval	5 June 1953	TF8561539450; 52°55′13″N 0°45′34″E	1342331	Upload Photo
Garden Walls Attached to North of Creake Abbey Farmhouse	North Creake	Abbey	Medieval	18 April 1985	TF8561539475; 52°55′14″N 0°45′34″E	1304717	Upload Photo
Remains of Creake Abbey Church	North Creake	Abbey	1206-1507	5 June 1953	TF8561339490; 52°55′15″N 0°45′34″E	1077815	Remains of Creake Abbey Church More images
Church of All Saints	North Runcton	Parish Church	1713	15 August 1960	TF6465015901; 52°42′57″N 0°26′10″E	1342408	Church of All Saints More images
Church of St Andrew	Northwold	Parish Church	13th century	8 July 1959	TL7558197006; 52°32′33″N 0°35′16″E	1342348	Church of St Andrew More images
Church of St Mary	Old Hunstanton	Parish Church	c. 1860	5 June 1953	TF6890541980; 52°56′55″N 0°30′45″E	1077920	Church of St Mary More images
Detached Porch in Courtyard, Hunstanton Hall	Old Hunstanton	Country House	1618	5 June 1953	TF6917641823; 52°56′50″N 0°30′59″E	1077922	Upload Photo
Entrance Gate Curtain Walls and Barn to East of Hunstanton Hall	Old Hunstanton	Gate	1623	20 September 1984	TF6924041814; 52°56′49″N 0°31′03″E	1171822	Entrance Gate Curtain Walls and Barn to East of Hunstanton Hall
Hunstanton Hall Moat, Bridge and Garden and Forecourt Walls	Old Hunstanton	Country House	1487	5 June 1953	TF6919241813; 52°56′49″N 0°31′00″E	1171725	Hunstanton Hall Moat, Bridge and Garden and Forecourt Walls More images
Church of St Clement	Outwell	Parish Church	13th century	11 August 1951	TF5137203664; 52°36′35″N 0°14′03″E	1171520	Church of St Clement More images
Church of St Mary Magdalene	Pentney	Parish Church	12th century	15 August 1960	TF7208213856; 52°41′42″N 0°32′42″E	1077623	Church of St Mary Magdalene More images
Remains of Augustinian Priory	Pentney	Augustinian Monastery	c. 1130	19 October 1951	TF7009612155; 52°40′49″N 0°30′53″E	1342419	Remains of Augustinian Priory More images
Church of St James	Runcton Holme	Parish Church	Early 12th century	8 July 1959	TF6172709488; 52°39′32″N 0°23′23″E	1077884	Church of St James More images
Wallington Hall	Runcton Holme	Country House	Mid 18th century	9 July 1951	TF6272307588; 52°38′30″N 0°24′13″E	1342286	Wallington Hall More images
Ruins of Church of St Felix at TF 666 261	Sandringham	Parish Church	14th century	15 August 1960	TF6660026100; 52°48′24″N 0°28′13″E	1168733	Ruins of Church of St Felix at TF 666 261 More images
Church of St Mary	Sedgeford	Parish Church	12th century	5 June 1953	TF7072036483; 52°53′55″N 0°32′12″E	1172064	Church of St Mary More images
Church of All Saints	Shouldham	Parish Church	14th century	8 July 1959	TF6812708903; 52°39′06″N 0°29′02″E	1152173	Church of All Saints More images
Church of St Mary	Snettisham	Parish Church	Late 14th century	5 June 1953	TF6904834281; 52°52′46″N 0°30′38″E	1304420	Church of St Mary More images
Church of St Mary	South Creake	Parish Church	13th century	5 June 1953	TF8552636232; 52°53′29″N 0°45′23″E	1077798	Church of St Mary More images
Church of All Saints	Stanhoe	Parish Church	13th century	5 June 1953	TF8020436880; 52°53′57″N 0°40′40″E	1304643	Church of All Saints More images
Stanhoe Hall	Stanhoe	House	1703	5 June 1953	TF7999736991; 52°54′01″N 0°40′29″E	1342334	Upload Photo
Church of Holy Trinity	Stow Bardolph	Parish Church	12th century	8 July 1959	TF6284005645; 52°37′27″N 0°24′15″E	1342291	Church of Holy Trinity More images
Church of St Mary	Syderstone	Parish Church	12th century	5 June 1953	TF8330432665; 52°51′37″N 0°43′17″E	1153280	Church of St Mary More images
Church of Saint Clement	Terrington St Clement	Church	13th century	11 August 1951	TF5520420436; 52°45′33″N 0°17′55″E	1237112	Church of Saint Clement More images
Tower to Church of Saint Clement	Terrington St. Clement	Bell Tower	1501-1527	24 June 1987	TF5518620451; 52°45′34″N 0°17′54″E	1264263	Tower to Church of Saint Clement More images
Church of Saint John	Terrington St John	Bell Tower	Late 13th century	11 August 1951	TF5393115853; 52°43′06″N 0°16′39″E	1264266	Church of Saint John More images
Church of All Saints	Thornham	Parish Church	13th century	5 June 1953	TF7337143446; 52°57′37″N 0°34′47″E	1342296	Church of All Saints More images
Church of All Saints	Tilney All Saints	Parish Church	Late 12th century	11 August 1951	TF5683717973; 52°44′12″N 0°19′18″E	1264202	Church of All Saints More images
Church of St Mary	Titchwell	Parish Church	12th century	5 June 1953	TF7622043874; 52°57′48″N 0°37′20″E	1273641	Church of St Mary More images
Church of St Peter	Upwell	Parish Church	13th century	11 August 1951	TF5059302780; 52°36′07″N 0°13′20″E	1342359	Church of St Peter More images
Church of St Andrew	Walpole	Church	Earlier Material	11 August 1951	TF5016217558; 52°44′05″N 0°13′21″E	1264158	Church of St Andrew More images
Church of St Peter	Walpole	Parish Church	Early 14th century	11 August 1951	TF5021216879; 52°43′43″N 0°13′23″E	1264167	Church of St Peter More images
Church of All Saints	Walsoken	Church	C20	11 August 1951	TF4772010544; 52°40′21″N 0°11′00″E	1171765	Church of All Saints More images
Church of Ss Peter and Paul	Watlington	Parish Church	Late 13th century	8 July 1959	TF6210711195; 52°40′27″N 0°23′46″E	1077890	Church of Ss Peter and Paul More images
Church of All Saints	West Acre	Parish Church	14th century	15 August 1960	TF7808015237; 52°42′20″N 0°38′04″E	1342409	Church of All Saints More images
High House	West Acre	Country House	Mid 18th century	19 October 1951	TF7928418126; 52°43′52″N 0°39′13″E	1305453	High House More images
High House Stable Court and Curtain Wall Attached at East of High House	West Acre	Brewery	c. 1829	13 April 1987	TF7934618152; 52°43′53″N 0°39′17″E	1342411	Upload Photo
West Acre Priory Gatehouse	West Acre	Augustinian Monastery	c. 1100	19 October 1951	TF7805015231; 52°42′20″N 0°38′02″E	1077660	West Acre Priory Gatehouse More images
Church of St Andrew	West Dereham	Church	1710	8 July 1959	TF6674602104; 52°35′28″N 0°27′37″E	1170580	Church of St Andrew More images
Church of St Peter	West Rudham	Parish Church	13th century	5 June 1953	TF8195327642; 52°48′56″N 0°41′55″E	1153338	Church of St Peter More images
Bell Tower of Church of St Mary	West Walton	Bell Tower	1240-1250	28 July 1986	TF4712613318; 52°41′51″N 0°10′33″E	1171875	Bell Tower of Church of St Mary More images
Church of St Mary	West Walton	Parish Church	c1240-1250	11 August 1951	TF4711313361; 52°41′53″N 0°10′32″E	1077676	Church of St Mary More images
Church of St Germans	Wiggenhall St Germans	Parish Church	13th century	8 July 1959	TF5969314015; 52°42′01″N 0°21′43″E	1077892	Church of St Germans More images
Church of St Mary the Virgin	Wiggenhall St Germans	Parish Church	13th century	8 July 1959	TF5826414404; 52°42′15″N 0°20′27″E	1342293	Church of St Mary the Virgin More images
Church of St Mary Magdalen	Wiggenhall St Mary Magdalen	Parish Church	13th century	8 July 1959	TF5986411374; 52°40′35″N 0°21′47″E	1077896	Church of St Mary Magdalen More images
Church of St Botolph	Wormegay	Parish Church	Mid 12th century	26 April 1985	TF6530210904; 52°40′14″N 0°26′36″E	1077838	Church of St Botolph More images
Chapel of St Nicholas	King's Lynn	Chapel of Ease	1146	1 December 1951	TF6185320455; 52°45′27″N 0°23′49″E	1210545	Chapel of St Nicholas More images
Church of St Margaret	King's Lynn	Parish Church	1741	1 December 1951	TF6177219806; 52°45′06″N 0°23′44″E	1211336	Church of St Margaret More images
Clifton House	King's Lynn	House	17th century	1 December 1951	TF6165319937; 52°45′10″N 0°23′38″E	1210377	Clifton House More images
Custom House Including North Bank of Purfleet Quay	King's Lynn	Statue	1683	7 June 1972	TF6162720042; 52°45′14″N 0°23′36″E	1195414	Custom House Including North Bank of Purfleet Quay More images
Greyfriars Tower in Tower Gardens	King's Lynn	Church tower	c. 1230	1 December 1951	TF6201219787; 52°45′05″N 0°23′56″E	1195428	Greyfriars Tower in Tower Gardens More images
Guildhall	King's Lynn	Guildhall	1422-28	1 December 1951	TF6171619861; 52°45′08″N 0°23′41″E	1211953	Guildhall More images
Guildhall of St George	King's Lynn	Guildhall	1410-1420	1 December 1951	TF6161820224; 52°45′20″N 0°23′36″E	1290960	Guildhall of St George More images
Hampton Court	King's Lynn	Merchants House	Early 14th century	1 December 1951	TF6173519740; 52°45′04″N 0°23′42″E	1195430	Hampton Court More images
Hanse House	King's Lynn	House	Mid 18th century	1 December 1951	TF6172719766; 52°45′05″N 0°23′41″E	1195393	Hanse House More images
Red Mount Chapel	King's Lynn	Chapel	C20	1 December 1951	TF6247019842; 52°45′06″N 0°24′21″E	1195403	Red Mount Chapel More images
South Gate	King's Lynn	Town Gate	Late 13th century	1 December 1951	TF6219919157; 52°44′45″N 0°24′05″E	1195304	South Gate More images
Thoresby College	King's Lynn	Apartment	1963-4	1 December 1951	TF6167319849; 52°45′07″N 0°23′39″E	1195418	Thoresby College More images
28, 30, 32 King Street	King's Lynn	First Floor Hall House	c. 1180	1 December 1951	TF6165220175; 52°45′18″N 0°23′38″E	1195291	Upload Photo
