= Creake =

Creake is the main element of the names of two villages in Norfolk, England:

- North Creake
- South Creake

== See also ==
- Creake Abbey
