= The Brinks, Northwold =

Protected area in Norfolk, England

Coordinates: 52.528°N 0.586°E

- Site of Special Scientific Interest
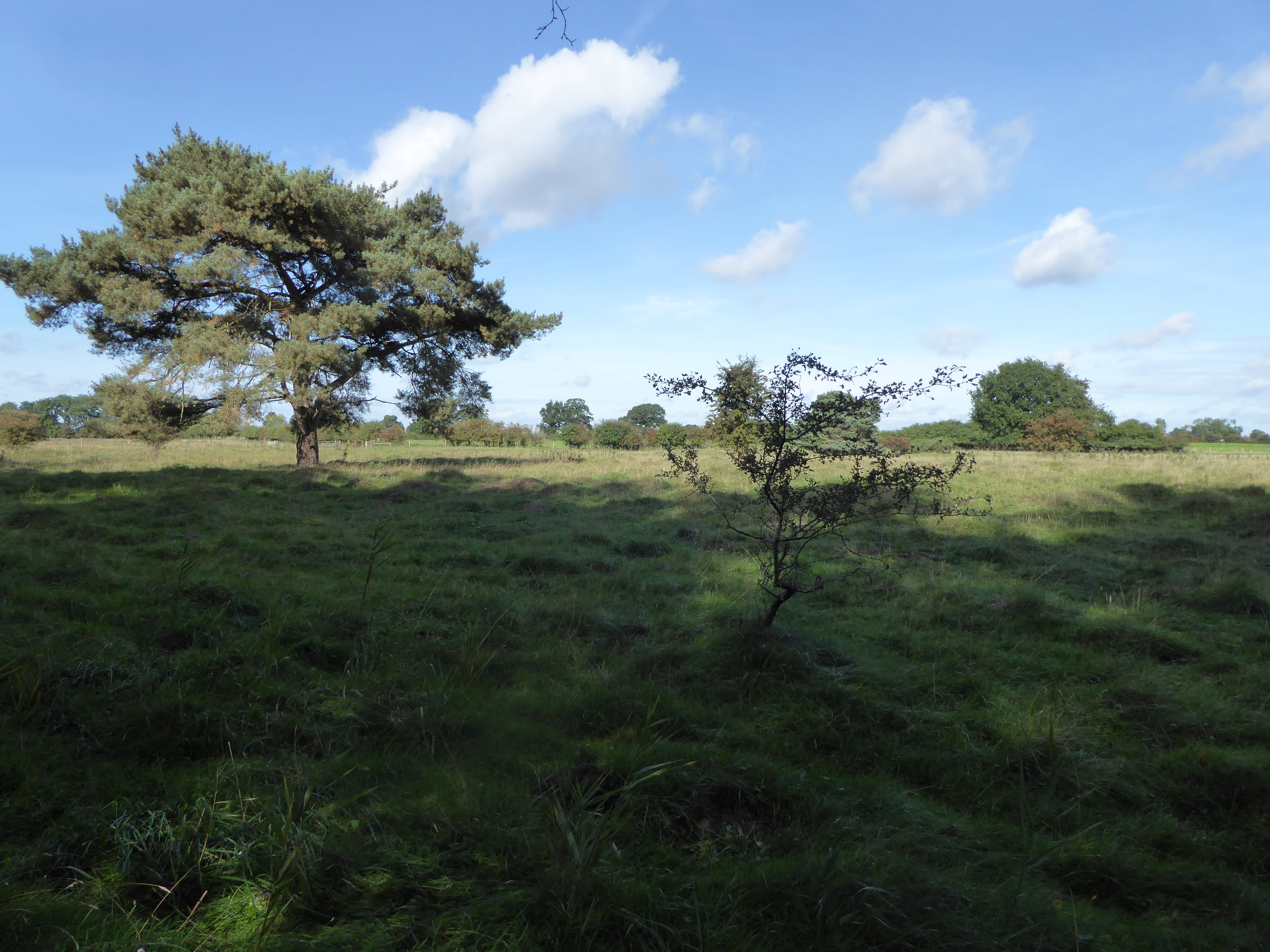
- Location of The Brinks, Northwold.
- Area of search: Norfolk
- Grid reference: TL 755 954
- Interest: Biological
- Area: 16.4 hectares (41 acres)
- Notification date: 1996
- Location map: Magic Map

The Brinks, Northwold or Northwold Meadows is a 16.4-hectare (41-acre) biological Site of Special Scientific Interest south of Northwold in Norfolk, England.

These unimproved meadows have areas of tall herbs and grassland grazed by cattle and sheep. There are also areas of woodland and several ponds. More than 140 flowering plants have been recorded, including green-winged orchid, black knapweed and pepper saxifrage.

The site is private land with no public access.
