= River Burn, Norfolk =

River in northwest Norfolk, England

River Burn
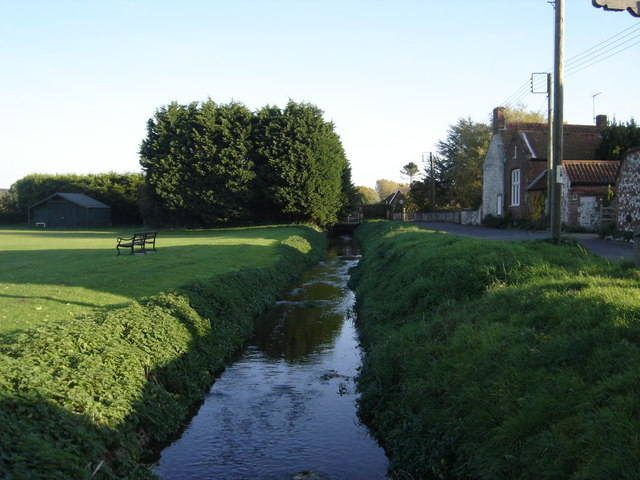
- The Burn at Burnham Thorpe

- Location of the river mouth within Norfolk

Location
- Country: England
- County: Norfolk

Physical characteristics
- Source
  - location: South Creake
  - coordinates: 52.8726°N 0.764°E
- Mouth
  - location: Overy Creek, Burnham Overy Staithe
  - coordinates: 52.9610°N 0.7301°E
- Length: 12.3 km (7.6 mi)
- Basin size: 101 km^{2} (39 sq mi)
- Discharge
  - location: Burnham Overy
  - average: 0.32 m^{3}/s (11 cu ft/s)

The River Burn (also known as "Nelsons River") is a chalk river in the northwest of the County of Norfolk, in the East of England. From its source to its mouth on the North Coast of Norfolk it is 12.3 kilometres (7.6 mi). The river has a fall of 36 metres to the sea.

== Course ==
The source is one mile south of the village of South Creake, in a small copse west of a bend in London Lane. From the source it runs northeast towards the village of South Creake, where at Fakenham road it turns northwest and run through the village. Gradually the river turns north and runs along the western side of the Burnham road heading towards North Creake.

The river runs through the village of North Creake, crosses under the Burnham Road and heads north across the open countryside towards the ruins of Creake Abbey. This abbey is on the southern edge of the Burnham’s, a mile or so from Burnham Thorpe. It was built towards the end of the 14th century for an Augustinian priory which had inhabited this spot since the 1220s, becoming an abbey shortly afterwards. Creake Abbey is unusual, because although it survived into the 16th century, it never suffered the effects of the Reformation or the dissolution of the monasteries. In 1508, an outbreak of plague killed virtually all the inhabitants, and it was abandoned.

The river runs through a small pool in what were the grounds on the west side of the abbey, and then passes under the lane and out northwards across countryside towards Burnham Thorpe. At Burnham Thorpe the river runs through another pool very close to the site of the Burnham Thorpe Parsonage. That parsonage was the birthplace of Admiral Horatio Nelson. Burnham Thorpe was originally one of a group of seven villages all prefixed with "Burnham" taking their name from the river. It is approximately three miles from the North Norfolk coast, a low, flat coastline of muted colour, of sand and salt-marsh. From the high ground above the village one can see the sea, and it is said that from there you can hear the sound of surf on the sand of the shore.

The river now curves northwest through the village towards Thorpe common. The Manor House on Thorpe common has a moat all around supplied with water from the river. Further on the river passes under the route of the dismantled West Norfolk Junction Railway to the east of Burnham Market. From here the river widens a little and flows into the mill pond at Burnham Overy.

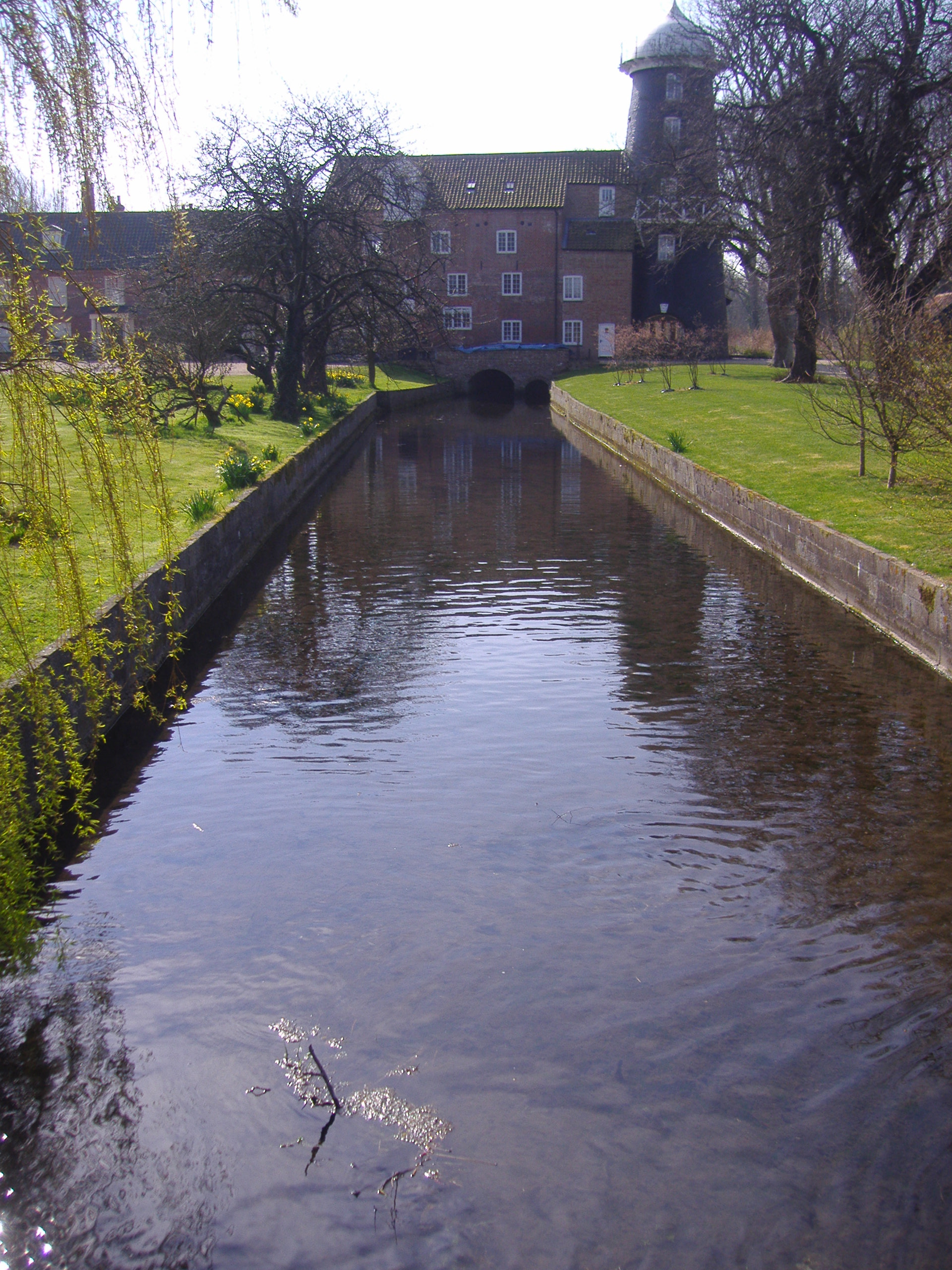
Burnham Overy Union Mill.

Burnham Overy Union mill is one of only two mills in Norfolk to use both water and wind power from the same site. The watermill section had 3 pairs of stones, and the windmill had a further 2 pairs. Both mills were built in 1737, being constructed of brick, the watermill having two storeys under a Norfolk pan tiled roof, with a third storey being added later. The windmill was originally built with five floors, but a sixth was subsequently added. In 1825 the sails had copper vanes.

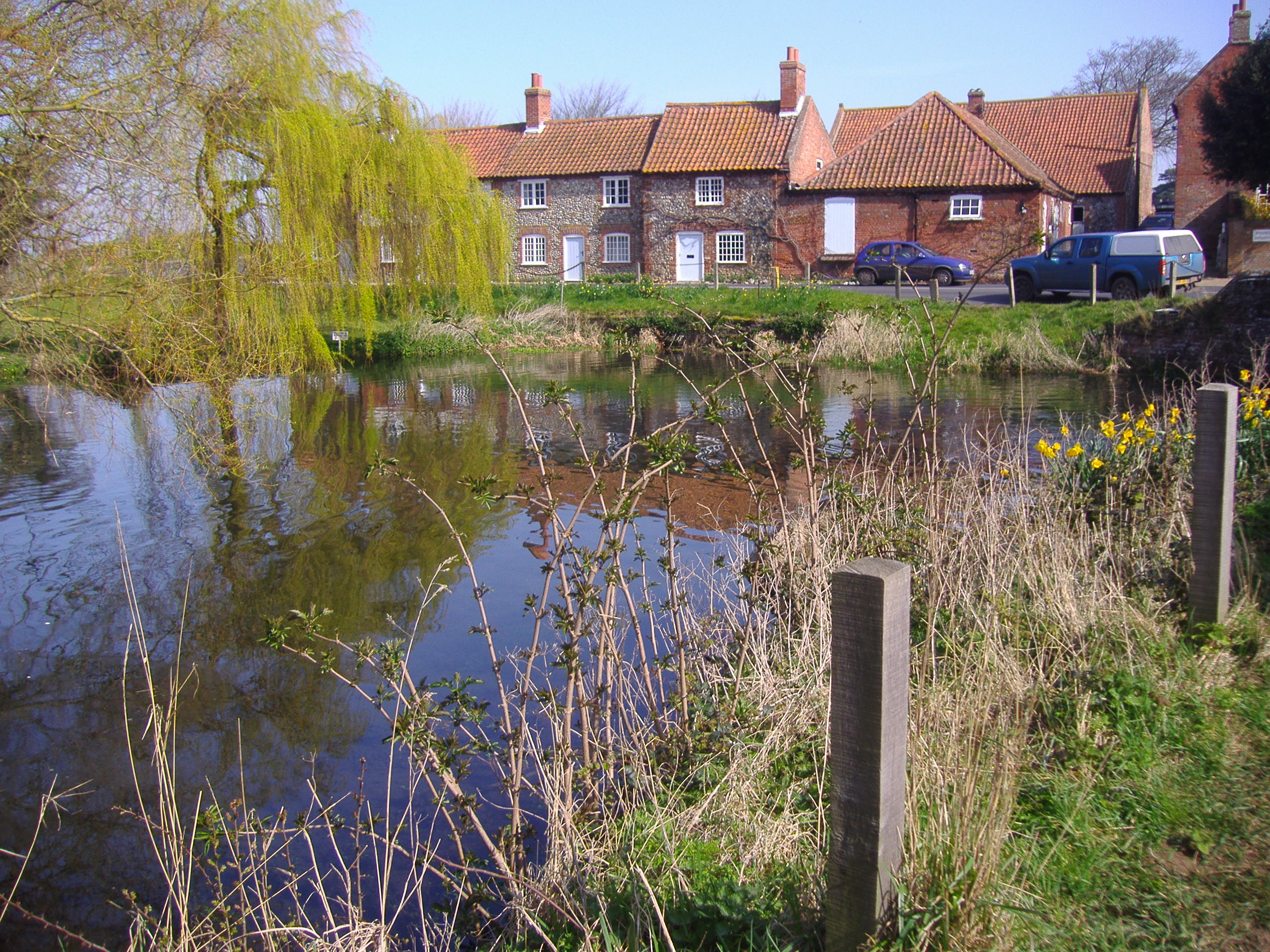
The Lower Mill at Burnham Overy

Just a very short distance on the river reaches a second watermill. The lower mill at Burnham Overy is the second of two watermills on the river Burn. This mill consists of a long row of buildings in four sections, three storeys high, built from local red brick with pantile roofs; it was originally three stories high, but after it burnt down in the 1940s Christopher Curtis Green (son of William Curtis Green who lives in the Mill House re-drew it for it to be re-built with a less overbearing two stories, as it stands today. The mill dates from 1795. The inlet water bridge is in between the second and third building. The A149 coast road passes over the river at the mill site.

From here the river enters Overy marshes and Overy Creek. The river spreads out into multiple tidal creeks through the salt marshes that fringe the coast thereabouts, and finally leaves land and enters the sea between the eastern point of Scolt Head Island and Overy Marshes, the gap locally known as Burnham Harbour. Small boats can reach Burnham Overy Staithe through this gap and creek.

== See also ==
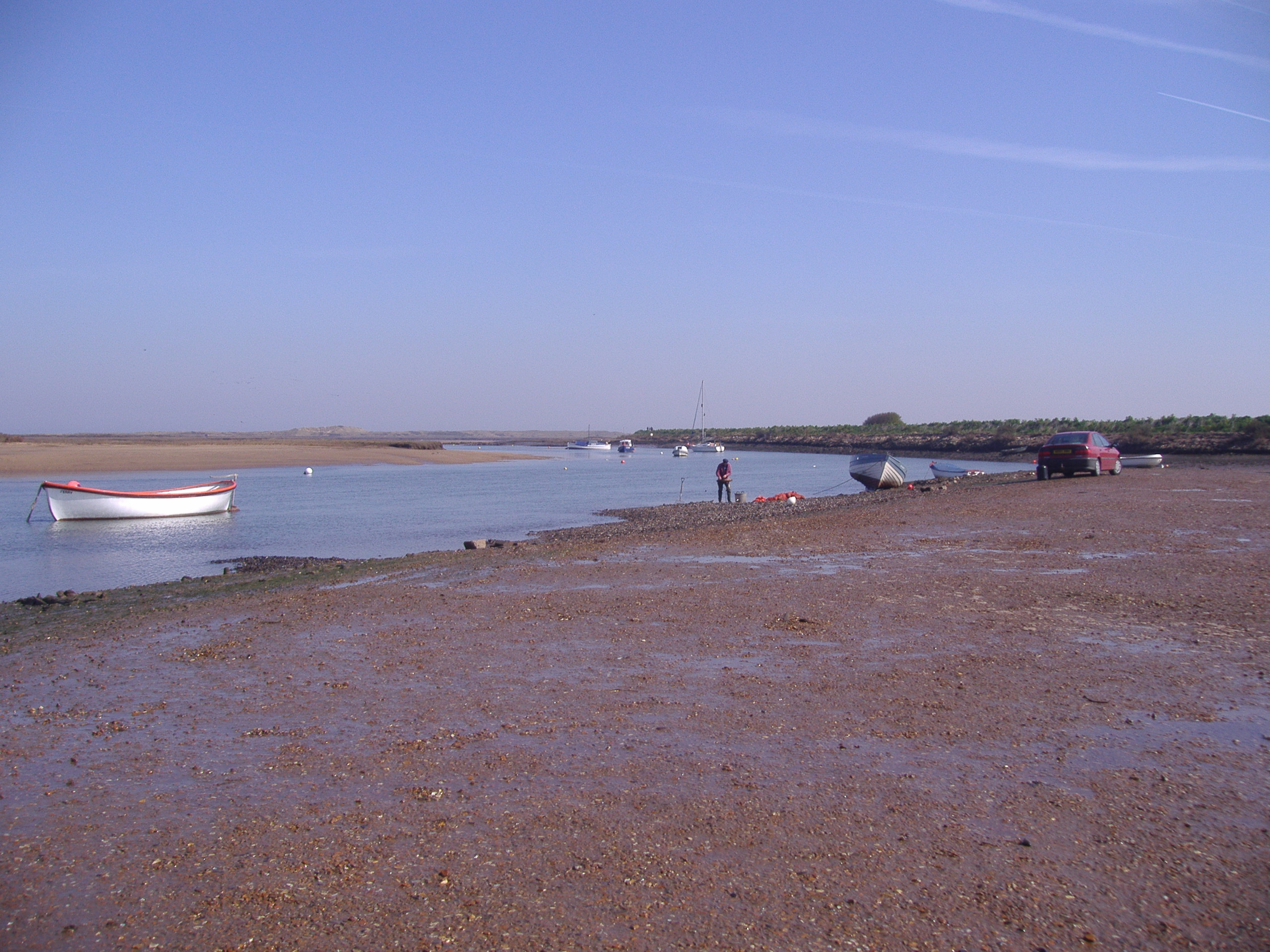
The Mouth of the river at Overy Creek

- List of rivers of England
