= Bloodgate Hill Iron Age Fort =

Hill fort in Norfolk, England

Coordinates: 52.88340°N 0.74504°E

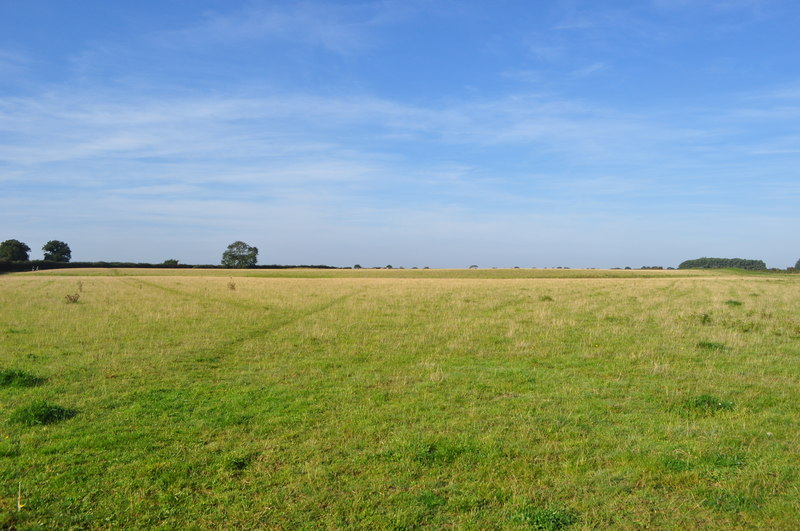
The Hillfort in 2010

The Bloodgate Hill Iron Age Fort is an Iron Age hill fort in Norfolk, England, situated on a hill above the village of South Creake in the north of the county. The meaning of the name Bloodgate is unknown, but is taken from the road that runs from the fort to the village.

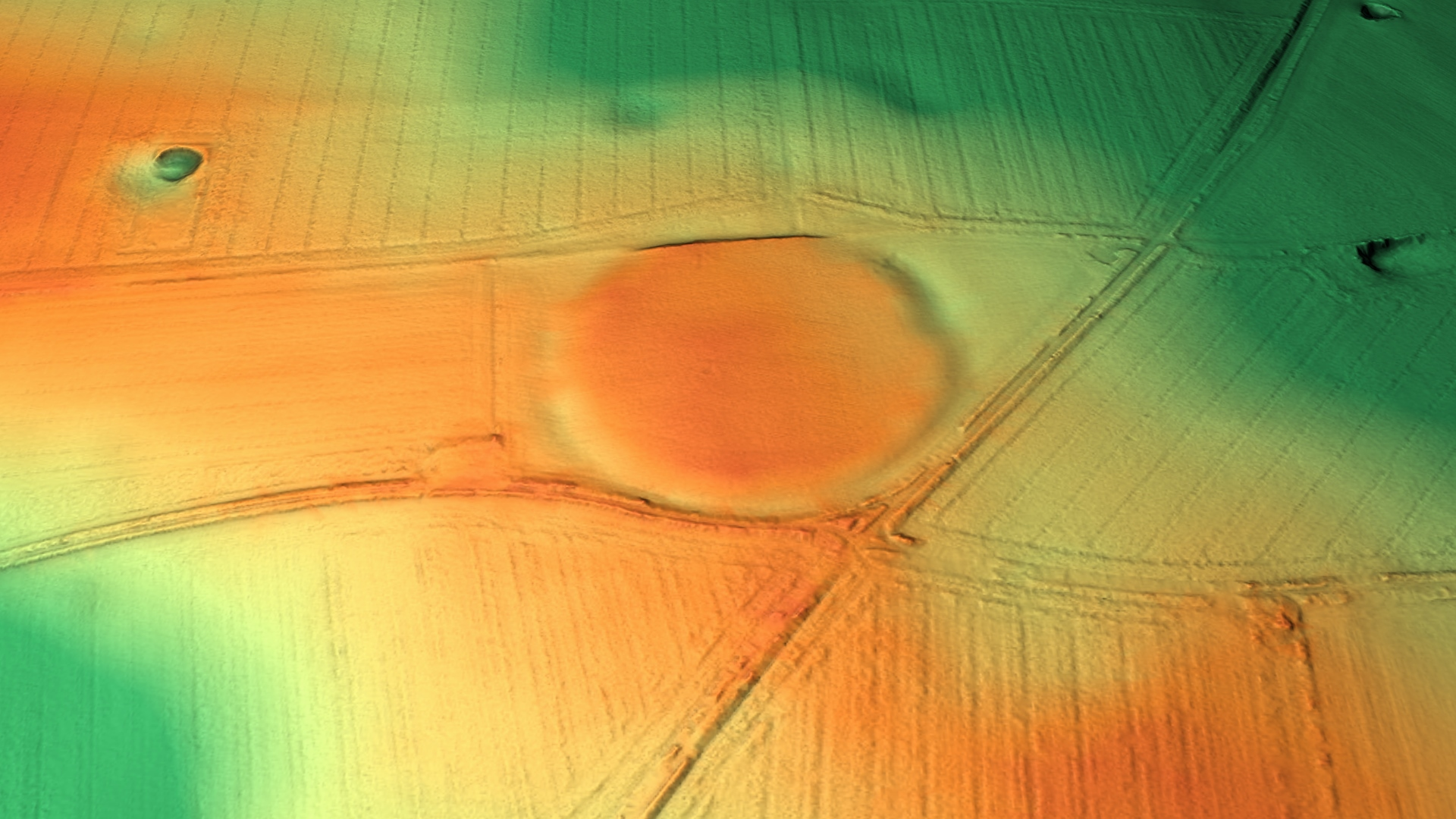
3D view of the digital terrain model

The circular fort has a diameter of 210 metres, making it the largest of the hill forts known in Norfolk. Much of the visible remains disappeared in 1827–8, when the ramparts were levelled during agricultural improvements. The land continued to be ploughed until 2003, when the land was acquired by the Norfolk Archaeological Trust. The site is now preserved and accessible. However little excavation has yet been undertaken.
