= St Andrew's Church, Northwold =

Coordinates: 52.5426°N 0.5878°E

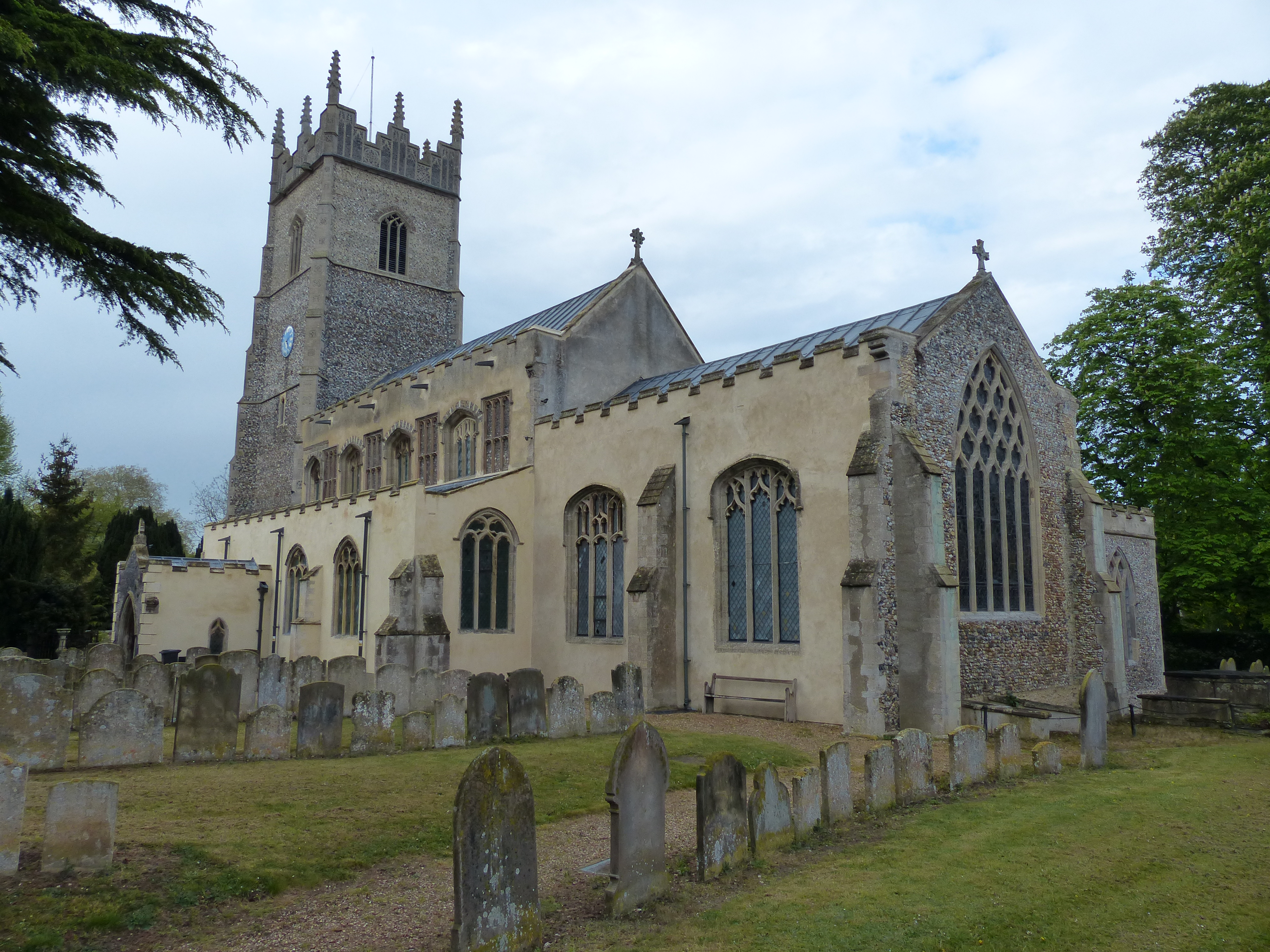

- Location in Norfolk
- OS grid reference: TL 75581 97006
- Location: Northwold, Norfolk
- Country: England
- Denomination: Anglican

History
- Dedication: St Andrew

Architecture
- Functional status: Church of England parish church
- Heritage designation: Grade I
- Designated: 8 July 1959
- Architectural type: Church
- Style: Perpendicular Gothic
- Groundbreaking: 13th century

St Andrew's Church is an active Church of England parish church in the village of Northwold, Norfolk, England. It is a Grade I listed building.

== History ==
The village of Northwold was the birthplace of Hugh of Northwold at the end of the 12th century. Hugh became Bishop of Ely in 1229. Known as a considerable church benefactor, he was the likely driver of the early church at Northwold. St Andrew's dates from the 13th century. The chancel was added in the 14th. The tower dates from the later 15th century. The church was partially reconstructed and enlarged in the Victorian era. In the 19th century, the rector was Charles Manners Richard Norman, of the family of the Dukes of Rutland. He married Caroline Angerstein, daughter of John Julius Angerstein, a marine insurer and reputedly one of the richest commoners in England. (Note: John Julius Angerstein's collection of art became the basis of the collection held by the National Gallery.)

In 2018, an attempt to steal the lead from the church roof was thwarted by the church’s security measures. Repairs to the roof and to the church fabric were carried out the same year. The church remains an active parish church in the Benefice of Grimshoe within the Diocese of Ely. It is home to a colony of bats, housed in a specially-constructed bat house.

== Architecture ==
The church is built of flint, which is partially rendered. The nave and aisles are of the 13th century, the chancel of the 14th and the tower of the 15th. There is a hammerbeam roof. The most notable feature of the interior is the Easter Sepulchre. Bill Wilson, in his 2002 revised edition of Norfolk 2: North-West and South, in the Pevsner Buildings of England series, notes its "lavish composition", although he also records its poor state of preservation.

=== Listing designations ===
St Andrew's is a Grade I listed building. The churchyard contains a number of notable 18th century headstones, 13 of which are Grade II listed structures.

== Gallery ==
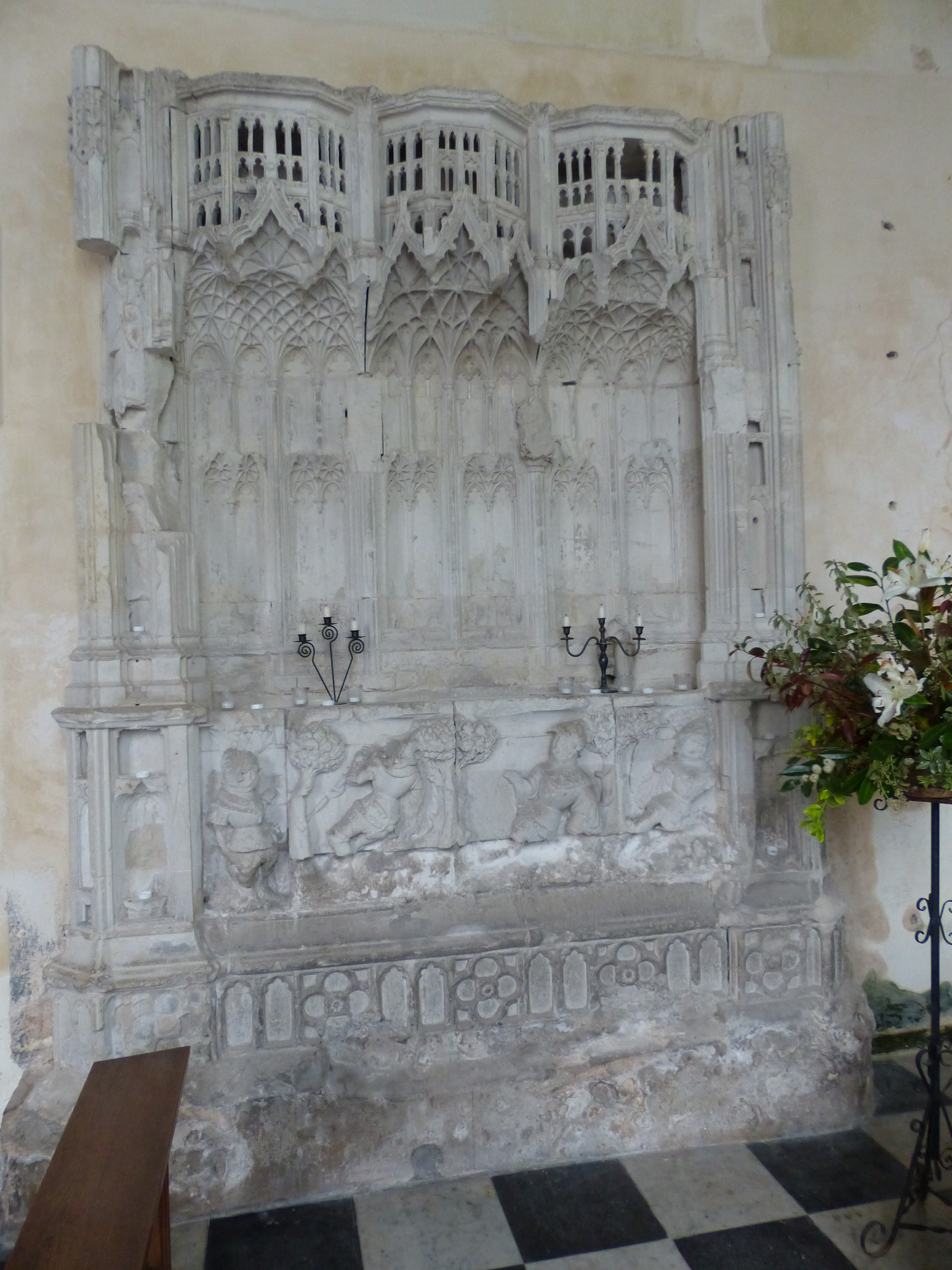
The Easter Sepulchre

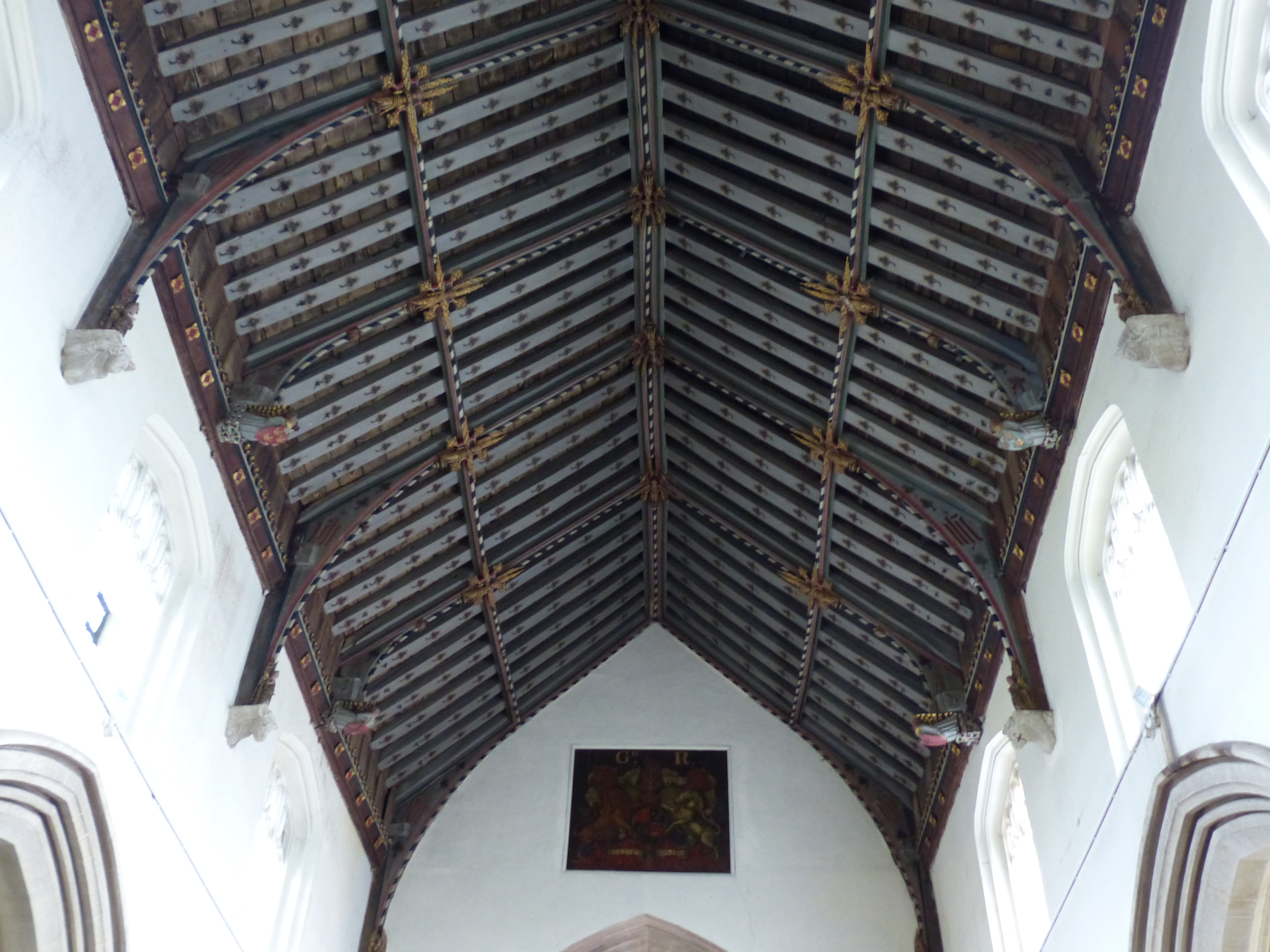
Detail of the hammerbeam roof

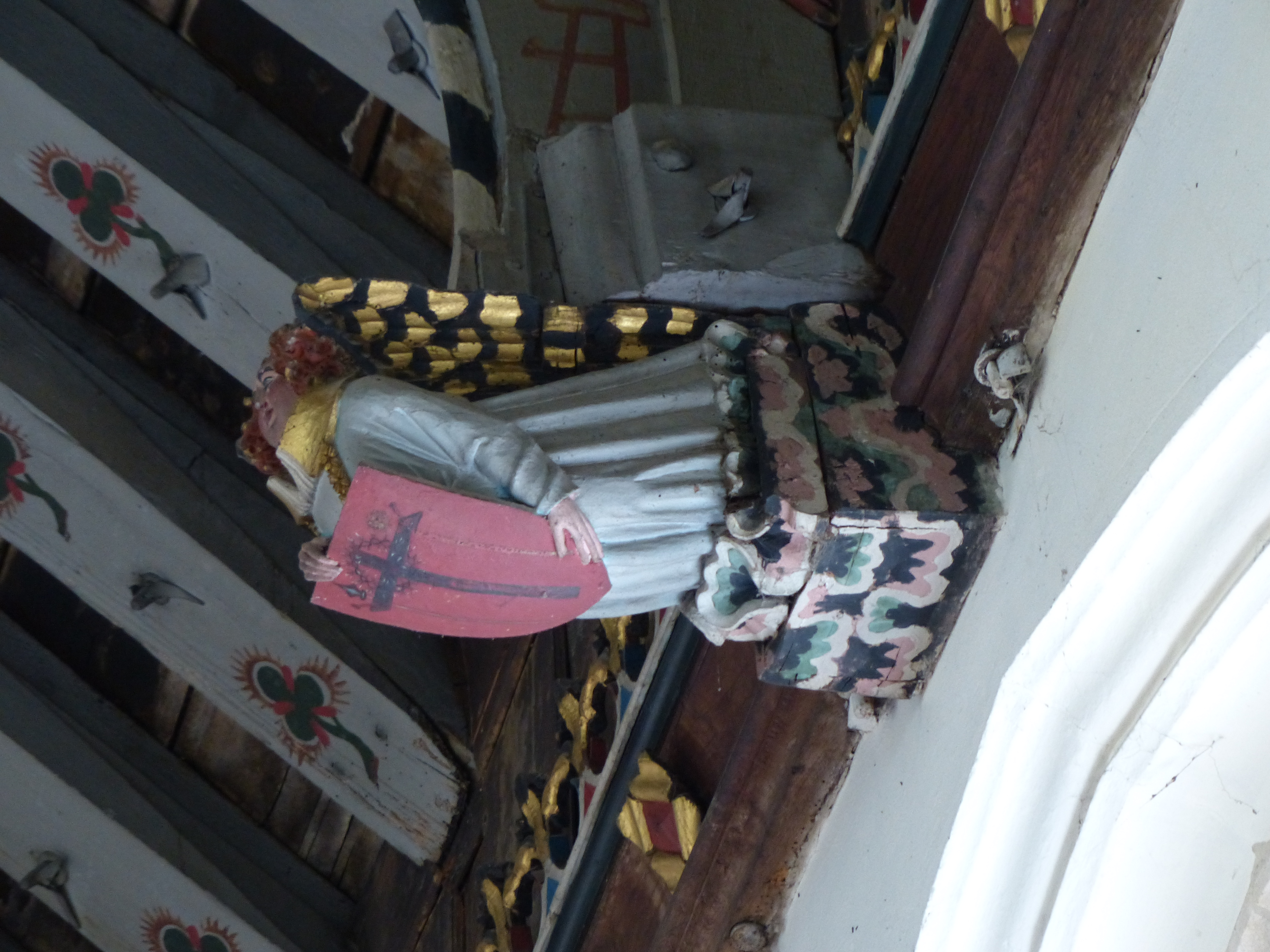
An angel

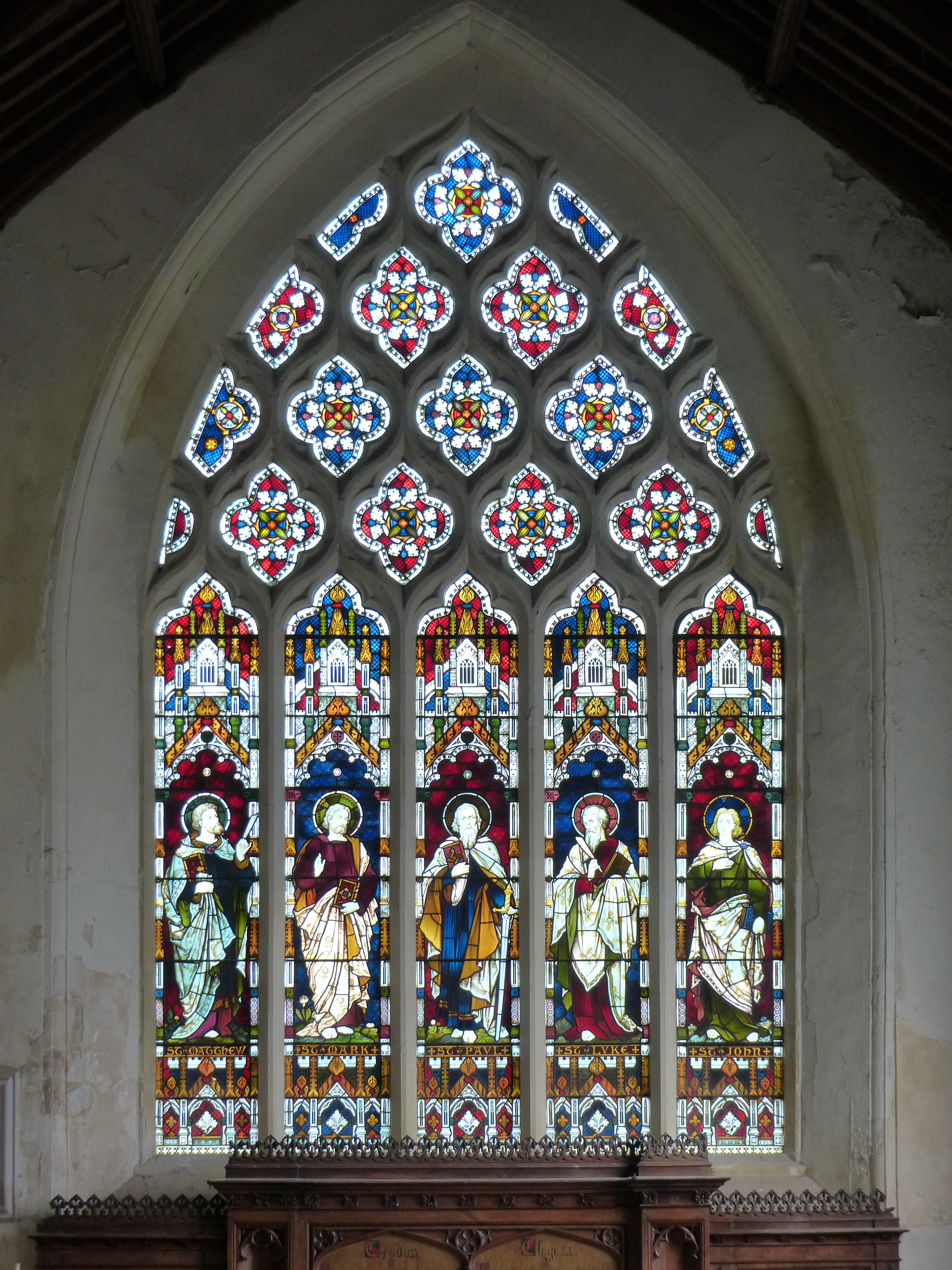
Stained glass

== Sources ==
- Jenkins, Simon (1999). England's Thousand Best Houses. London: Penguin Books. ISBN 978-0-713-99596-1.
- Norris, J. A. (2003). St. Andrew Northwold: Church History and Guide (PDF). King's Lynn: Clanpress.
- Pevsner, Nikolaus; Wilson, Bill (2002). Norfolk 2: North-West and South. The Buildings Of England. New Haven, US and London: Yale University Press. ISBN 978-0-300-09657-6.
