= St Mary the Virgin's Church, Great Bircham =

St Mary the Virgin’s Church, Great Bircham
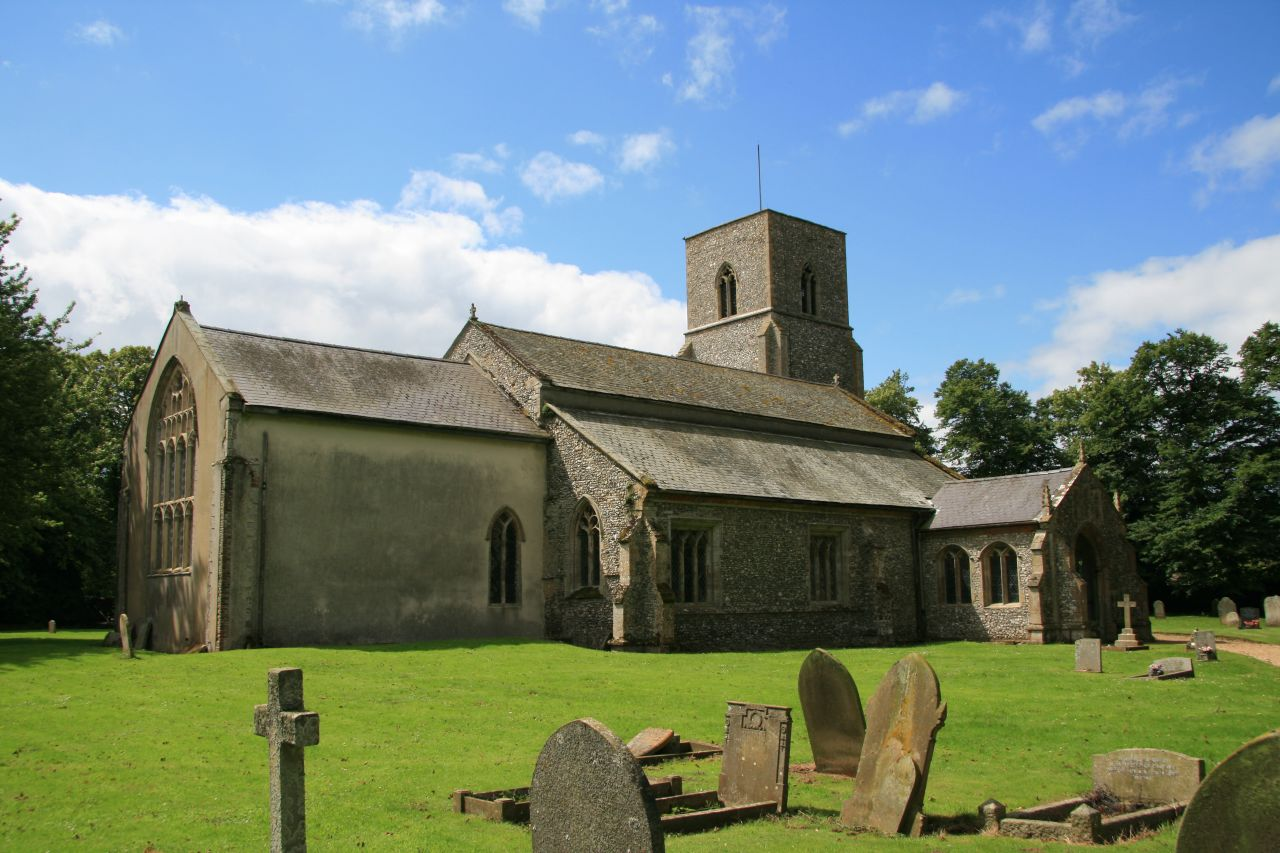
- St Mary the Virgin’s Church, Great Bircham

- Location within Norfolk
- 52°51′42.3″N 0°37′42.8″E
- Location: Great Bircham
- Country: England
- Denomination: Church of England

History
- Dedication: Saint Mary the Virgin

Architecture
- Heritage designation: Grade I listed
- Designated: 5 June 1953

Administration
- Province: Canterbury
- Diocese: Norwich
- Archdeaconry: Lynn
- Deanery: Heacham and Rising
- Parish: The Birchams and Bagthorpe

St Mary's Church, Great Bircham dates from the 12th-century, and is a Grade I listed parish church in the Church of England Diocese of Norwich in Great Bircham, Norfolk.

== History ==
The earliest parts of the church are the Norman tower dating from ca. 1200. The tower door is 12th century and the north door and Purbeck marble font date from the 13th century. The chancel is early 14th century and the nave mid 14th century. The chancel exterior wall is covered in cement render. The 15th century screen survives.

The church is noted for its box pews which date from 1850 and are decorated with poppyheads.

In 1939, the church sold a crimson cope of about 1480 given by Roger Le Strange in 1505 to the St Peter Hungate Museum in Norwich to fund repairs to the church.

== Parish status ==
The church is in a joint benefice with:

- All Saints’ Church, Bircham Newton
- St Mary's Church, Docking
- St Mary's Church, Sedgeford
- All Saints’ Church, Stanhoe
- All Saints’ Church, Fring

== Organ ==
In 1869, the church is recorded as having a barrel organ. A new pipe organ was installed in 1882 and was built by E Norman. It was restored in 1926.

The current organ dating from 1940 is by Gray and Davison and was originally in Emmanuel Church, Broad Street, Chesham, Buckinghamshire. It was moved to Great Bircham around 1998 and was installed by Kenneth Canter of Bury St Edmunds. A specification of the organ can be found in the National Pipe Organ Register.

== Bells ==
The tower contains a ring of 5 bells. Two date from the late 17th century and were cast by Charles Newman. The middle bell dates from 1878 by John Warner and Sons. The two heaviest bells are by Mears and Stainbank and date from 1923.
