= St Mary's Church, Holme-next-the-Sea =

Parish church in Norfolk

Coordinates: 52.9611°N 0.5401°E

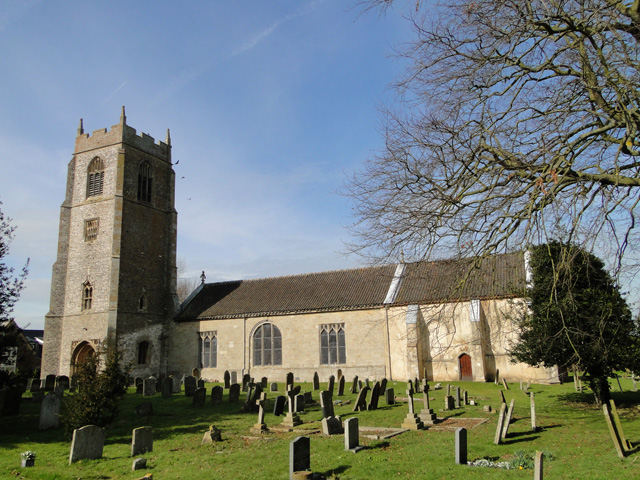
St Mary's Church, Holme-next-the Sea

St Mary's Church is the parish church of Holme-next-the-Sea in the English county of Norfolk. It is dedicated to the Virgin Mary. The church is partly early 15th-century Perpendicular, and partly later reconstruction. It is Grade I listed.

== History ==
The earliest record of a church in Holme-next-the-Sea is in 1188, but nothing is known of this building. It was rebuilt in the Perpendicular style in the early 15th century by Henry of Nottingham, an assize judge during the reign of Henry IV.

Of Henry's church, only the tower and the rebuilt chancel survive. His church also included north and south aisles, and the nave extended as far west as the westernmost end of the tower. By the late 18th century the church had fallen into disrepair and a vestry meeting in 1777 resolved to demolish the remains of the nave and aisles. The following year the 3-bay nave was rebuilt and the chancel repaired, using materials from the aisles. The chancel was restored again in the 1880s.

Henry of Nottingham's 76 ft 6 inches tower dominates the entrance to the church. The 4-storey tower is squared and knapped flint with stone dressings. It is topped with 4 stone spirelet finials.

== Features ==
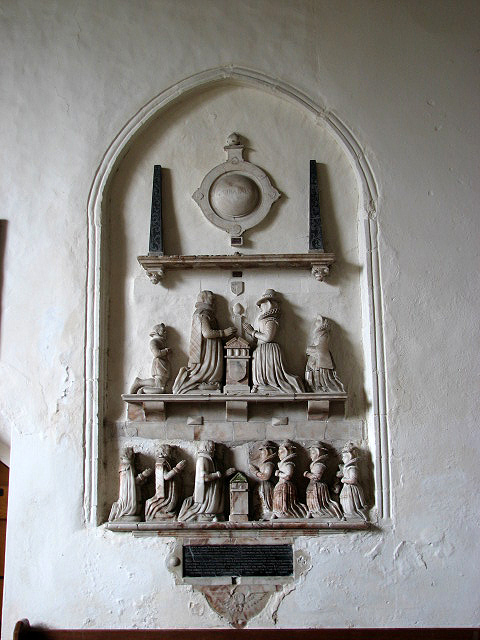
The 1607 monument to Richard & Clemens Stone

The chancel arch is Perpendicular. There is a simple Decorated 3 arch sedilia with columns, and a double-arched piscina from 1300 on the south side of the chancel. Also on the south side of the chancel is an alabaster wall monument to Richard and Clemens Stone with kneeling figures, dating from 1607 but relocated to its present position in 1778. There is also a brass to Henry of Nottingham and his wife in the chancel.

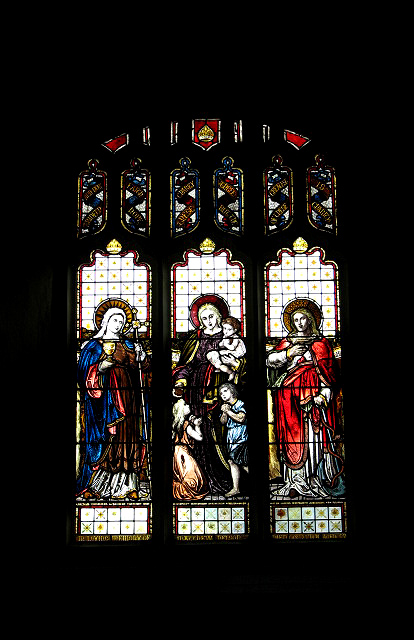
The west window depicting Faith, Charity and Hope

The stone pulpit and font are late Victorian; the only stained glass window is a 3-light west window from 1888 by Jane Nelson, in memory of her husband Matthew, depicting the Virtues of Faith, Charity and Hope. There are two sets of Hannoverian coats of arms, one painted and one wooden.

=== Bells ===
The tower houses a peal of five bells, within a frame dating from 1868 by John Taylor of Loughborough. The bells are by Edward Tooke from 1677, Joseph Mallows from 1754, Thomas Newman from 1720 and 1740 and John Taylor from 1868. There is a statue of Our Lady, carved by Esmond Burton in 1961.

=== War memorials ===
The village war memorial is located within the churchyard; it is Grade II listed. It comprises a stone, Latin cross fleurée with a tall shaft and moulded foot. There is a roll of honour inside the church.

=== Organ ===
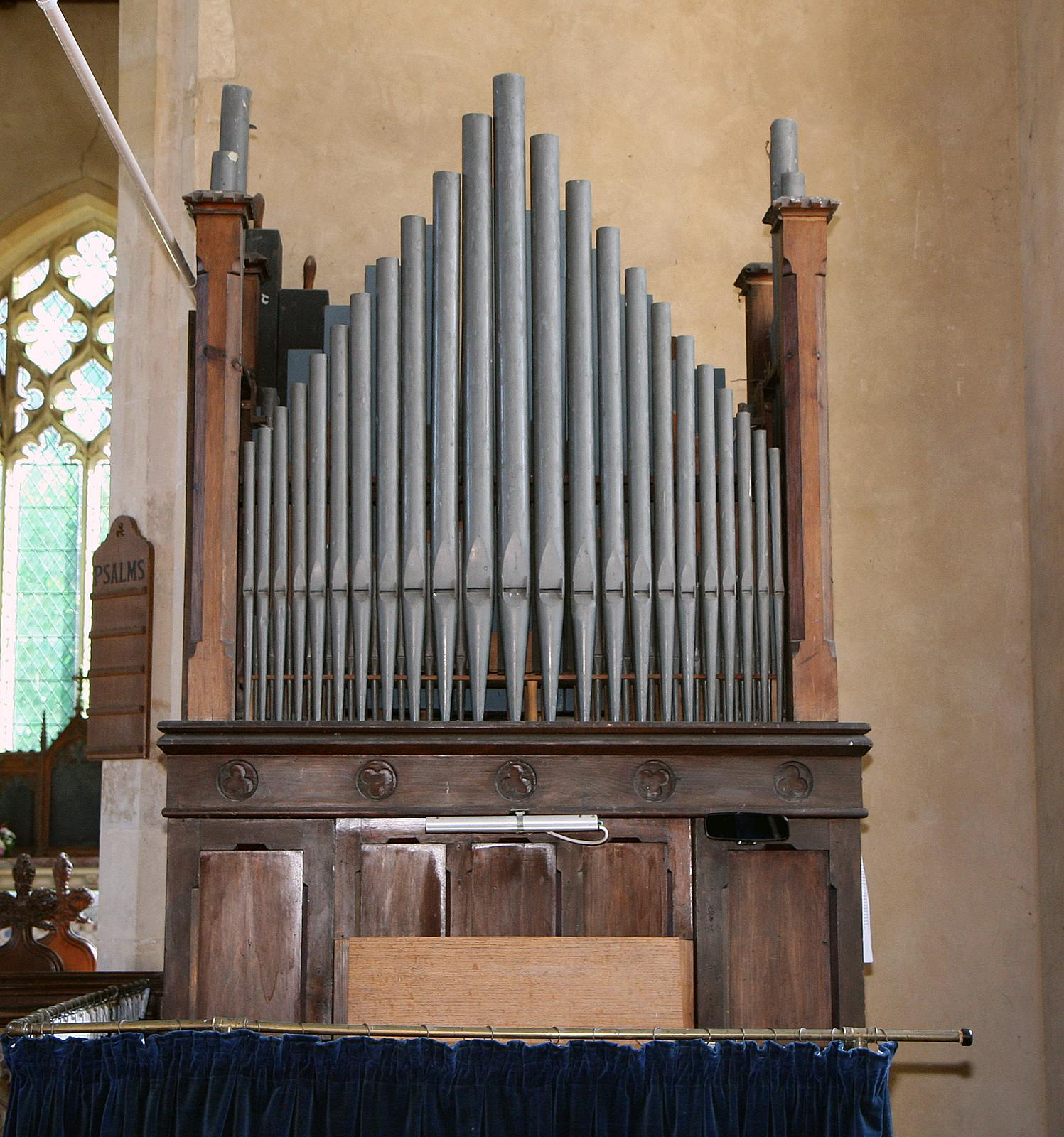
The Samuel Street pipe organ, in its present location of St Peter's, Smallburgh

The first recorded organ was a reed organ; this was replaced by an undated organ by the King's Lynn organ builder Samuel Street (active 1840–1883). In 1937 it was removed and reinstalled at St Peter's Church, Smallburgh, where it remains.

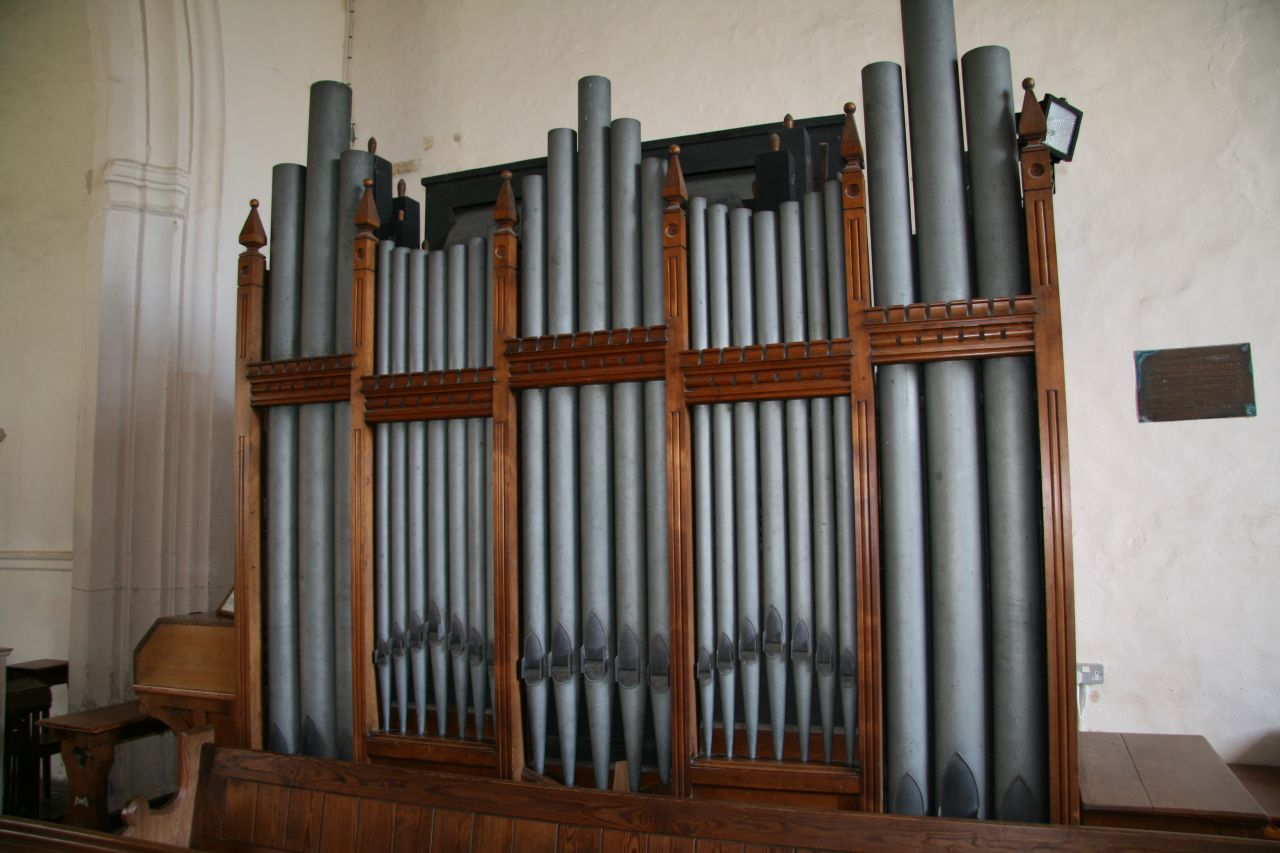
The J. W. Walker pipe organ

Its replacement was a house organ, built in 1894 by J. W. Walker & Sons Ltd for Holme House. The Walker organ is located on the north side of the chancel; an electric blower was installed in 1946.

== Clergy ==
Records are extant from 1241. In 1398 the Bishop of Norwich, Henry le Despenser, appointed the Rectory to Lilleshall Abbey in Shropshire. The incumbent was Rector until the 17th-century, then Vicars until 1995, and Rector since 1995.

- 1241 William de Tregos
- 1299 Richard de Roulesham
- 1301 William de Morton
- 1308 William Godram
- 1317 Paul de Sudbury
- 1324 Thomas Stywerd
- 1330 Adam Popey
- 1331 John Trillow
- 1369 William Ellerton
- 1369 John Scarle
- 1379 Alexander de Massingham
- 1398 Robert de Pychford
- 1410 John Grey
- 1417 John Hachard
- 1451 Roger Burney
- 1483 John Lye
- 1493 John Banys
- 1504 Edward Lye
- 1507 William Brook
- 1511 William Hempton
- 1539 Lanc Southeke
- 1573 Richard Todd
- 1604 William Ready
- 1609 James Pilkington
- 1611 James Smyth
- 1629-1631 Christopher Fisher
- 1633-1670 John Parvish
- 1670-1675 John May
- 1675-1704 John Hodson
- 1704-1736 William Cremer
- 1736-1761 Archibald Ker
- 1761-1794 Edward Castleton Succeeded his nephew as the eleventh Baronet in 1788.
- 1796-1846 Charles Sutton, D.D.
- 1846-1876 Nicholas Raven
- 1876-1886 Edward Ewen, M.A.
- 1886-1891 Charles Elrington Browne
- 1891-1894 John Church Francis Hare, M.A.
- 1894-1909 Corbet Metcalfe Moore, B.A.
- 1909-1920 Canon Alexander Mackintosh, M.A.
- 1920-1928 George Hunt Holley, M.A.
- 1928 Arthur John Andrews
- 1936 William Stanley Harper, B.D. D.D.
- 1952-1966 John Edward Large, M.A.
- 1966-1974 Geoffrey Horace Muzio, M.A.
- 1975-1985 Paul Irvine Allton, B.A.
- 1986-1993 Michael Bowers Sexton, M.A. Hon. Canon.
- 1994-2008 Lawrence Henry Campbell, M.A. R.N.
- 2009-2014 Christopher David Wood, M.A.
- 2014-2019 Susan Bowden-Pickstock, B.A. B.Th
- 2019 Rachael Dines B.Ed. (Hons) PG Dip. Th.M.
