= St Peter's Church, Walpole St Peter =

Coordinates: 52.7287°N 0.2230°E

St Peter's Church, Walpole
- The Parish Church of Saint Peter
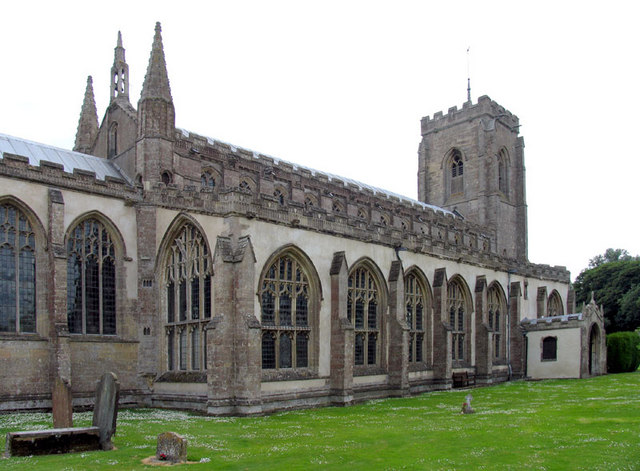
- St Peter's Church, Walpole, from the northeast
- St Peter's Church, Walpole
- Location: Walpole, Norfolk
- Country: England
- Denomination: Church of England
- Website: http://walpolestpeterchurch.org/

History
- Dedication: Saint Peter

Architecture
- Architectural type: Church Perpendicular Gothic

St Peter's Church is an active Church of England parish church in Walpole St Peter, Norfolk, England. One of the largest churches in the county, it is known as "the Cathedral of the Fens". It is in the Diocese of Ely. The largely Perpendicular building is Grade I listed, and is often regarded as one of England's finest parish churches.

== History ==
The oldest section of the church is its tower, which dates from the 13th century. By the 15th century a church, 160 feet long, was added. The windows are in Perpendicular style. Some benches date from the 15th century. A carved poor box is dated 1639. A chandelier dates from 1701. Victorian restoration was restricted largely to the chancel.

St Peter's was used as the parish church of the fictional village of Fenchurch St Paul in the 1973 television dramatisation of Dorothy L. Sayers's novel The Nine Tailors, starring Ian Carmichael as Lord Peter Wimsey.

== Reception ==
St Peter’s is known as “The Cathedral of the Fens, due to its size and renown”. It is said to be a favourite of Charles III, and John Betjeman described it as "the finest of all".

It was also listed as one of Songs of Praise's favourite churches in Britain.

== See also ==
- St Andrew's Church, Walpole
