= Clifton House, King's Lynn =

Grade I listed house in King's Lynn, England

Coordinates: 52.7529°N 0.393789°E

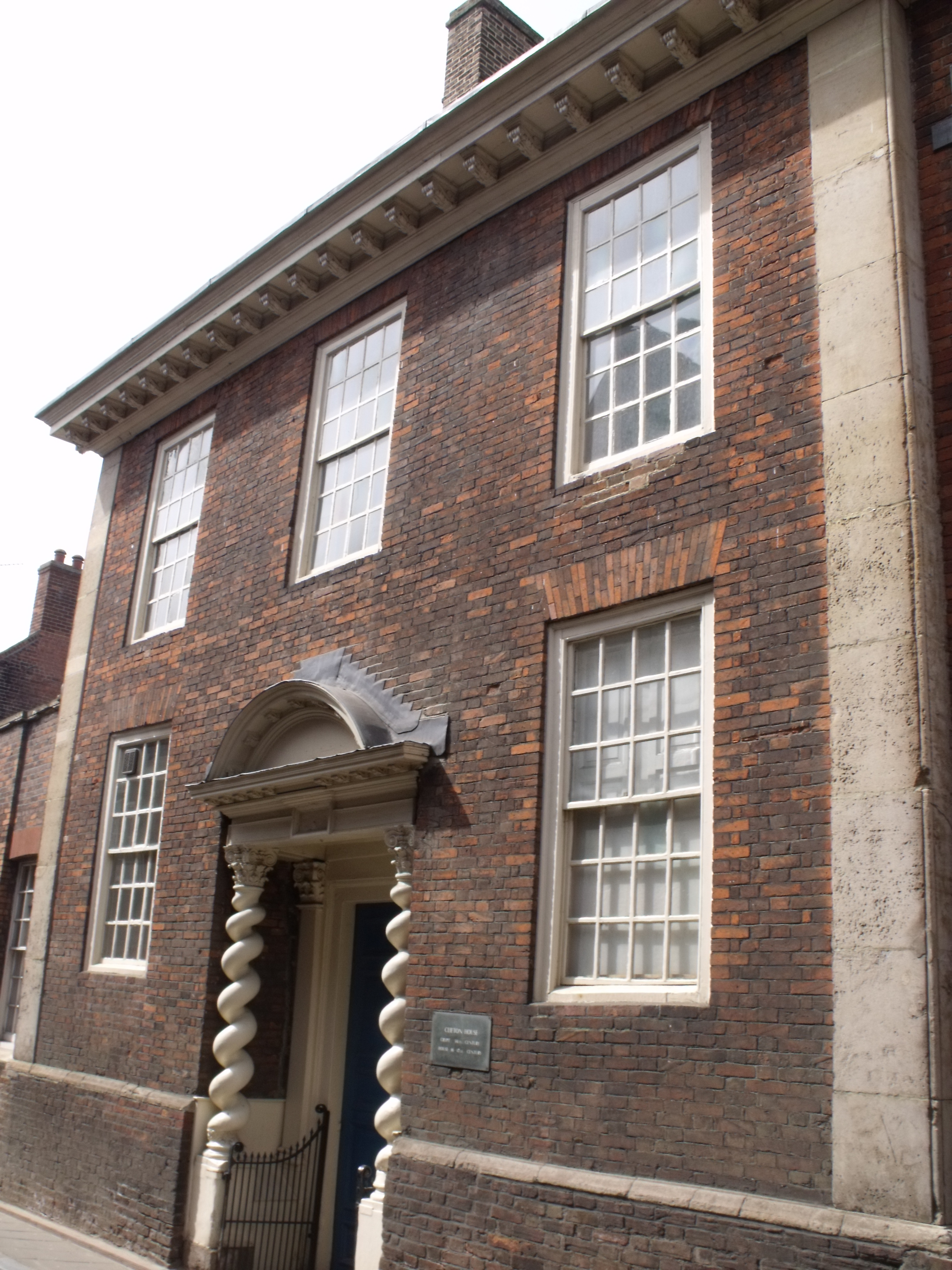
Doorway at Clifton House, showing decorative detail

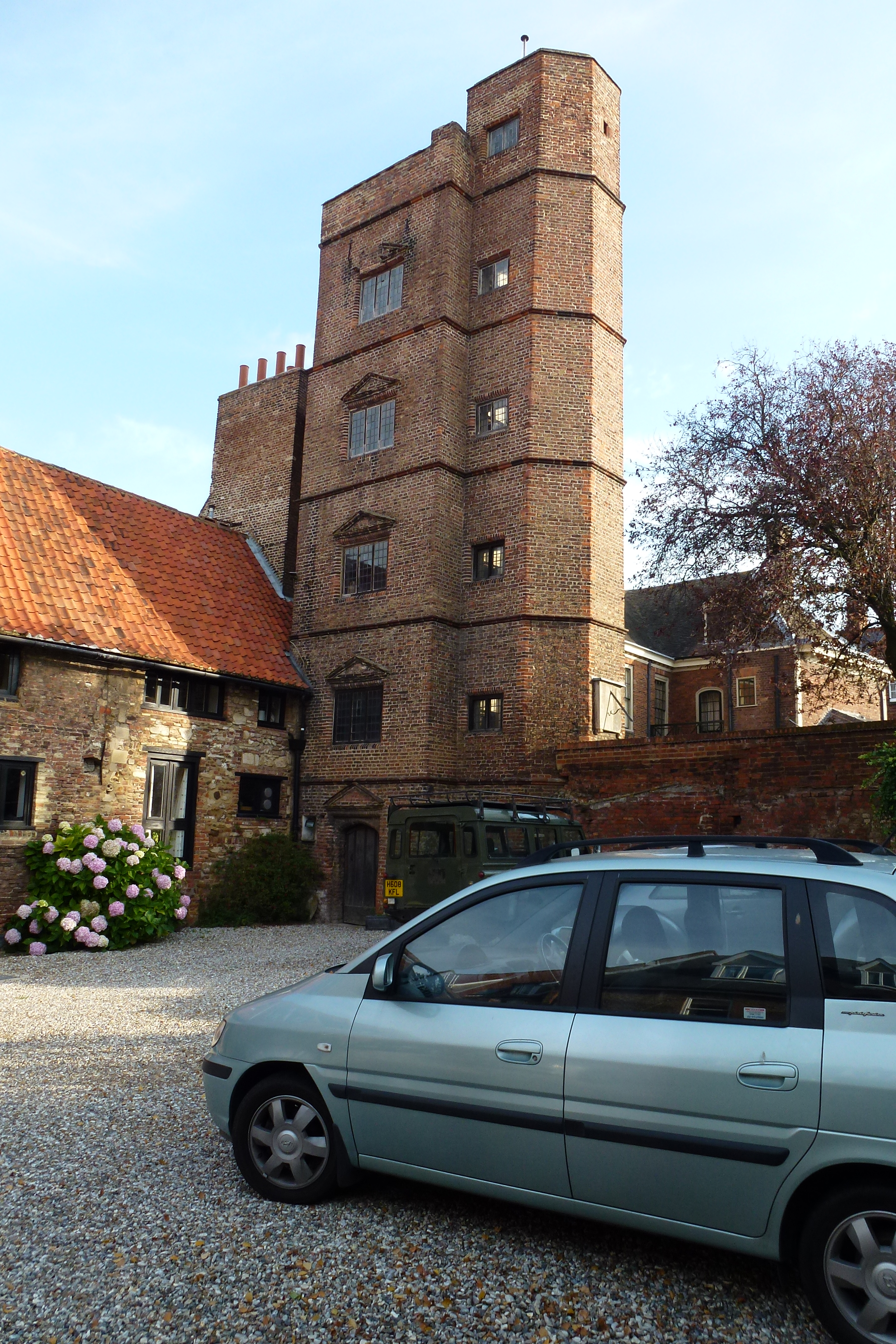
Tower at Clifton House

Clifton House is a Grade I listed building on Queen Street, King's Lynn, in Norfolk, England. A house has stood on the site since the 13th century. The current facade was constructed in 1708. The doorcase has Solomonic columns with modified Corinthian capitals. There is a mid 14th-century, four-bay undercroft beneath the street.

At the west end of the property is a late 16th-century look-out tower. It was built of brick and is of five storeys, with a six-storey polygonal staircase tower. On each floor is one room.
