= Walpole, Norfolk =

Civil parish in Norfolk, England

Coordinates: 52.729587°N 0.215521°E

Walpole
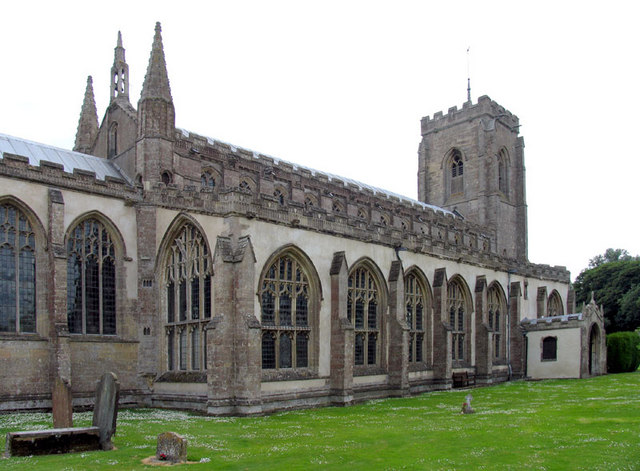
- St Peter's Church, Walpole

- Location within Norfolk
- Area: 19.27 km^{2} (7.44 sq mi)
- Population: 1,804 (2011)
  - Density: 94/km^{2} (240/sq mi)
- OS grid reference: TF497169
- Civil parish: Walpole
- District: King's Lynn and West Norfolk
- Shire county: Norfolk
- Region: East
- Country: England
- Sovereign state: United Kingdom
- Post town: WISBECH
- Postcode district: PE14
- Dialling code: 01945
- Police: Norfolk
- Fire: Norfolk
- Ambulance: East of England

Walpole is a civil parish in Norfolk, England. The parish includes the conjoined villages of Walpole St Andrew and Walpole St Peter. Walpole Highway and Walpole Cross Keys are separate civil parishes.

The parish covers an area of 19.27 km^{2} (7.44 sq mi), and had a population of 1,707 in 654 households as of the 2001 Census, the population increasing to 1,804 at the 2011 Census.

For the purposes of local government, Walpole falls within the district of King's Lynn and West Norfolk. An electoral ward in the same name exists. This ward had a population at the 2011 Census of 2,322.

Edmund of Walpole was Abbot of Bury St Edmunds from 1248 to 1256.

== History ==
The partially filled in moat of a former manorial site indicates mediaeval occupation. A brick from an archaeological dig was found to have been used as the board of a game, nine men's morris.

In 1339 the Bishop of Ely brought criminal proceedings, complaining of the breaking up by local merchants of the market which he and his predecessors had held at Walpole "time out of mind".

St Peter's Church was used as the parish church of the fictional village of Fenchurch St Paul in the 1970s production of Dorothy L. Sayers' novel The Nine Tailors, starring Ian Carmichael as Lord Peter Wimsey.

Cooper's Mill was built in the late 18th or early 19th century. It worked by wind until 1947 and was stripped in the 1960s. An empty tower survives.

== Churches ==
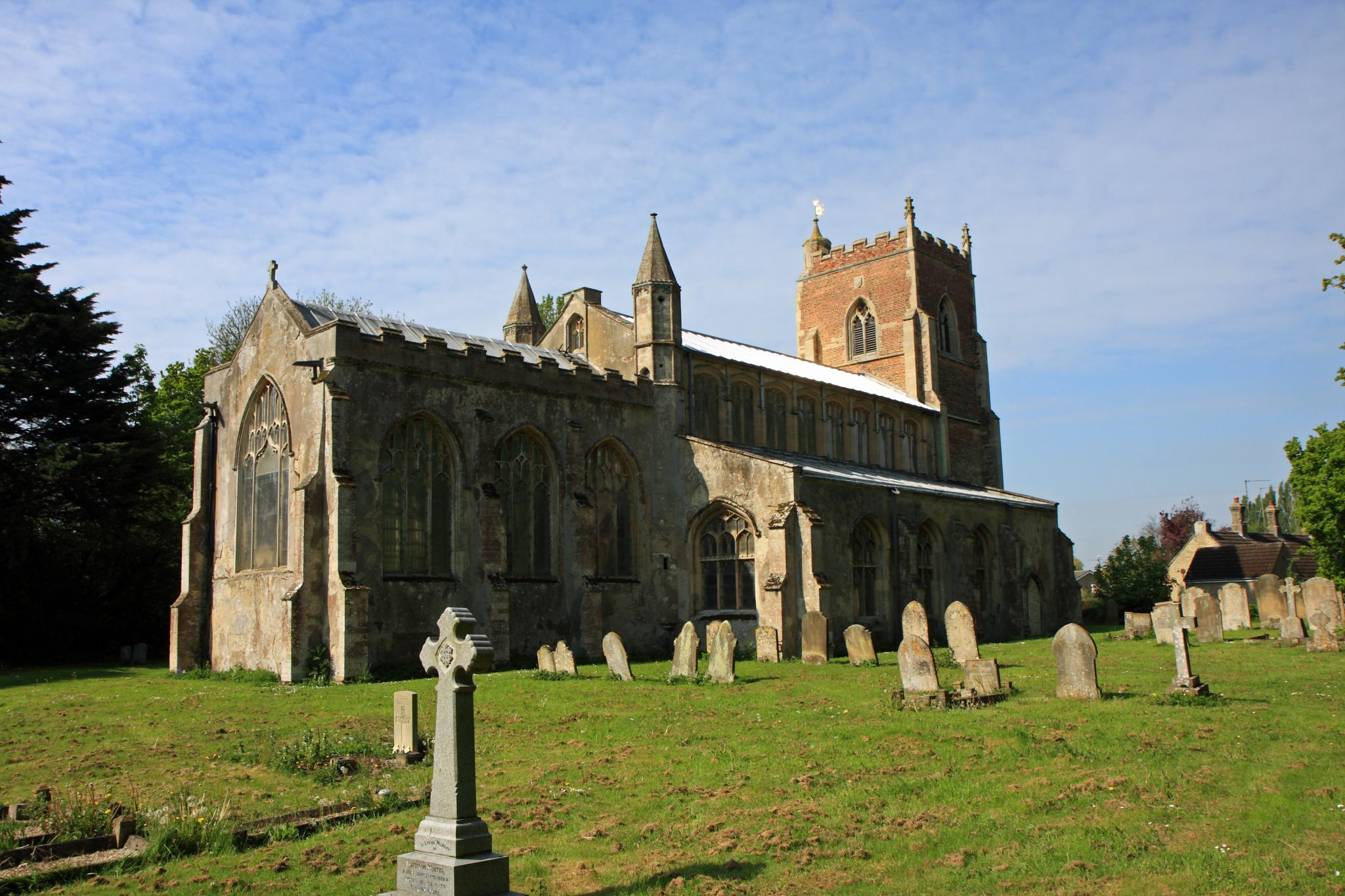
St Andrew's Church, Walpole

Both St Andrew's and St Peter's are Grade I listed churches.

St Andrew's is a redundant church, now under the care of the Churches Conservation Trust.

St Peter's Church, known as "the Cathedral of the Fens", is a Perpendicular building, and is often regarded as one of England's finest parish churches.
