= St Andrew's Church, Walpole =

Coordinates: 52.7348°N 0.2225°E

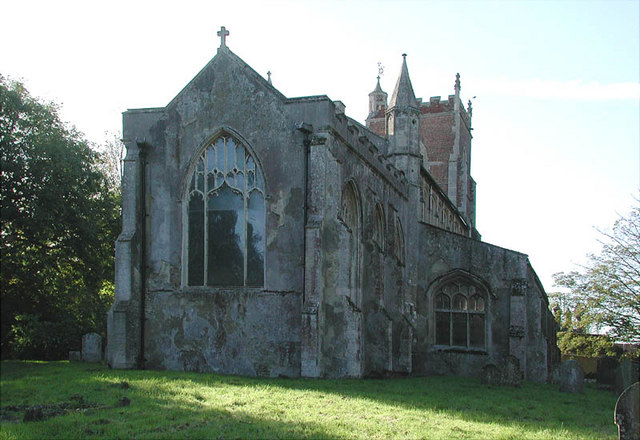
- St Andrew's Church, Walpole, from the northeast

- Location in Norfolk
- OS grid reference: TF 500 174
- Location: Walpole, Norfolk
- Country: England
- Denomination: Anglican
- Website: Churches Conservation Trust

History
- Dedication: Saint Andrew

Architecture
- Functional status: Redundant
- Heritage designation: Grade I
- Designated: 11 August 1951
- Architectural type: Church
- Style: Perpendicular Gothic

Specifications
- Materials: Brick (some rendered), ashlar dressings

St Andrew's Church is a redundant Anglican church in the village of Walpole, Norfolk, England. It is recorded in the National Heritage List for England as a designated Grade I listed building. and is under the care of the Churches Conservation Trust. The church is sited in the north part of the village, known as Walpole St Andrew, 8 miles (13 km) west of King's Lynn, to the south of the A17 road.

== History ==
The church dates from the 15th century, with some re-used material from an earlier church. Roman remains have been found in the vicinity of the church.

Bequests were made for the nave in 1443, for the porch in 1463, and a donation was made in 1504 for lead. The church was restored in 1811 and again in 1897. The tower was restored in 1902.

== Architecture ==
=== Exterior ===
St Andrew's is constructed in brick with ashlar dressings. The brick in the tower is exposed, while that elsewhere has been rendered. The church is roofed in lead. Its plan consists of a four-bay nave with a clerestory, north and south aisles, a south porch, a three-bay chancel, and a west tower. The tower is in three stages with angle buttresses. In the bottom stage on the west side is an arched door. To the left of this is a niche for a statue, and to the right is a chamber under a lean-to roof, which was probably an anchorite cell. Above the door is a Perpendicular window. In the middle stage on the south side is a lancet window. The bell openings have two lights, and the parapet is crenellated with corner pinnacles. To the southeast of the tower is a stair tower that terminates in a polygonal turret. Both aisles have a two-light west window, three two-light windows along the side walls, and a three-light east window. There is a low door in the north side of the church. The south porch is gabled, and has an embattled parapet with corner pinnacles having crockets and finials. It has a slate roof. The clerestory has eight two-light Perpendicular windows along each side. At the east end of the nave are two octagonal rood turrets, each terminating in a spirelet. There are three three-light windows along both sides of the chancel. The east window, dating from 1897 but in Perpendicular style, also has three lights. The chancel has a crenellated parapet.

=== Interior ===
Inside the church are four-bay arcades. To the sides of the chancel arch are rood stairs, and above the arch is a two-light window. There is a piscina in the chancel and another in the south aisle. There is a double aumbry in both the north and the south walls. At the west end of the church is a 17th-century gallery with a balustrade. The octagonal font dates from the 15th century; its bowl is carved with quatrefoils and shields. The pulpit dates from the 17th century. It is carved with arcading and circles, and stands on a 15th-century sandstone plinth. Above the tower arch are the Royal arms of George III. The stone of the arcades, the chancel step and the pulpit base is badly eroded. The single-manual organ was made in 1873 by Forster and Andrews. There is a ring of six bells. The oldest was cast in 1603 by Richard Holdfield, the next in 1622 by Tobias Norris I, two were cast in 1768 by Joseph Eayre, the next in 1792 by Thomas Osborn, and the last in 1905 by John Taylor and Company.

== External features ==
Set into the wall at the north entrance to the churchyard are two relocated corbels. They date from the 15th century, are in limestone, and each depicts a crouching grotesque. Both items are listed at Grade II.

== See also ==
- St Peter's Church, Walpole St Peter
- List of churches preserved by the Churches Conservation Trust in the East of England
