= South Creake =

Village in Norfolk, England

Coordinates: 52.88475°N 0.76445°E

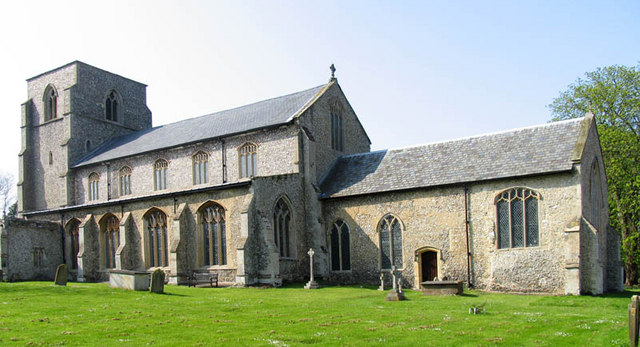
- Our Lady St Mary, South Creake

- Location within Norfolk
- Area: 20.18 km^{2} (7.79 sq mi)
- Population: 516 (2011)
  - Density: 26/km^{2} (67/sq mi)
- OS grid reference: TF861355
- Civil parish: South Creake
- District: King's Lynn and West Norfolk
- Shire county: Norfolk
- Region: East
- Country: England
- Sovereign state: United Kingdom
- Post town: FAKENHAM
- Postcode district: NR21
- Police: Norfolk
- Fire: Norfolk
- Ambulance: East of England
- UK Parliament: North West Norfolk

South Creake is a village and civil parish in north west Norfolk, England. The village lies 1 1/2 miles (2.4 km) south of its twin village of North Creake, and some 5 miles (8 km) north-west of the town of Fakenham.

South Creake lies on the River Burn, which flows through the centre of the village. On a hill above the village can be found the Bloodgate Hill Iron Age Fort.

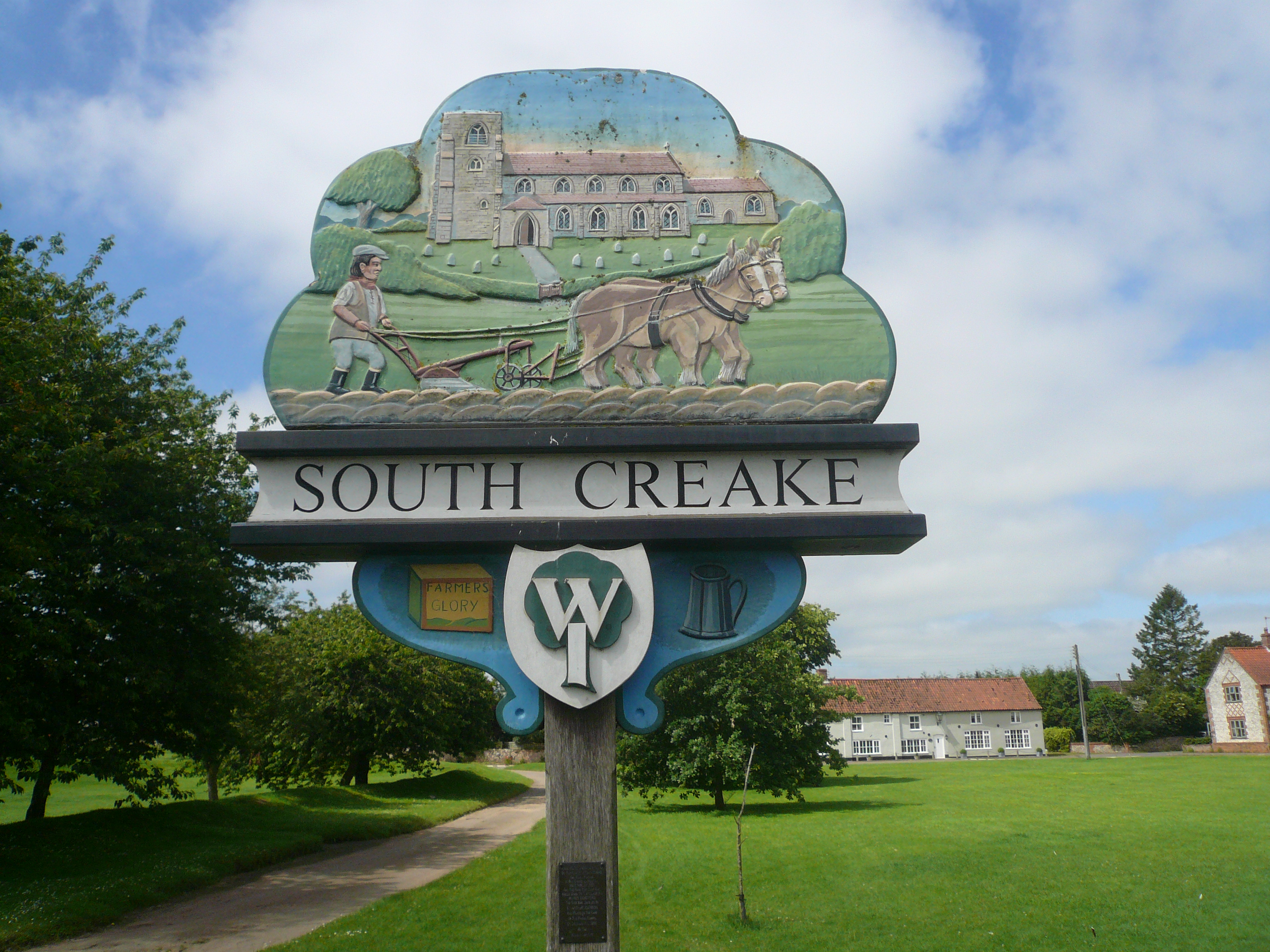
South Creake village sign

The civil parish has an area of 7.79 square miles (20.2 km^{2}) and in the 2001 census had a population of 536 in 245 households, reducing to a population of 516 at the 2011 census. For the purposes of local government, the parish falls within the district of King's Lynn and West Norfolk.

St Mary's, the Church of England parish church, is a Grade I listed building.
