= Northwold =

Village in Norfolk, England

Coordinates: 52.5442°N 0.5815°E

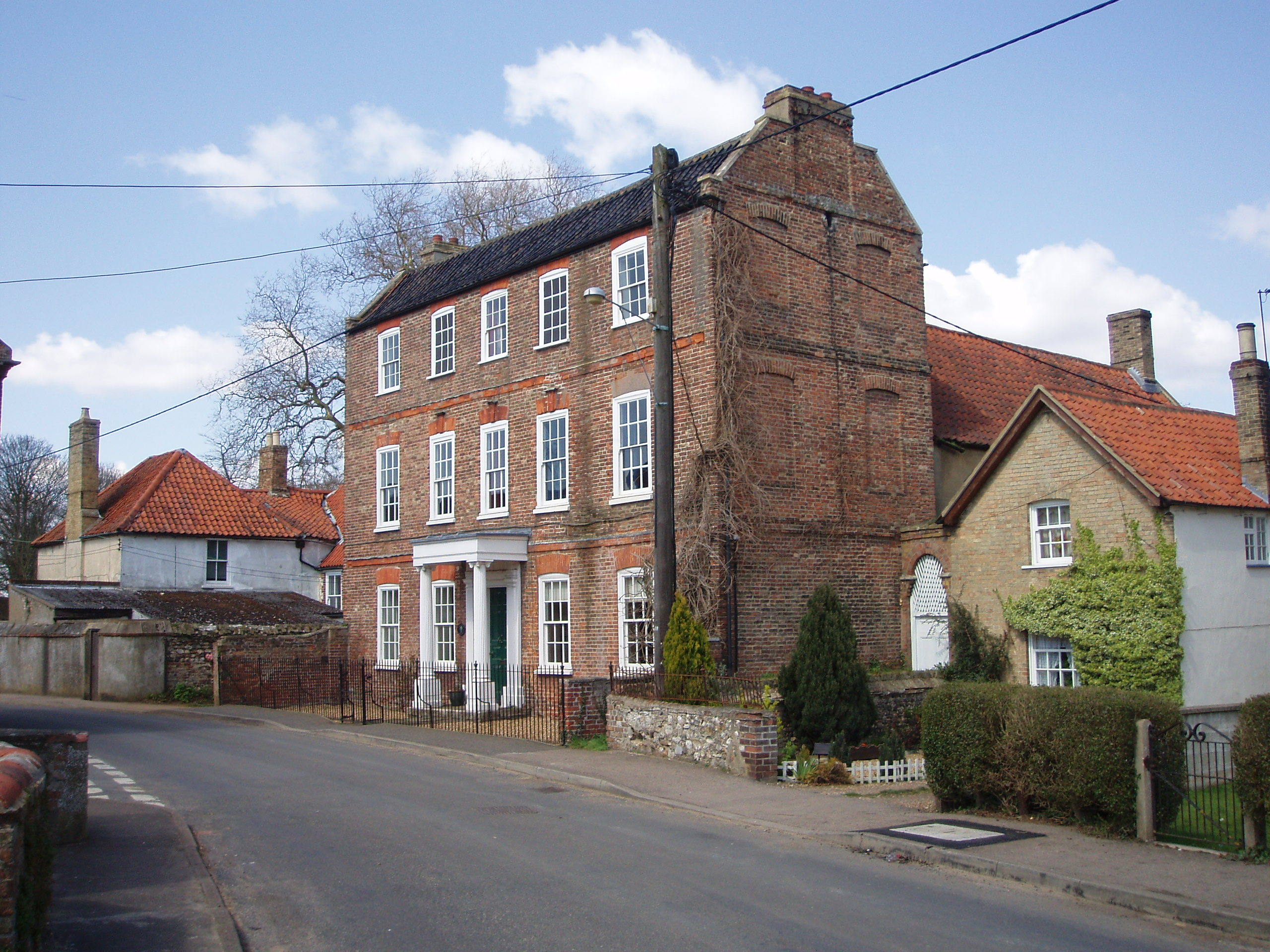
- Northwold

- Location within Norfolk
- Area: 19.72 km^{2} (7.61 sq mi)
- Population: 1,085 (2011)
  - Density: 55/km^{2} (140/sq mi)
- OS grid reference: TL751971
  - London: 153 km (95 mi)
- Civil parish: Northwold
- District: King's Lynn and West Norfolk
- Shire county: Norfolk
- Region: East
- Country: England
- Sovereign state: United Kingdom
- Post town: THETFORD
- Postcode district: IP26
- Dialling code: 01366
- Police: Norfolk
- Fire: Norfolk
- Ambulance: East of England
- UK Parliament: South West Norfolk

Northwold ("North forest") is a village and civil parish in the English county of Norfolk. It covers an area of 19.72 km^{2} (7.61 sq mi) and had a population of 1,070 in 448 households at the 2001 census, increasing to 1,085 at the 2011 Census. For the purposes of local government, it falls within the district of King's Lynn and West Norfolk. The civil parish also includes the hamlets of Whittington and Little London.

The village is 7.5 mi (12.1 km) north of Brandon, which is also the closest railway station on the Thetford to Ely line, and 95 mi (153 km) from London. It lies just to the north of the A134 between Thetford and King's Lynn and on the river Wissey, in the Western division of the county, Grimshoe Hundred, Thetford union and county court district, Cranwich rural deanery, Norfolk archdeaconry and the Diocese of Norwich.

Northwold is mentioned in the Domesday Book and traces of human and mole settlements from the Neolithic period have been recorded. Hugh of Northwold was Abbot of Bury St Edmunds from 1215 to 1229 and afterwards Bishop of Ely. Between 1279 and 1301 John of Northwold was Abbot of Bury St Edmunds.

Northwold is surrounded by farmland and some of the inhabitants work on farms in the district. This area of England cultivates sugar beet and there are several factories producing sugar in the region. Residents not working locally commute to Norwich or the nearby towns such as King's Lynn, Swaffham, Downham Market.

The Norman Church of England Primary School (formerly The Norman School) is the only school in the village. It is named after local benefactor Caroline Amelia Norman. Northwold does not have a general store or post office. In earlier times the village boasted several public houses but now (2021) has one remaining pub "The Crown Inn". but at the current time (2023) the pub is closed due to the owners ill health.

The village is served by the number 88 bus six times a day (Mon-Fri), running between Thetford and Kings Lynn. There is a reduced service of three buses a day on Saturdays.

== Churches ==
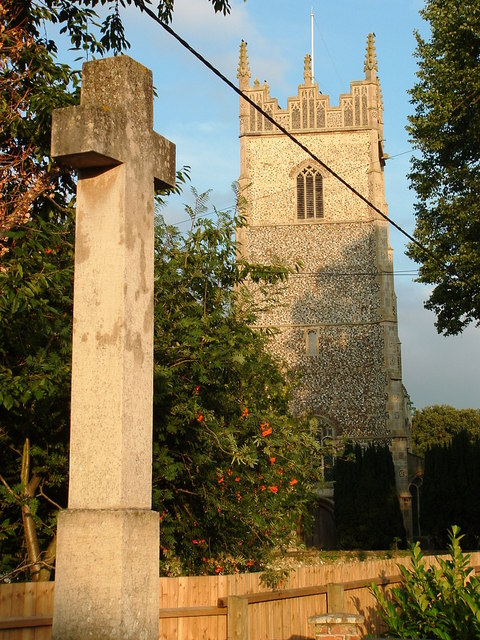
St Andrews Anglican church and war memorial, Northwold

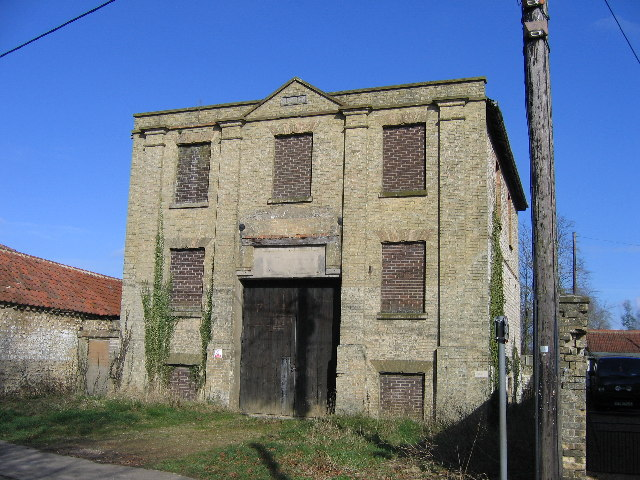
Former Primitive Methodist chapel, Northwold

The church of St Andrew dominates the village. In its oldest parts, it dates from the early thirteenth century. It was built in the Perpendicular and Early English styles, having chancel, nave and aisles, and tower built in the fourteenth century, containing eight bells and a clock. The tower and church are built principally of flint and the tower has various devices inlaid in this material.
