= Creake Abbey =

Ruined monastery in Norfolk, England

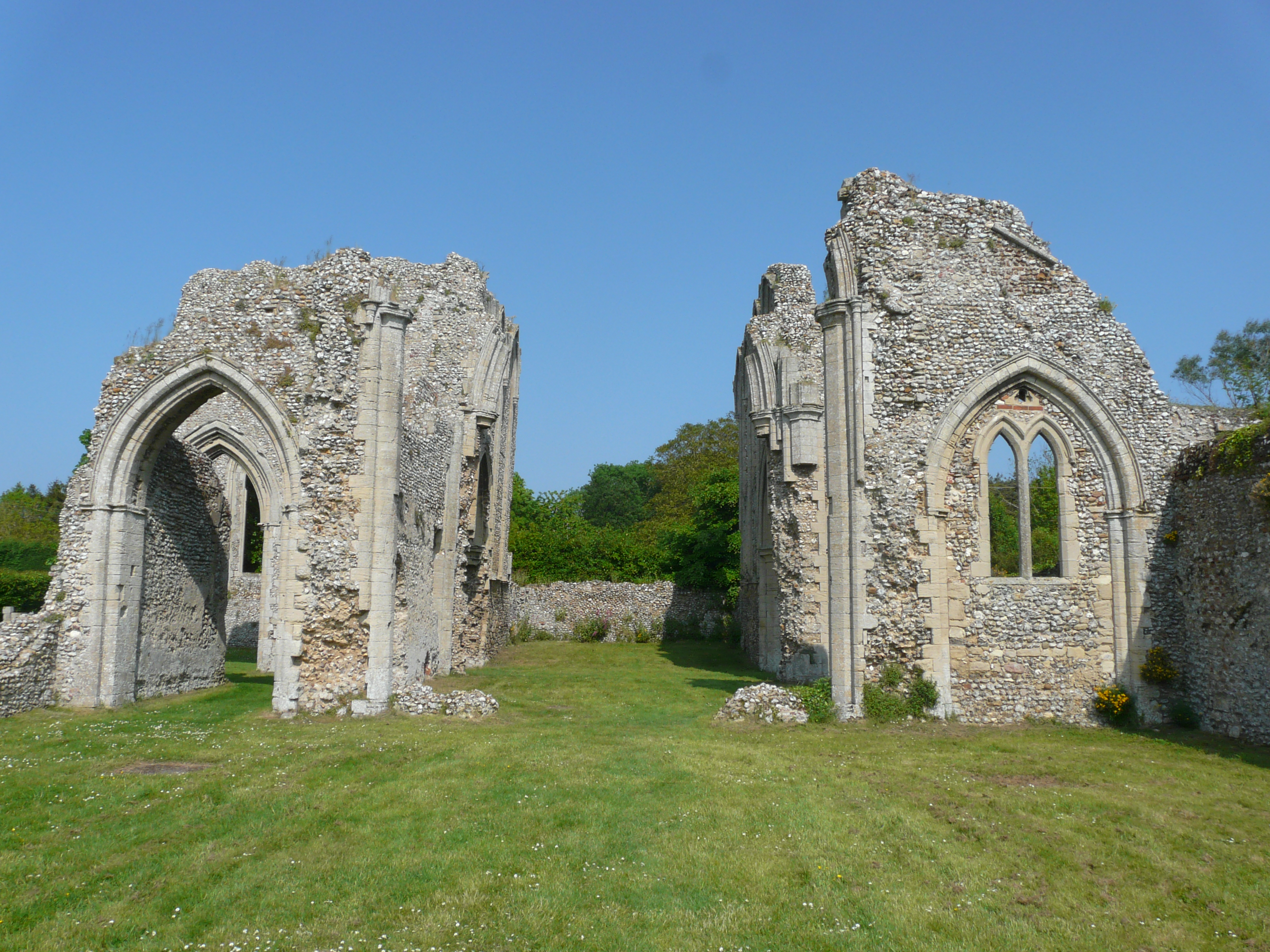
- Interactive map of Creake Abbey
- 52°55′12″N 0°45′33″E
- Type: Abbey
- Location: King's Lynn and West Norfolk, East of England, Norfolk, England

Site notes
- Owner: Managed by English Heritage
- Public access: Open all year round, at any reasonable time, Monday to Sunday North of North Creake, off B1355
- Website: https://www.english-heritage.org.uk/visit/places/creake-abbey

Creake Abbey is a ruined abbey in Norfolk, England, situated alongside the River Burn and a mile to the north of the village of North Creake. The abbey church was dedicated to Saint Mary. The ruins are Grade I listed, and form part of a Scheduled Monument site.

== History ==
The site was originally occupied by an almshouse for the poor, and was founded by the Augustinians as a priory in the 12th century. Voluntary grants of alms by the leading families of Nerford and Creake and by the faithful of the neighbourhood seem to have built up resources sufficiently to warrant elevation from Hospital to Priory and thence to Abbey, which happened in 1231. Henry III made a number of grants to Creake in its early years. Gifts of parish churches included Hapton and Wreningham, Gateley and St Martin at Quarles and later in 1365 of St Andrew, Great Ringstead.

The heyday of the Abbey was during the fourteenth century when there were but six canons, though the Rule required in addition to the abbot, prior and cellarer, a cantor, sacrist and kitchener, refectorian, infirmarian, almoner, master of novices and guest master. According to AL Bedingfield, these posts may have been filled in rotation or plurality. There will have been junior canons and, from time to time, novices. There would finally be numerous servants, tailors, laundresses and their assistants, the messor (harvest reaper), shepherds and cowherds for the farm, as well as residents of the hospital. Unlike some of the abbeys in the region, it was still fulfilling its hospital function as late as 1397.

In 1483, a fire swept through the abbey, damaging the church and several of the other buildings, such that it was beyond the capacity of the convent to restore it. The abbot appealed to the king as patron of the house, and Richard III, 'moved with pite' gave the abbey by way of alms towards the rebuilding of the handsome sum of £46 13s.4d., to be paid out the revenues of the lordship of Fakenham. Robert Walsingham, appointed abbot in 1491, began extensive rebuilding of the quire and presbytery, and Sir William Calthorpe left £74 towards the completion of the work. By 1503 the work was well advanced and lands given by Walter Aslake were used for the completion of the north side of the quire. By this time the abbot was Giles Sherington. However, in 1506 an outbreak of the 'sweating sickness' wiped out the monastic community, the abbot himself being the last to die. The abbey site and estate was given to Lady Margaret Beaufort in 1507, and ended up in the ownership of Christ's College, Cambridge.

== Ruins ==
A few sections of the church walls remain standing, and demonstrate their traditional Norfolk flintwork. There are some remaining carved details in the window arches and doorways. However, little else survives apart from foundations. The site is now in the care of English Heritage, and freely accessible to the public. The abbey ruins are Grade I listed, originally listed as St Mary's Abbey. Four bays of the 6-bay chancel survive to roof height. There were some restorations in 1864 by RM Phipson, Chief Architect of the Diocese of Norwich.

They form part of a wider heritage site, which is a Scheduled Monument. Within that wider site there are two further Grade I listings: the mixed mediaeval-19th-century farmhouse called Creake Abbey Farmhouse (but which was originally itself listed as Creake Abbey) and the garden walls between the abbey ruins and Creake Abbey Farmhouse.

There is a separate commercial enterprise, adjacent to the abbey ruins and Creake Abbey Farmhouse, which is called Creake Abbey. This is a café and farm shop, and hosts a farmers' market on the first Saturday of each month.
