= North Creake =

Village in Norfolk, England

Coordinates: 52.90837°N 0.75406°E

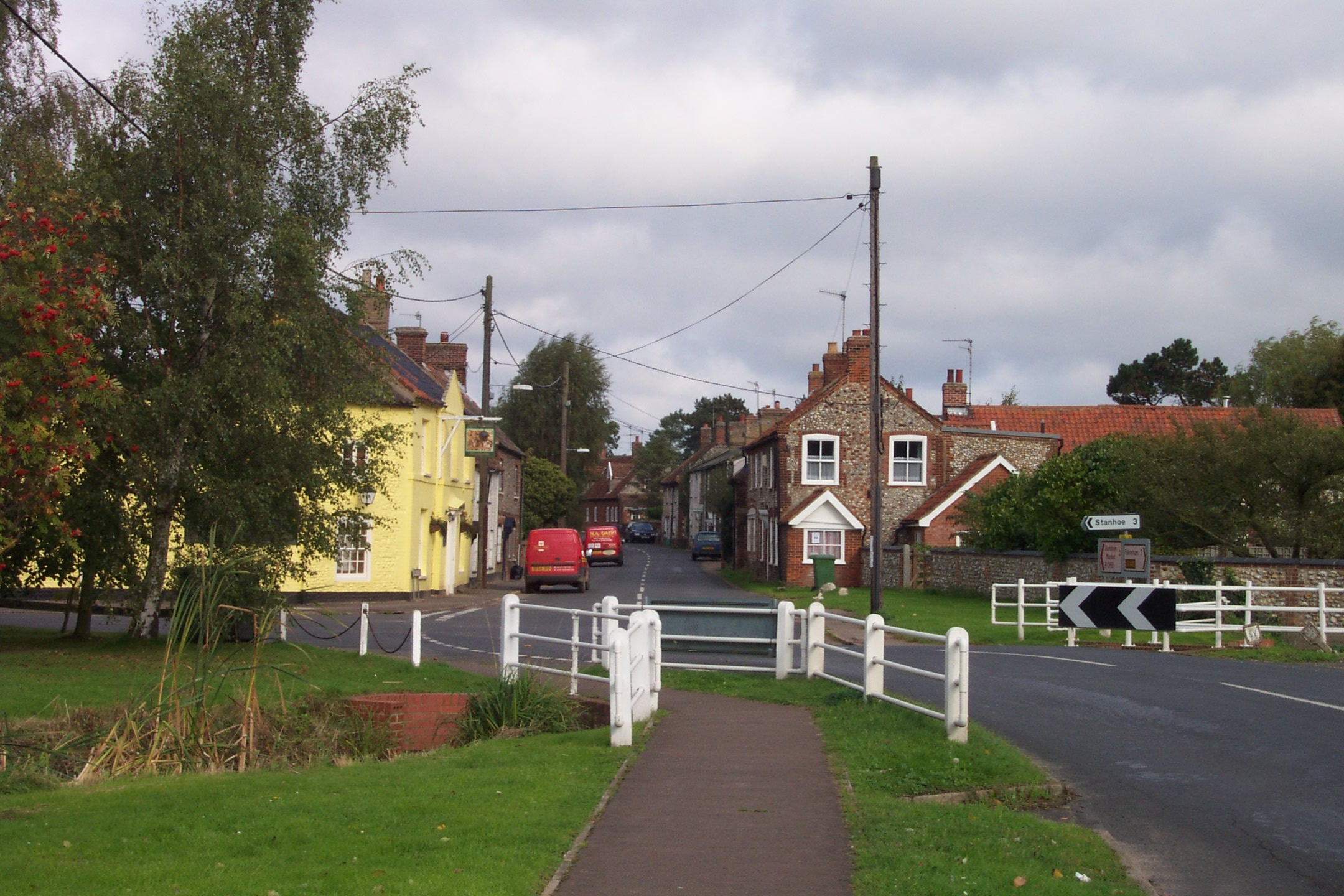
- North Creake village centre

- Location within Norfolk
- Area: 14.99 km^{2} (5.79 sq mi)
- Population: 386 (2011)
  - Density: 26/km^{2} (67/sq mi)
- OS grid reference: TF853381
- Civil parish: North Creake
- District: King's Lynn and West Norfolk
- Shire county: Norfolk
- Region: East
- Country: England
- Sovereign state: United Kingdom
- Post town: FAKENHAM
- Postcode district: NR21
- Police: Norfolk
- Fire: Norfolk
- Ambulance: East of England
- UK Parliament: North West Norfolk

North Creake is a village and civil parish in the north west of the English county of Norfolk. It covers an area of 14.99 km^{2} (5.79 sq mi) and had a population of 414 in 184 households at the 2001 census, reducing to 386 at the 2011 Census. For the purposes of local government, it falls within the district of King's Lynn and West Norfolk. The parish shares boundaries with the adjacent parishes of Burnham Market, Burnham Thorpe, Holkham, Walsingham, South Creake, Barwick and Stanhoe.

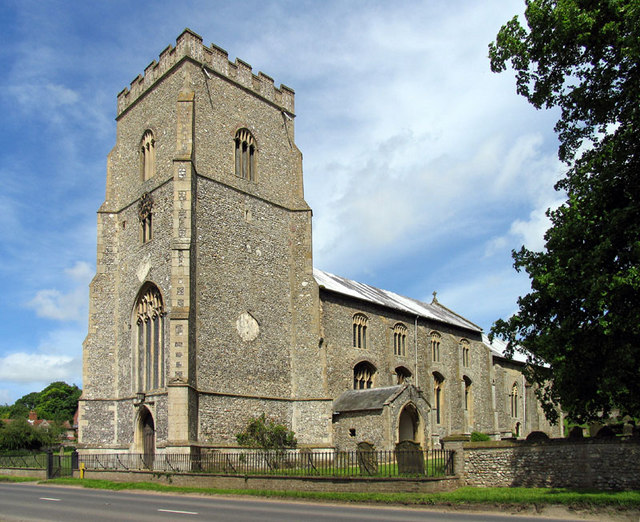
St Mary's Church

The village lies 3 miles (4.8 km) south of Burnham Market and about 5 miles (8.0 km) from the north Norfolk coast. 1 mile (1.6 km) further south is the village of South Creake.

The village lies on the River Burn, which flows through the centre of the village. 1 mile (1.6 km) to the north of the village along the river lies the ruined Creake Abbey. The village itself has a church, a public house and a post office. Most of the agricultural land surrounding the village, and many of the village houses, today belong to the estate of the Earl Spencer, although his family seat is many miles away in Althorp, Northamptonshire.

St Mary's, the Church of England parish church, is a Grade I listed building. The tower of a windmill survives.

On 27 April 1944, a de Havilland Mosquito fighter bomber on a night training exercise crashed in the centre of the village, killing the crew of two. On the 60th anniversary of the crash in 2004, a plaque on the approximate location of the crash was unveiled by a Royal Air Force guard of honour and other dignitaries, including relatives and friends of those killed.

The village was struck by an F1/T3 tornado on 23 November 1981, as part of the record-breaking nationwide tornado outbreak on that day.

The derivation of the name "Creake" is apparently from the Celtic word "creic" meaning a rock. South Creake is recorded in the Domesday Book of 1086 as "Suthcreich".

== See also ==
- RAF North Creake Second World War airfield
