= Newton by Castle Acre =

Village in Norfolk, England

Coordinates: 52.7058°N 0.70918°E

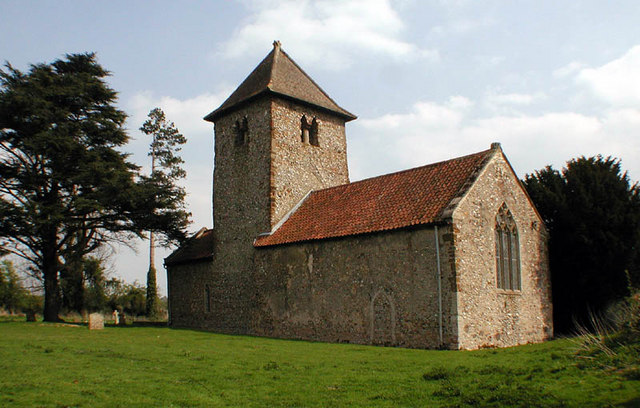
- All Saints parish church, Newton, Norfolk.

- Location within Norfolk
- Area: 4.37 km^{2} (1.69 sq mi)
- Population: 37 (2001 census)
  - Density: 8/km^{2} (21/sq mi)
- OS grid reference: TF831154
  - London: 104 miles (167 km)
- District: Breckland
- Shire county: Norfolk
- Region: East
- Country: England
- Sovereign state: United Kingdom
- Post town: KING'S LYNN
- Postcode district: PE32
- Dialling code: 01760
- Police: Norfolk
- Fire: Norfolk
- Ambulance: East of England

Newton by Castle Acre is a village, Anglican parish and civil parish in the Breckland district of the English county of Norfolk. It is situated on the A1065 Mildenhall to Fakenham road, about 4 miles (6.4 km) north of the town of Swaffham. The village is 28 miles (45 km) from the city of Norwich and 103 miles (166 km) from London.

== Geography ==
The civil parish has an area of 437 hectares (1,080 acres) and in the 2001 census had a population of 37 in 14 households. The parish shares boundaries with the adjacent parishes of Castle Acre, South Acre, Sporle with Palgrave, Little Dunham, Great Dunham and Lexham. The parish falls within the district of Breckland. Local government responsibilities are shared between the parish, district and county councils.

== History ==
Newton was a significant settlement in the Hundred of South Greenhoe at the time of the Domesday Survey of 1086, with 39 households under the ownership of King William and Ivo Tallboys. William's holding comprised two villagers, six freemen, 11 smallholders and four slaves, and resources included two mills, a shared salthouse and cattle, pigs and sheep, with a total value of eight pounds. Ivo Tallboys holding included eight villagers, two freemen, five smallholders and 1 slave, and with horses, cattle and sheep had a total value of four pounds.

== Ecclesiastical parish ==
The parish church of St Mary and All Saints is an ancient structure and a Grade I listed building. The church is believed to have been built around the time of Edward the Confessor. The parish is in the Diocese of Norwich.

== Watermill ==
A watermill and house on the River Nar was built in 1797 using materials from the nearby ruined Castle Acre Priory. Dick Joice, Norfolk historian and TV presenter, bought the site in 1967 and rebuilt the millhouse.
