= East Walton =

Village in Norfolk, England

Coordinates: 52.71125°N 0.58133°E

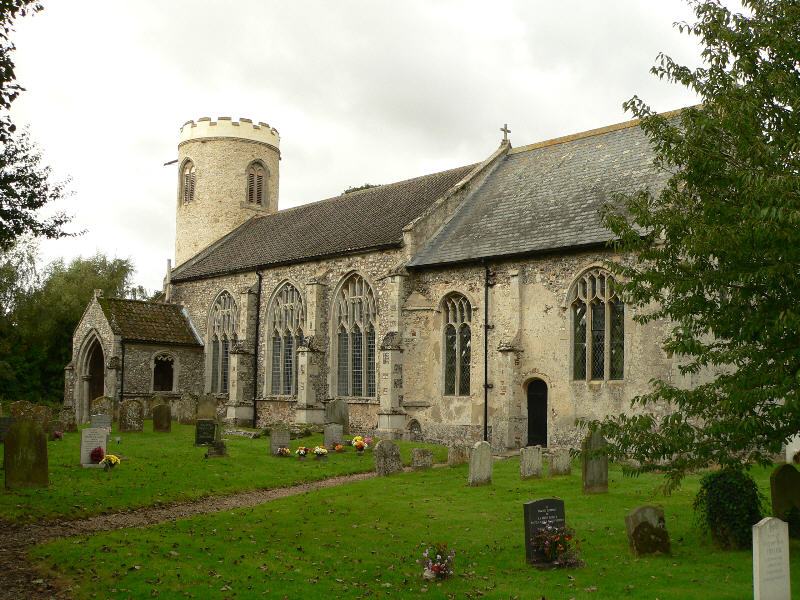
- St. Mary's Church, East Walton

- Location within Norfolk
- Area: 4.17 sq mi (10.8 km^{2})
- OS grid reference: TF744157
  - London: 88 miles (142 km)
- Civil parish: East Walton
- District: King's Lynn and West Norfolk
- Shire county: Norfolk
- Region: East
- Country: England
- Sovereign state: United Kingdom
- Post town: KING'S LYNN
- Postcode district: PE32
- Dialling code: 01760
- Police: Norfolk
- Fire: Norfolk
- Ambulance: East of England
- UK Parliament: South West Norfolk

East Walton is a village and civil parish in the English county of Norfolk.

East Walton is located 7.8 miles (12.6 km) south-east of King's Lynn and 31 miles (50 km) north-west of Norwich.

== History ==
East Walton's name is of Anglo-Saxon origin and derives from the Old English for the eastern wall farm settlement.

East Walton has seen numerous archaeological digs which have discovered the site of a possible Bronze Age burial barrow and three separate Roman settlements.

In the Domesday Book, East Walton is listed as a settlement of 37 households in the hundred of Freebridge. In 1086, the village was divided between the East Anglian estates of Alan of Brittany, Roger Bigod and Ralph de Tosny.

The ruins of St. Andrew's Chapel still stand in the village which was likely abandoned in the Sixteenth Century.

East Walton was the site of significant Second World War defences in preparation for a German invasion, defences including a pillbox and searchlight were installed in the east of the village with a further tank trap built on the bridge over the River Nar. In August 1942, a Dornier 217 shot down by a Bristol Beaufighter flown by Ft-Off. Hugh Wyrill crashed in nearby Walton Wood.

== Geography ==
According to the 2001 Census, East Walton has a population of 94 residents living in 40 households with the parish having a total area of 10.81 km^{2} (4.17 sq mi).

The B1153, between Narborough and Brancaster, runs through the parish as does the River Nar.

== St. Mary's Church ==
East Walton's church is dedicated to Saint Mary and is one of Norfolk's 124 remaining Anglo-Saxon round tower churches. St. Mary's is located on Church Lane within the village and has been Grade I listed since 1960.

St. Mary's Churchtower pre-dates the Norman Conquest, the rest of the church building dates from the Fourteenth Century, with the interior being significantly remodelled in the early-Eighteenth Century.

== Governance ==
East Walton is part of the electoral ward of Gayton & Grimston for local elections and is part of the district of King's Lynn and West Norfolk

The village's national constituency is South West Norfolk which has been represented by Labour's Terry Jermy MP since 2024.

== War Memorial ==
East Walton's war memorial is a brass plaque inside St. Mary's Church. The memorial lists the following names for the First World War:

Rank	Name	Unit	Date of death	Burial
LCpl.	William T. Cropley	10th Bn., Essex Regiment	15 Jun. 1917	Arras Memorial
Pte.	Abraham Skeet	3rd Bn., Norfolk Regiment	21 Jul. 1916	St. Mary's Churchyard
