= Andrew Fountaine (disambiguation) =

Andrew Fountaine (1918–1997) was a veteran of the far right scene in British politics.

Andrew Fountaine may also refer to:

- Andrew Fountaine (MP) (1637–1707), member of parliament for Newton
- Andrew Fountaine (art collector) (1676–1753), English antiquarian, art collector and amateur architect
