= Narford =

Village in Norfolk, England

Coordinates: 52.693196°N 0.611269°E

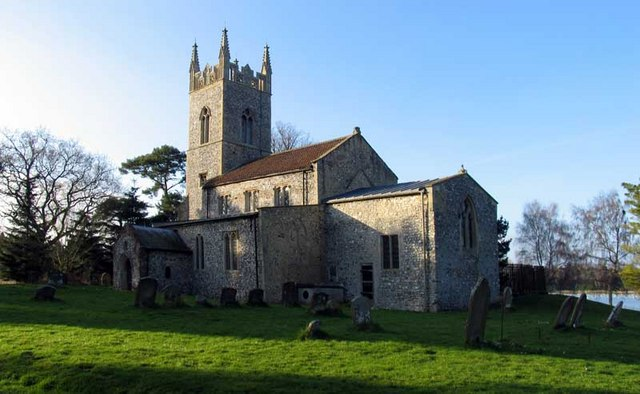
- St Mary the Virgin, Narford

- Location within Norfolk
- Area: 9.70 km^{2} (3.75 sq mi)
- Population: 41 UK census 2001
  - Density: 4/km^{2} (10/sq mi)
- OS grid reference: TF764138
- District: Breckland
- Shire county: Norfolk
- Region: East
- Country: England
- Sovereign state: United Kingdom
- Post town: KING'S LYNN
- Postcode district: PE32
- Dialling code: 01760
- Police: Norfolk
- Fire: Norfolk
- Ambulance: East of England
- UK Parliament: South West Norfolk

Narford is situated in the Breckland District of Norfolk and covers an area of 970 hectares (3.75 square miles). Narford village has all but disappeared, with a population of only 41. At the 2011 Census the population of the area remained less than 100 and is included in the civil parish of South Acre.

The villages name probably means 'narrow ford' or 'ford at the narrow place'.

The large 18th-century Narford Hall built by Andrew Fountaine, art collector and amateur architect, is nearby. Giovanni Antonio Pellegrini's decorations were removed from Burlington House in London by 1727 and survive at Narford Hall. Andrew Fountaine (1918–1997) who was a founder member of the National Labour Party and deputy leader of the British National Front lived at the hall.

To the rear of the hall runs the river River Nar on its way from West Acre towards Narborough. Adjacent to the hall is St Mary the Virgin church in the Benefice of Narborough and part of the Nar Valley Group of Parishes. Both the church and the hall are Grade I listed.

The village is on the Nar Valley Way path.

In 1870-72, John Marius Wilson's Imperial Gazetteer of England and Wales described Narford.

== Gallery ==
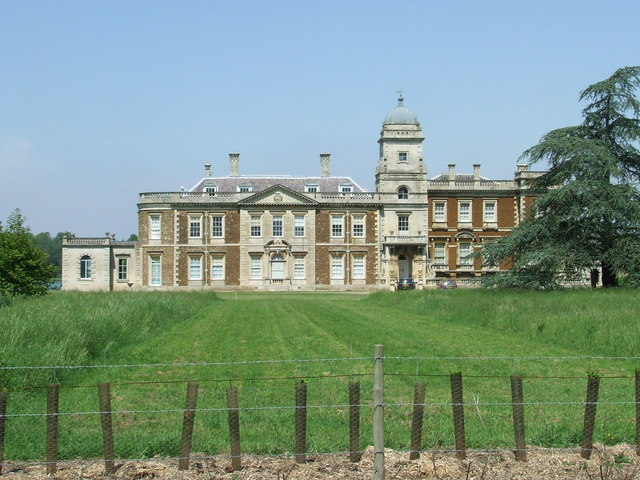
Narford Hall

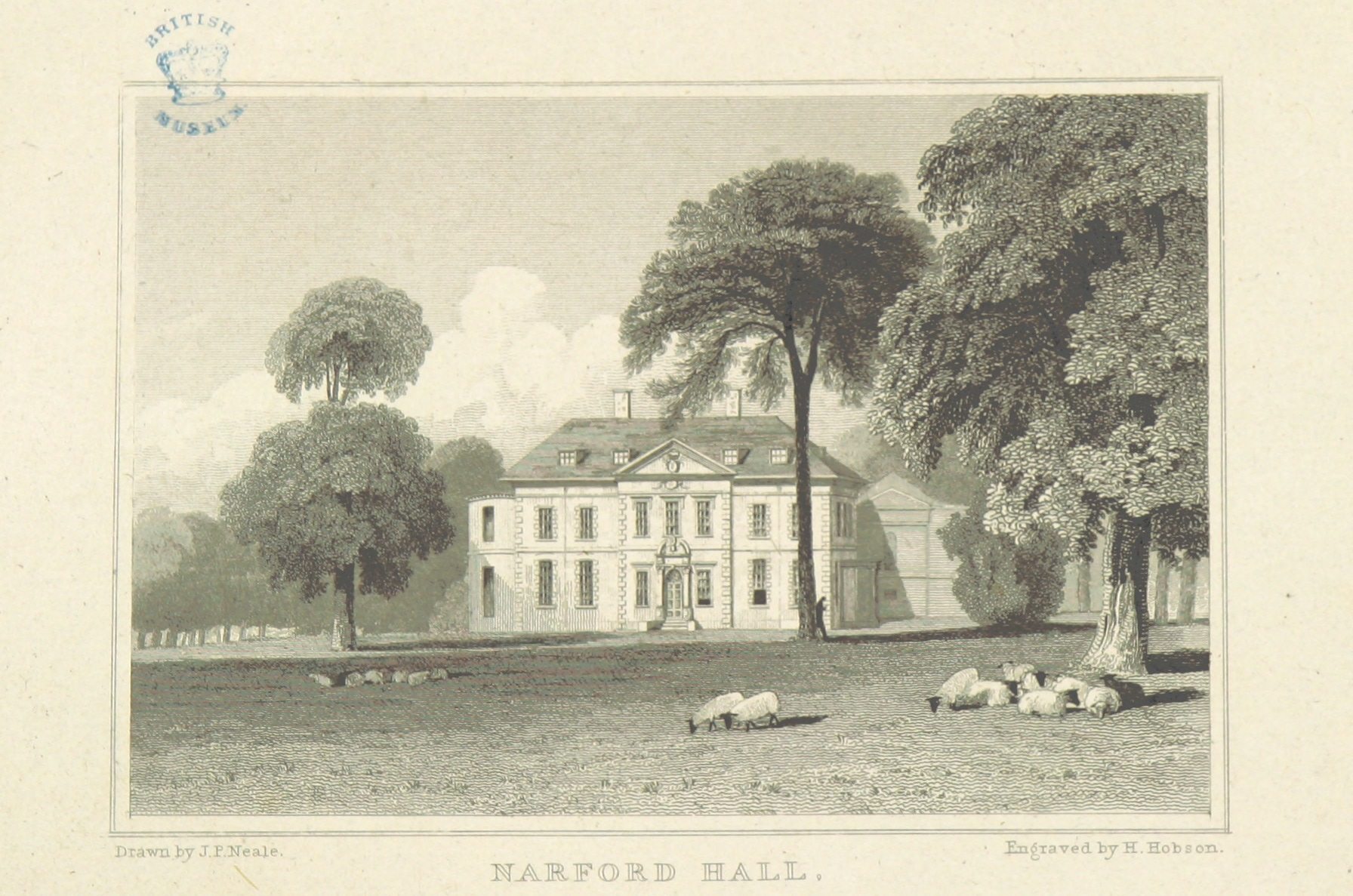
Narford Hall (1818)
