= Narborough Watermill =

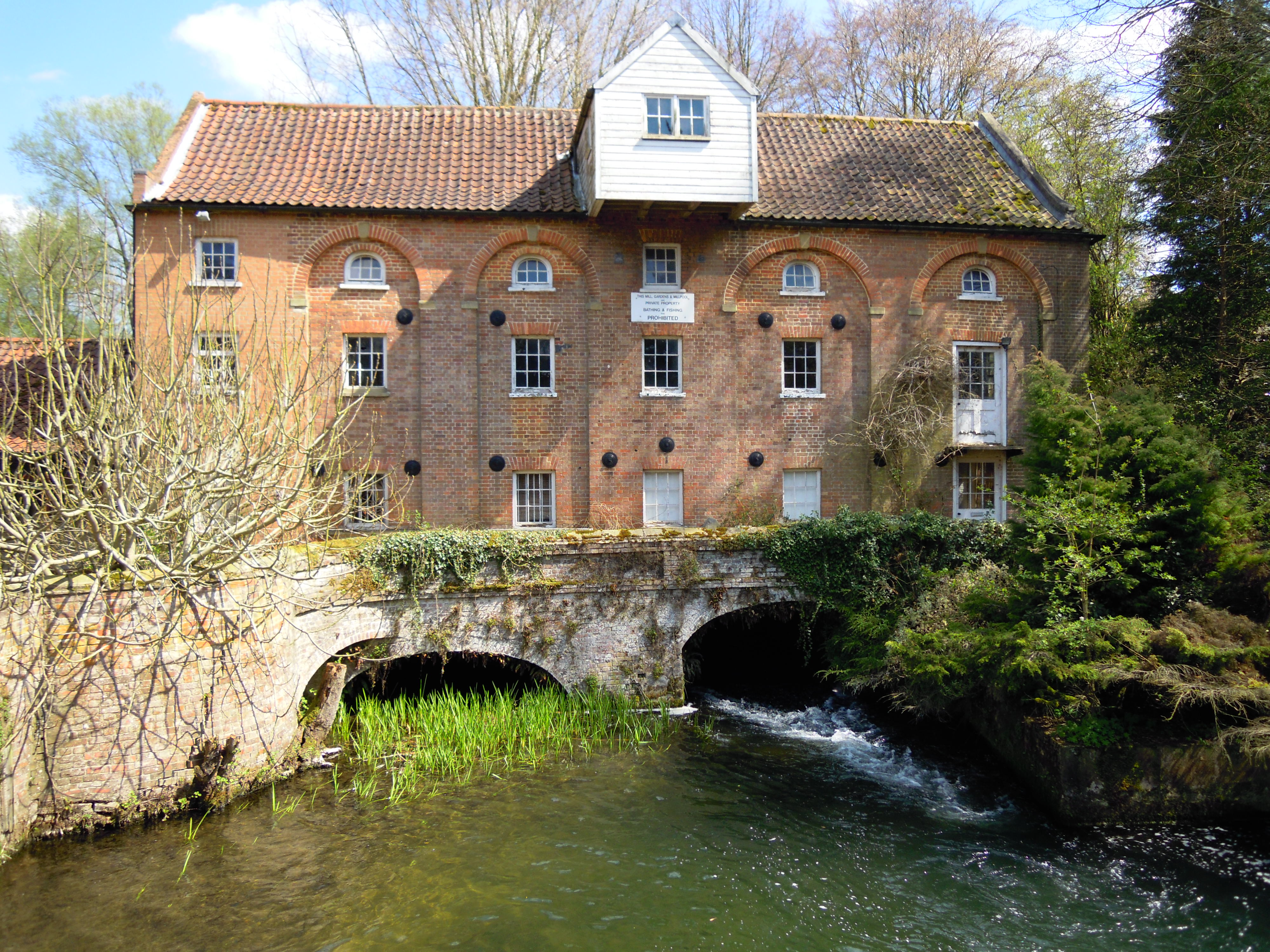
- Narborough Watermill west elevation.

- Location within Norfolk

General information
- Type: Watermill
- Location: River Nar, Narborough, England
- Coordinates: 52°41′15.56″N 0°35′0.96″E
- Opened: cica 1780
- Owner: Private

Technical details
- Material: Norfolk red Brick built with red Pantile roof

Narborough Watermill is located on the river Nar, within the village of Narborough in the English county of Norfolk. The watermill is thought to have been built around 1780 and is a Grade II listed building

== Description ==
The Watermill is built from red Norfolk brick over three storeys in six bays to the west elevation. Four of the six bays are recessed within giant enclosing arches. The arches are semicircular headed with raised ashlars and a Keystone. In the center of the west elevation of the mill there is a timber lucam (covered sack hoist) of shiplap construction. In front of the west elevation there is a bridge with a three centered arch through which the mill race flows. The bridge has a parapet wall. The rear east elevation is constructed with weatherboard cladding with a continuous first floor outshoot which houses machinery of the mill. Below this there are sluice gates beneath a three centered archway. The ground and first floor of the mill still contains the Mill wheel and the machinery all which are now listed. The surviving machinery includes a 13 feet 7 inches (4.14 m) wheel driving pit-wheel and wallower. There is a horizontal mainshaft that once drove 6 pairs of stones, although there are only five that now survive. The mill race still flows through under the building.

== History ==
Narborough watermill is thought to have been built around 1780 and over the years has been extended, altered and had parts demolished over the long period of its existence. In 1845 the watermill had an extension built on to the North West corner of the mill by the miller Charles Tyssen. However this addition proved to be un-successful as the building had been erected on poor foundations and it began to slowly sink over a period of years. The section, including a miller’s house which stood to the front, had to be demolished in 1980 for safety reasons. At the same time piling work was done to underpin the remaining building.

== See also ==
- River Nar
- Narborough Bone Mill
