= Edmund Daubeny =

English cricketer

Personal information
- Full name: Edmund Thomas Daubeny
- Born: 14 July 1840; Paddington, Middlesex, England
- Died: 20 August 1914 (aged 74); South Acre, Norfolk, England
- Height: 6 ft 1 in (1.85 m)
- Batting: Unknown
- Bowling: Unknown

Domestic team information
- Years: Team
- 1860–1863: Oxford University

Career statistics
Competition	First-class
Matches	7
Runs scored	33
Batting average	4.12
100s/50s	–/–
Top score	11
Balls bowled	730
Wickets	26
Bowling average	15.05
5 wickets in innings	1
10 wickets in match	–
Best bowling	5/35
Catches/stumpings	5/–
- Source: Cricinfo, 25 February 2020

Edmund Thomas Daubeny (14 July 1840 – 20 August 1914) was an English first-class cricketer and clergyman.

The son of Edmund Joseph Daubeny, he was born at Paddington in July 1840. He was educated at Bromsgrove School, before going up to Magdalen College, Oxford. While studying at Oxford, he made seven appearances in first-class cricket for Oxford University between 1860 and 1863. Playing as a bowler, he took 26 wickets at an average of 15.05, with best figures of 5 for 35. These figures, which was his only five wicket haul, came against Southgate in 1863. After graduating from Oxford, Daubeny took holy orders in the Church of England. He was the rector of Market Weston in Norfolk in 1884. Daubeny died at South Acre in August 1914.
