= Castle Acre Castle and town walls =

Grade I listed castle in United Kingdom

Castle Acre
- Castle Acre, Norfolk, England
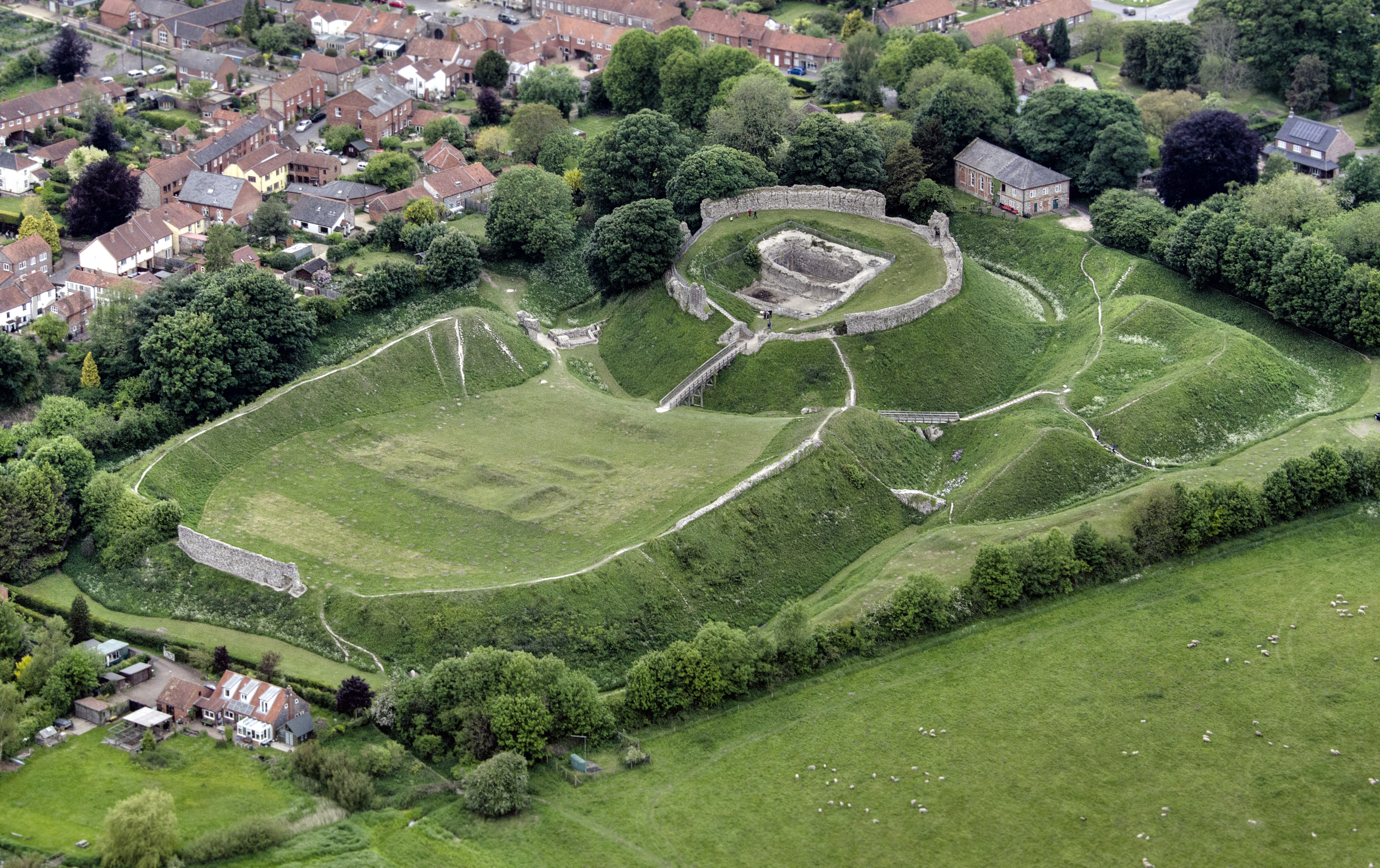
- Aerial view of the castle, showing the outer bailey (left), inner bailey and barbican (right)

Site information
- Type: Motte-and-bailey castle
- Owner: English Heritage
- Open to the public: Yes
- Condition: Ruins

Location
- Location within Norfolk
- Coordinates: 52.7030°N 0.6932°E

Site history
- Built: 1070s, c. 1140–1165
- Built by: De Warenne family

Castle Acre Castle and town walls are a set of ruined medieval defences built in the village of Castle Acre, Norfolk. The castle was built soon after the Norman Conquest by William de Warenne, the Earl of Surrey, at the intersection of the River Nar and the Peddars Way. William constructed a motte-and-bailey castle during the 1070s, protected by large earthwork ramparts, with a large country house in the centre of the motte. Soon after, a small community of Cluniac monks were given the castle's chapel in the outer bailey; under William, the second earl, the order was given land and estates to establish Castle Acre Priory alongside the castle. A deer park was created nearby for hunting.

After civil war broke out in England in 1135, the third earl, also called William, set about improving the defences of the castle. He began to build a tall keep on top of the motte, reinforcing the surrounding earthworks with stone walls. A planned settlement was established alongside the castle, surrounded by its own earthworks and walls, and the Peddars Way was redirected to pass by the castle, town and priory, all important symbols of the de Warennes' power in the region. Hamelin de Warenne acquired the castle through marriage and curtailed the building work on the keep around 1165, but completed the construction of three large stone gatehouses in the castle and town. One of these, the town's bailey gate, still survives intact.

The de Warennes continued to hold the castle until 1347, when it was inherited by Richard Fitzalan, the Earl of Arundel. By 1397 the fortifications were in ruins and, despite restoration work by Sir Edward Coke at the start of the 17th century, the decline continued until the 20th century. In 1971, Thomas Coke, the Earl of Leicester, placed the castle into the guardianship of the state. In the 21st century, it is managed by English Heritage and open to visitors. Historic England consider the castle's huge defensive earthworks to be "among the finest surviving in England".

== History ==
=== 11th century ===
Castle Acre Castle was built by William de Warenne, the Earl of Surrey, in the manor of Acre during the 1070s. William was a Norman lord who had accompanied William the Conqueror in the conquest of England in 1066; he was rewarded with extensive estates across England. Acre was already an Anglo-Saxon estate centre and at the time of the invasion was owned by a wealthy man called Toki, but he was quickly replaced by Frederick, a Flemish lord and William's brother-in-law. When Frederick died around 1070, William acquired control of the manor, which formed part of his massive land holdings across the region.

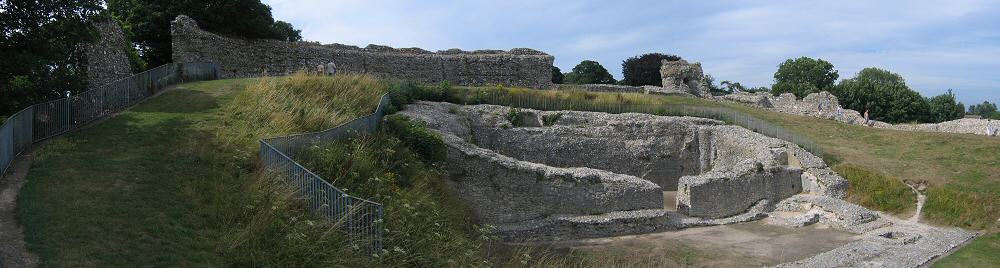
Remains of the keep, inner bailey and surrounding wall

The castle was strategically located where the River Nar met the Peddars Way, an old Roman road, at the centre of Warenne's other estates in Norfolk, and may have been built on top of Toki's former house. (Note: The River Nar was a major waterway in the medieval period, linking to the Little Ouse; it is now much silted and is effectively only a stream.) The castle had a motte-and-bailey design: its large outer and inner baileys were protected by earthworks and palisades, and a stone gatehouse was added to the inner bailey shortly afterwards. In the centre of the inner bailey was a grand double-hall built from stone, but this was not fortified and would have been more like a country house than a conventional Norman keep. (Note: The historian M. W. Thompson disagrees with the interpretation of the early hall as a country house, arguing that it was an attempt to produce a "proto-keep", with it possessing clear defensive properties while still trying to incorporate a hall.)

William gave St Mary's, the former parish church which was now surrounded by the castle's outer bailey, to the Cluniac order of monks, along with 110 hectares (270 acres) of farmland. By 1088 a handful of monks had arrived from Lewes, where William had also founded a Cluniac community, to settle at the castle. William's son, the second Earl William de Warrene, gave the monks a more spacious area of land to the west of the castle, probably in 1090, where they built Castle Acre Priory; the construction took a long time, and the priory was not fully completed until the 1160s. Monastic sites like the priory would have given their founders, and their associated castles, considerable prestige. A deer park was constructed near Castle Acre, with farmed rabbit warrens established around its edges.

=== 12th century ===
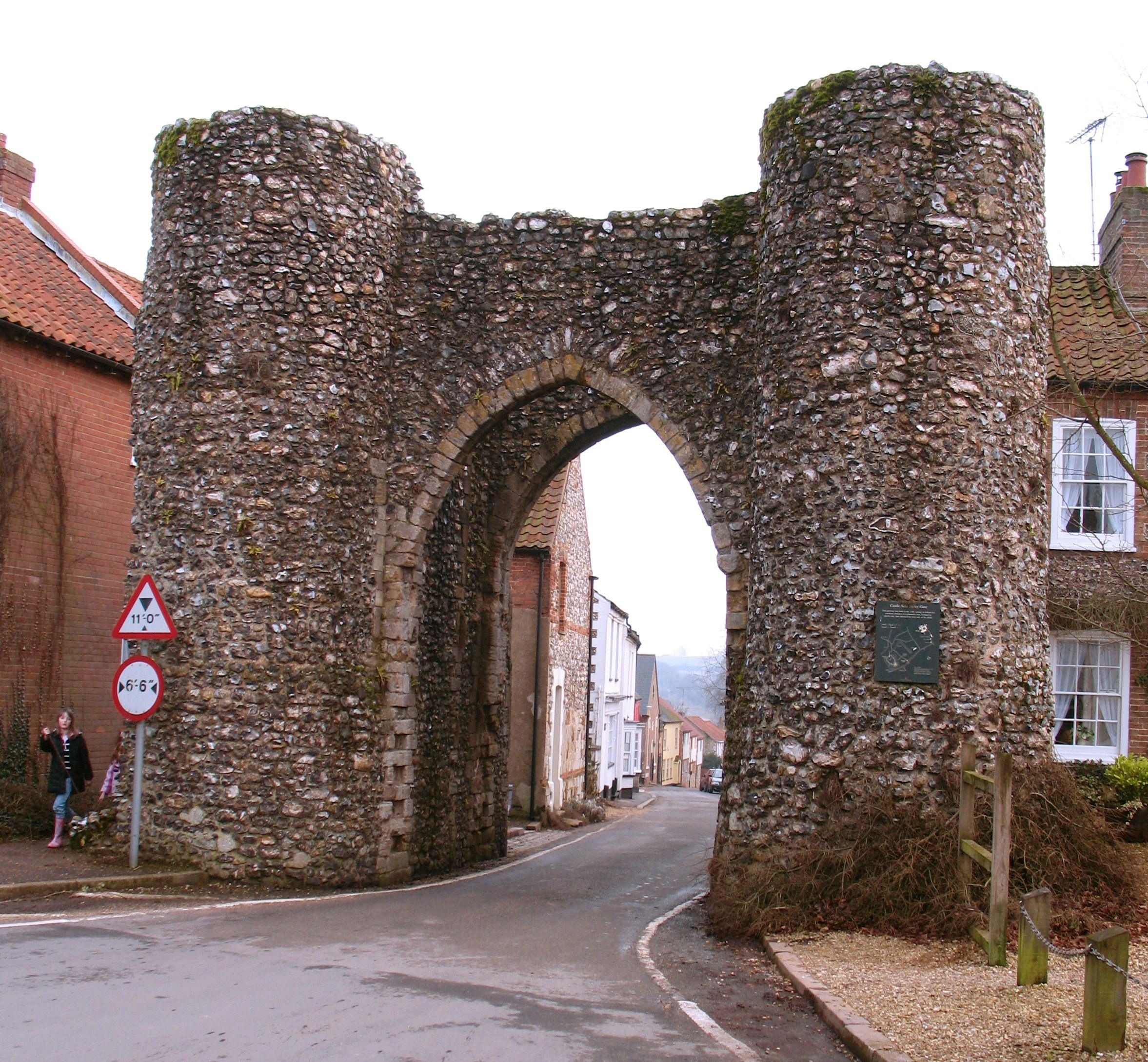
Exterior view of the town's bailey gate

Robert Curthose, the Duke of Normandy, invaded England in 1101 with the backing of many of the barons, but was persuaded to halt his campaign and return to Normandy after King Henry I bought him off with a substantial annuity. William de Warrenne had backed the duke during his campaign, however, and now found himself politically exposed. He was exiled and disseised of his English estates, including Castle Acre, until in 1103 the duke was able to persuade Henry to permit William to return and reclaim his lands.

After 1135, a civil war known as the Anarchy broke out between the supporters of King Stephen and the Empress Matilda. William supported Stephen, as did his son, the third Earl William de Warenne, when he inherited the earldom in 1138. There was fighting across much of the country, although less so in Norfolk, but William also faced challenges to his preeminence in the region from the growing power of the d'Albinis and de Vere families. In response, William remodelled Castle Acre Castle. Around 1140, the earthworks were raised considerably and the double-hall was first strengthened, and then began to be converted into a very tall, square keep. The timber ramparts of the inner bailey were replaced with a stone wall, and the height of the earthworks around the outer bailey were raised and topped with a stone wall.

A fortified, planned settlement was built alongside the castle around this time. The small community was not quite a proper town and was effectively dependent on the castle; such settlements are sometimes called burgus settlements or "castle-gate" towns. The historians Oliver Creighton and Robert Higham suggest the settlement's earthwork defences and stone walls resemble an "enormous outer bailey" of the castle, rather a more conventional set of town walls. The walled settlement would have formed an important symbol of William's lordship.

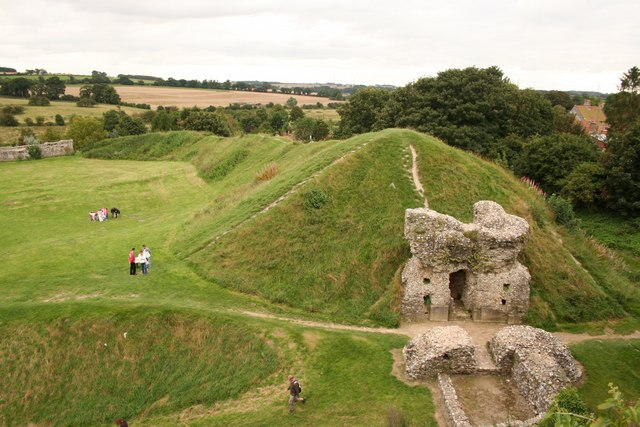
Remains of the west gatehouse in the outer bailey

As part of these works, the Peddars Way was redirected. It had previously run straight across the de Warenne estates, but it was now diverted so that travellers coming from the south had to leave the main road, progress west around the priory and the castle fishpond, before reaching the southern end of the walled town and the route to the north. If they intended to enter the castle, they would have needed to enter through the town's western gate, then the castle's gatehouse, before probably passing through a ceremonial sequence of rooms in order to finally meet the lord. The route was designed to highlight the important symbols of the de Warenne lordship of the region and provide a dramatic view of the castle, and may have been a response to the political uncertainties of the Anarchy years.

William died in 1148 while taking part in the Second Crusade, leaving the castle and lands to his daughter, Isabel de Warenne, who was then married to King Stephen's son, William of Blois. In 1153, however, Stephen faced a military stalemate in the civil war and agreed that Matilda's son, the future Henry II, should inherit the throne on his death, rather than William of Blois. Henry assumed power the next year and took control of various castles across England, including Castle Acre. Henry then married Isabel to his illegitimate brother, Hamelin de Warenne, in 1164, who acquired the castle along with the other de Warrenne lands. Hamelin changed the plan for the castle: the original ambition for the height of the keep was reduced and the southern half of the building was demolished. It is unclear if even this less ambitious building was ever completed. Hamelin also probably built the two gatehouses in the town, and the western gatehouse in the castle's outer bailey.

=== 13th–14th centuries ===
The castle and settlement continued to be mostly held by the de Warennes until 1347. The castle was frequented by royalty, Henry III visiting the castle at least four times, and Edward I visiting five times. The seventh earl, John de Warenne, married Joan, the niece of Edward II, but the marriage failed and instead he chose to live with his mistress Maud Nereford. This situation led to threats of excommunication. In 1316, John therefore gave Castle Acre to Aymer de Valence, the Earl of Pembroke and England's Ambassador to Rome, probably to encourage him to present a petition to the Pope to annul the marriage the following year. John later reacquired the castle, but he died in 1347 with no legitimate heirs.

Richard Fitzalan, the Earl of Arundel, inherited the estate but by 1397 the castle was in ruins. The surrounding settlement remained small and never became a borough, although the priory prospered.

=== 15th–21st centuries ===
Cross-section of the castle motte, by Thomas Kerrich in 1782, showing the pilaster buttresses and battlements of the bailey walls, and the west gatehouse of the castle. The walls are now much lower and only the foundations of the gatehouse remains.

After 1537, Thomas Howard, the Duke of Norfolk, leased the ruins of the castle and the adjacent priory, which had been closed during the Dissolution of the Monasteries. His grandson, Thomas Howard, sold the properties to the financier Sir Thomas Gresham in 1558, and in turn they were purchased by first Thomas Cecil, the Earl of Exeter, and then in 1615 to Sir Edward Coke, a prominent lawyer. Edward, who was interested in history and possibly keen to reinforce his own credentials as a new entrant to the English elite, carried out repairs to the castle at a cost of £60. (Note: Comparing 17th-century and modern financial sums is challenging, and depends on the comparison measure used. £60 in 1615 could equate to between a sum of £10,950 in 2016, using a GDP deflator, or as much as £3,306,000, using a share of GDP measure.)

The castle was passed down within Coke's family, who became the earls of Leicester. Over the years the walls were robbed of their stone and the site used for grazing animals; the antiquarian Henry Harrod noted in 1857 that "every house in the neighbourhood has some of the stone-work of the castle...in its walls". With the closure of the priory and the abandonment of the castle, the prosperity of the settlement of Castle Acre also declined. Antiquarian interest in the sites grew from the 18th century onward, and archaeological investigations took place in the 1850s and 1930s, but visitors were mostly more interested in the ruins of the priory than those of the castle.

In 1971, Thomas Coke, the fifth Earl of Leicester, placed the castle into the guardianship of the state. Major archaeological excavations were carried out between 1972 and 1983, focusing on the inner bailey. In the 21st century, the castle and the bailey gate are managed by English Heritage and open to visitors. The castle and the settlement defences are protected under UK law as a scheduled monument, and the bailey gate is further protected as a Grade I listed building.

== Architecture ==
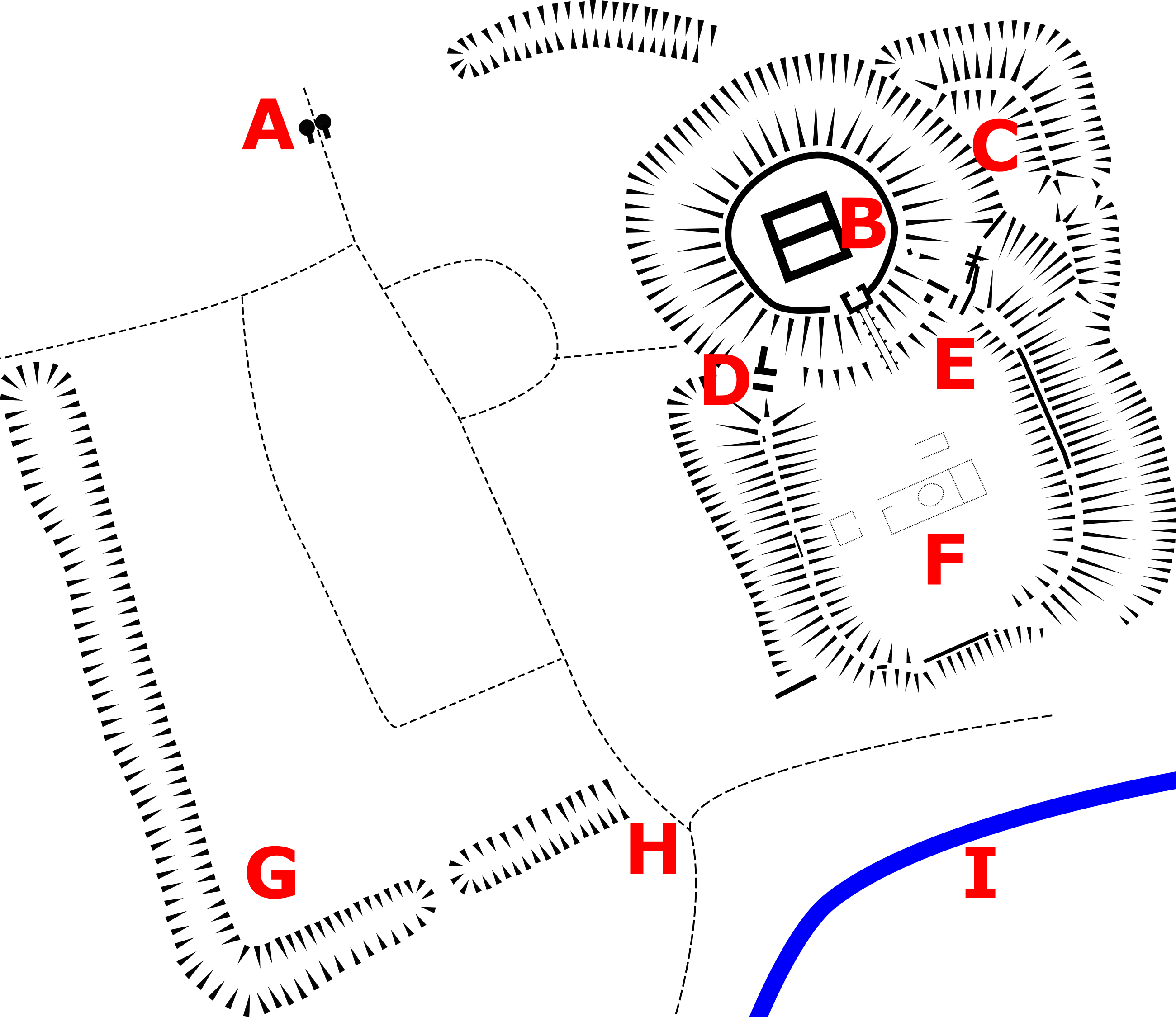
Plan of the castle and town defences: A – bailey gate; B – inner bailey and site of keep; C – barbican; D – castle west gate to town; E – castle east gate to barbican; F – outer bailey and site of former buildings; G – town earthwork ramparts; H – site of town's south gate; I – River Nar

Castle Acre Castle comprises three main earthworks: a motte and inner bailey to the north, an outer bailey to the south, and a barbican to the north-east. The medieval settlement of Castle Acre was linked to the western edge of the castle, and enclosed by its own circuit of earthwork defences and walls. Historic England consider the castle's huge defensive earthworks to be "among the finest surviving in England"

The castle's large outer bailey is rectangular in shape, covering 8,000 square metres (86,000 sq ft), surrounded by earth banks and, on the east and west, deep ditches. Fragments of its 12th-century stone walls survive in places. The main entrance to the castle came from the town through the north-west corner of the outer bailey; this was defended by a stone gatehouse and a portcullis, of which only the foundations now survive. Two other gates from the bailey led north-east into the barbican, and south down to the River Nar. The outer bailey would have contained a hall, kitchen, accommodation and a chapel, although only traces of these can now be seen on the surface. The route into the earthwork barbican was guarded by a gateway and a bridge. The barbican was designed to protect the castle's exposed north-eastern flank and had its own entrance from the eastern side.

The inner bailey is reached by a bridge, which was originally made from wood, later rebuilt in stone, before replaced by the current steel version in the 20th century. The inner bailey comprises a roughly circular earthwork, up to 9.5 metres (31 ft) high, topped by the remains of a stone curtain wall and protected by ditches, now about 3 metres (9.8 ft) deep. The earthworks form a raised motte, although they combine features of a circular ringwork. The ruins of the 12th-century keep and the foundations of the 11th-century house, constructed from chalk rubble, remain visible and are surrounded by much of the rampart wall, made from chalk rubble and flint.

The planned settlement of Castle Acre was 225 by 188 metres (738 by 617 ft) in size, covering 4.25 hectares (10.5 acres). There are well-preserved ramparts along the west and south side, known as Dyke Hills, the surviving ditch being around 17 metres (56 ft) wide and 3 metres (9.8 ft) deep, and the bank 3 metres (9.8 ft) high. The bailey gatehouse was built from flint stone and defended with two drum towers and a portcullis. It survives largely intact, although is roofless. Parts of the settlement's stone wall survive alongside the bailey gatehouse, and along the southern ramparts.

== See also ==
- Castles in Great Britain and Ireland
- List of castles in England

== Bibliography ==
- Boyer, Allen D. (2003). Sir Edward Coke and the Elizabethan Age. Stanford, U.S.: Stanford University Press. ISBN 0-8047-4809-8.
- Brown, R. Allen (1989). Castles From the Air. Cambridge, UK: Cambridge University Press. ISBN 978-0-521-32932-3.
- Creighton, Oliver H. (2005) [2002]. Castles and Landscapes: Power, Community and Fortification in Medieval England. London, UK: Equinox. ISBN 978-1-904768-67-8.
- Creighton, Oliver H. (2013) [2009]. Designs Upon the Land: Elite Landscapes of the Middle Ages. Cambridge, UK: Woodbridge Press. ISBN 978-1-84383-825-8.
- Creighton, Oliver; Higham, Robert (2005). Medieval Town Walls: an Archaeology and Social History of Urban Defence. Stroud, UK: Tempus. ISBN 978-0-7524-1445-4.
- Drage, C. (1987). "Urban Castles". In Schofield, John; Leech, Roger (eds.). Urban Archaeology in Britain. London, UK: Council for British Archaeology. pp. 117–132. ISBN 0-906780-59-4.
- Emery, Anthony (2000). Greater Medieval Houses of England and Wales, 1300–1500, Volume 2: East Anglia, Central England and Wales. Cambridge, UK: Cambridge University Press. ISBN 978-0-521-58131-8.
- Harrod, Henry (1857). Gleanings among the Castle and Convents of Norfolk. Norwich, UK: n.p. OCLC 04253893.
- Impey, Edward (2008). Castle Acre Priory and Castle. London, UK: English Heritage. ISBN 978-1-84802-012-2.
- King, D. J. Cathcart (1991). The Castle in England and Wales: An Interpretative History. London, UK: Routledge. ISBN 978-0-415-00350-6.
- Liddiard, Robert (2005). Castles in Context: Power, Symbolism and Landscape, 1066 to 1500. Macclesfield, UK: Windgather Press. ISBN 0-9545575-2-2.
- Phillips, J. R. S. (1972). Aymer de Valence, Earl of Pembroke 1307–1324: Baronial Politics in the Reign of Edward II. Oxford, UK: Oxford University Press. ISBN 978-0-19-822359-7.
- Pounds, Norman John Greville (1990). The Medieval Castle in England and Wales: A Social and Political History. Cambridge, UK: Cambridge University Press. ISBN 978-0-521-45828-3.
- Thompson, M. W. (1991). The Rise of the Castle. Cambridge, UK: Cambridge University Press. ISBN 978-0-521-08853-4.
