= Dick Joice =

British television presenter (1921–1999)

Richard George Joice (1921 in Great Ryburgh, Norfolk – 1 October 1999) was a British regional television presenter renowned in the East of England for his Anglia Television programmes - particularly the Bygones series that ran from 1967 for twenty years. He was a director of Anglia TV in the company's infancy and its head of local programmes.

A farmer's son, Dick Joice was educated at Culford School before taking over his father's tenancy on the Norfolk estate of the Marquess Townshend in 1940. It was a chance conversation with his landlord in 1958 that launched his career into television. Townshend, chairman of the new Anglia Television company, recognised that programmes for the farming community would be a vital part of the service and asked Dick to help.

From 1959 Joice presented Anglia's weekly Farming Diary as well as becoming the first host of the regional news magazine programme About Anglia in 1960. It was, however, his programme Bygones that had a tremendous impact in the region (despite being little known outside) and established him as a much-loved presenter.

Each half-hourly edition of Bygones explored East Anglian history and traditional crafts and featured mystery objects, about which Joice asked viewers, "Does anyone know what this was used for?" In two particularly memorable programmes (Horsemen and The Harvest directed by Geoffrey Weaver), Weaver assembled teams of men - some in their eighties - to demonstrate their now-lost skills with horses and in the fields.

In his autobiography, Full Circle, Joice wrote that he ‘...was born with a naturally acquisitive and inquisitive nature, always wanting to find out how things worked and where they came from;’ and his own collection of bygone agricultural and domestic items was enormous. In 1979 this lifetime collection came to rest in the stable block at Holkham Hall after Lord Leicester acquired it to complement his exhibition celebrating the contribution of the Coke family to the Agricultural Revolution of the late 18th and 19th centuries.

Bygones was an Anglia local programme that made it to the ITV network, and, after Joice's death, it won the Royal Television Society Television Professionals' All-time Favourite Regional Series Award in 2000. The award was collected by Joice's wife Jean. He was featured in a BBC Radio 4 series, Norfolk Man broadcast in 1988.

Joice bought the watermill at Newton by Castle Acre in 1967 and rebuilt the millhouse.

== Television credits ==
- About Anglia
- Farming Diary
- Bygones
- Weavers Green
