= South Acre =

Hamlet in Norfolk, England

Coordinates: 52.69615°N 0.67555°E

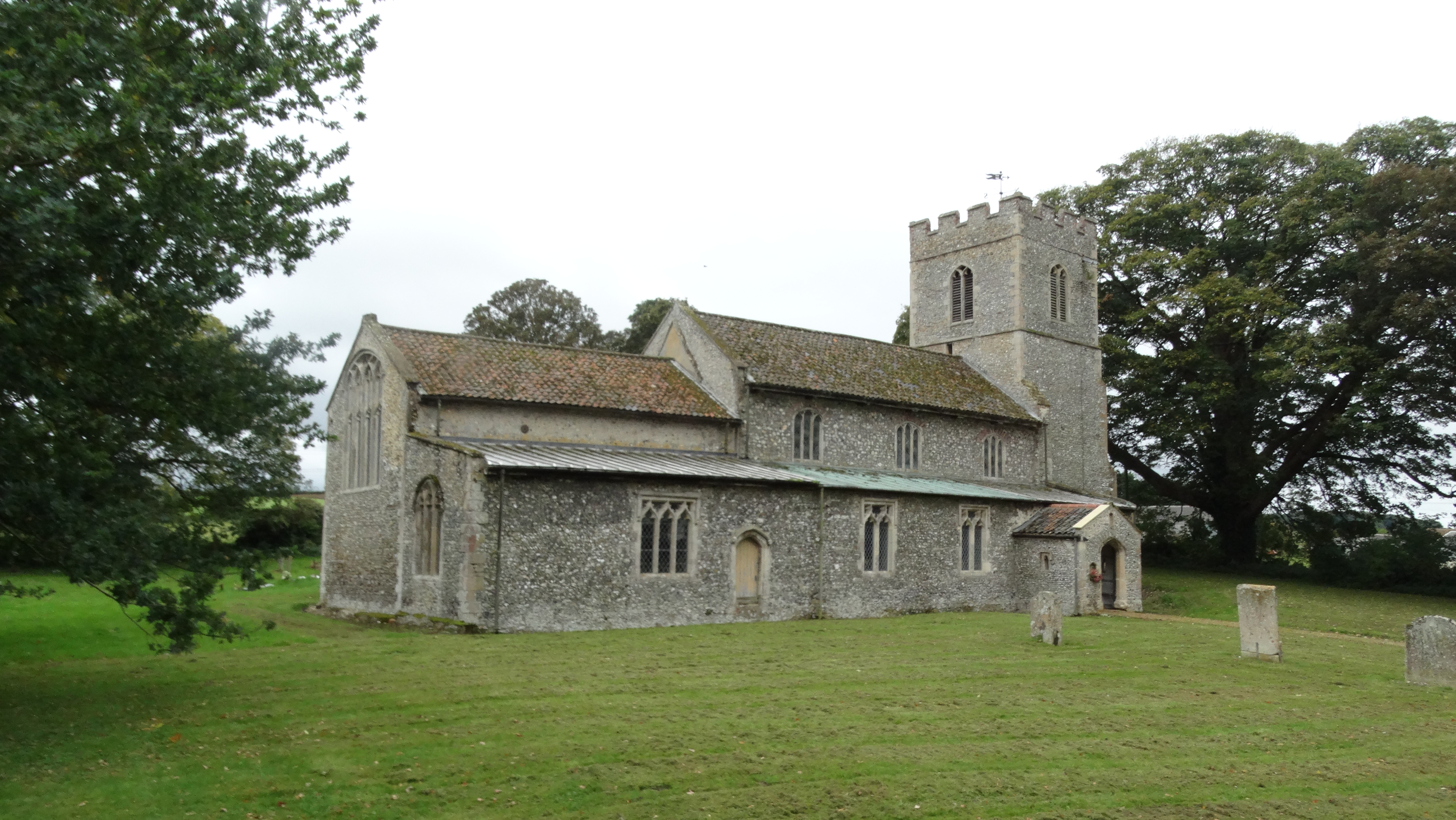
- St George's Church, South Acre

- Location within Norfolk
- Area: 7.91 km^{2} (3.05 sq mi)
- Population: 115 (2011)
  - Density: 15/km^{2} (39/sq mi)
- OS grid reference: TF 809 143
- Civil parish: South Acre
- District: Breckland
- Shire county: Norfolk
- Region: East
- Country: England
- Sovereign state: United Kingdom
- Post town: KING'S LYNN
- Postcode district: PE32
- Dialling code: 01760
- Police: Norfolk
- Fire: Norfolk
- Ambulance: East of England

South Acre is a village and civil parish in the English county of Norfolk. The village has almost disappeared, but the remnants are located about 1 km (0.62 mi) south-west of Castle Acre, 8 km (5.0 mi) north of the town of Swaffham, 20 km (12 mi) east of the town of King's Lynn and 50 km (31 mi) west of the city of Norwich. The River Nar flows between South Acre and Castle Acre.

The villages name means 'cultivated land'. 'South' to distinguish from Castle Acre and West Acre.

In 1441 the village was the scene of the attempted murder of an important member of the local gentry, Sir Geoffrey Harsyk. A gang of local yeomen and labourers occupied the main road, preventing passage along it, singing "we are Robbynhodesmen, war war war". This was a direct reference to the legends of Robin Hood that were particularly popular in Norfolk in the fifteenth century, and, indeed, it is probable that events such as this fed directly into later versions of the tales.

The civil parish has an area of 10.15 km^{2} (3.92 sq mi) and in the 2001 census had a population of 32 in 13 households, at the 2011 Census Narford was included and the population increased to 115 in 47 households. For the purposes of local government, the parish falls within the district of Breckland.
