= Narborough Railway Line =

UK Site of Special Scientific Interest

Coordinates: 52°40′04″N 00°35′56″E

- Site of Special Scientific Interest
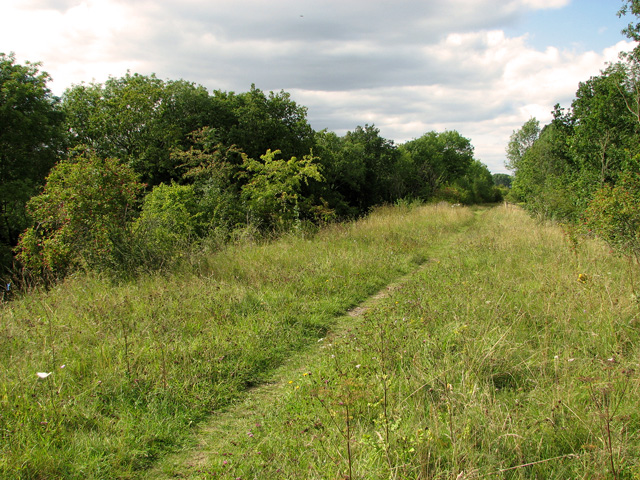
- Location of Narborough Railway Line.
- Area of search: Norfolk
- Grid reference: TF 754 113
- Interest: Biological
- Area: 7.9 hectares (20 acres)
- Notification date: 1989
- Location map: Magic Map

Narborough Railway Line or Narborough Railway Embankment is a 7.9-hectare (20-acre) biological Site of Special Scientific Interest south-east of King's Lynn in Norfolk, England. It is a former railway embankment which is now a nature reserve managed by the Norfolk Wildlife Trust. It is 1 kilometre (0.62 mi) south of Narborough, on the A47 going east from King's Lynn to Swaffham, and it can be entered by a car park west of the reserve. It was documented in 1847 as an area with much chalk and flints.

== Geology ==
The area is made of chalk grassland, which grew when Great Eastern Railways engineers cleared the area. The underlying chalk was only exposed when they dug a borrow pit next to an embankment.

== Railway line ==
The Lynn and Dereham Railway, which weaved a 26.5-mile (42.6 km) route to East Dereham via Narborough and Swaffham, was authorised by the Lynn and Dereham Railway Act 1845 (8 & 9 Vict. c. cxxvi), given royal assent on 21 July 1845. It opened in stages between 1846 and 1848. This later became part of the Great Eastern Railway. Only the section of line between King's Lynn and Narborough was opened under the L&DR, on 17 October 1846. The remainder of the line was opened in stages by the L&DR's immediate successor, the East Anglian Railway. The East Anglian Line was opened in August 1847, after three and a half years of construction. Narborough joined this, and initially went to Lynn, then expanded to Narborough and to Swaffham.

The railway was first used by the post office to deliver post around Norfolk. The railway operated between Dereham and King's Lynn and was closed in 1960. The railway was on the King's Lynn to Norwich line. In 1958, Narborough Railway Line hired their first full-time stationmaster, Rod Lock, who at the time was a relief stationmaster for the whole of Norfolk. He had to deal with the severe 1958 blizzards, which buried some of the trains.

== Wildlife ==
At Narborough Railway Line there are 26 species of butterfly recorded and there are a large quantity of birds in the summer months. The reserve is closed when there are sheep on the site. The most common birds are blackcap, chiffchaff and common whitethroat. In the summer there are turtle doves and in the winter there are blackbirds, fieldfare and redwing.

In the earlier half of the year (spring and summer), these are often popular sights: grizzled skipper, brown argus, purple hairstreak, eyebright, small scabious, kidney vetch, dingy, grayling, large thyme, marjoram autumn gentian and carline thistle. In the later half of the year (autumn and winter), purging buckthorns are popular.
