= Andrew Fountaine (MP) =

English Member of Parliament

Andrew Fountaine (c. 1637 – 7 February 1707), of Narford, Norfolk and Bell Bar, North Mymms, Hertfordshire, was an English Member of Parliament. He represented Newtown in March 1679, October 1679 and 1681.

His son, also Andrew Fountaine, was an important art collector.
