= Bygones (TV series) =

Television series

Bygones is an Anglia Television documentary series exploring East Anglian history and traditional rural crafts. Bygones won the Royal Television Society Television Professionals' All-time Favourite Regional Series Award in 2000.

It first ran from 1967 to 1989 and returned in 2007 for two more series. The series, and in particular the regular Bygones Specials featured many interviews with people who used to do traditional work now lost to history (such as using a horse-drawn plough or threshing) and investigation and preservation of surviving East Anglian culture.

Bygones was presented by Dick Joice from 1967 until his retirement in 1987 when the film historian John Huntley took over. It was made by the Norwich-based television company Anglia for the ITV network. The series was discontinued in 1989, but briefly brought back by Anglia TV in 2007 following an overwhelming vote from viewers on a programme they wanted reinstated.

It features mystery objects where the audience are asked to write in and guess what the implement's original function was. Joice's collection of objects which featured in Bygones was on display at Holkham Hall, Norfolk, from 1979, in the former stables.

Some of the most memorable editions of Bygones are documentaries directed by Geoffrey Weaver. "The Harvest" re-created a harvest field around the turn of the 20th century, while "Gone For a Burton" followed the seasonal trip of East Anglian agricultural workers to work in the maltings of Burton upon Trent after the hay and grain harvests.

Bygones has a distinctive theme tune played on a player piano (not a barrel organ).

Its 2007 revival was presented by Eddie Anderson, former assistant of the original presenter Dick Joice, and Wendy Hurrell. Antique dealer Alan Smith often presented a section as well.
