= John Huntley (film historian) =

British film historian

John Frederick Huntley (18 July 1921 – 7 August 2003) was an English film historian, educator and archivist.

Huntley was born in Kew, London on 18 July 1921 and entered the film industry as a teaboy at Denham Studios around 1938. After war service in the RAF, where he had a sideline in using film shows as an educational tool, he re-entered the film industry as an assistant to film score conductor Muir Mathieson; Huntley had briefly studied at the Royal College of Music just after the war began.

He joined the British Film Institute in 1952, initially working for the information department, but from 1955 in distribution. His connection with the Telekinema during the Festival of Britain led to his being appointed as a programmer at the new National Film Theatre for a time. According to film collector Kevin Brownlow, Huntley was the most accessible of the BFI's staff because of his skill at bending the rules. He left the institute in 1974.

With one of his two daughters Amanda Huntley, he set up Huntley Film Archives, in 1984, based from 2005 in Herefordshire.

John Huntley was a published author. His published works include British Film Music (1947), Railways in the Cinema (1969) and Railways on the Screen (1993).

Huntley was also a regular broadcaster. He presented Bioscope Days for the BBC (BBC2) in 1978, the Anglia Television series Bygones for two years from 1987, and a later similar series, Attic Archives, for BBC Scotland. He worked for Video 125 for a short period.

He died from cancer in London, England in August 2003.

== Huntley Film Archives ==
Huntley, with one of his two daughters, Amanda, set up the Huntley Film Archives in 1984. From 2005, it has been based in Herefordshire.

Huntley Film Archives celebrated its 40th anniversary since its foundation in 2023. It has worked on countless archives-based documentaries from around the world, along with museum projects, adverts, educational resources, art installations, where ever archive film is enjoyed. The film collection, nearly all documentary, within the Huntley Film Archives has now risen to nearly 100,000 unique film elements and it continues to collect and preserve celluloid-based documentaries back to 1895.

Directors Amanda Huntley and Robert Dewar together with their team of film archivists and restorers received the Focal International Award for best Archive Company of the Year in 2023.
