= Castle Acre Priory =

Priory in Castle Acre, Norfolk, England (1089–1537)

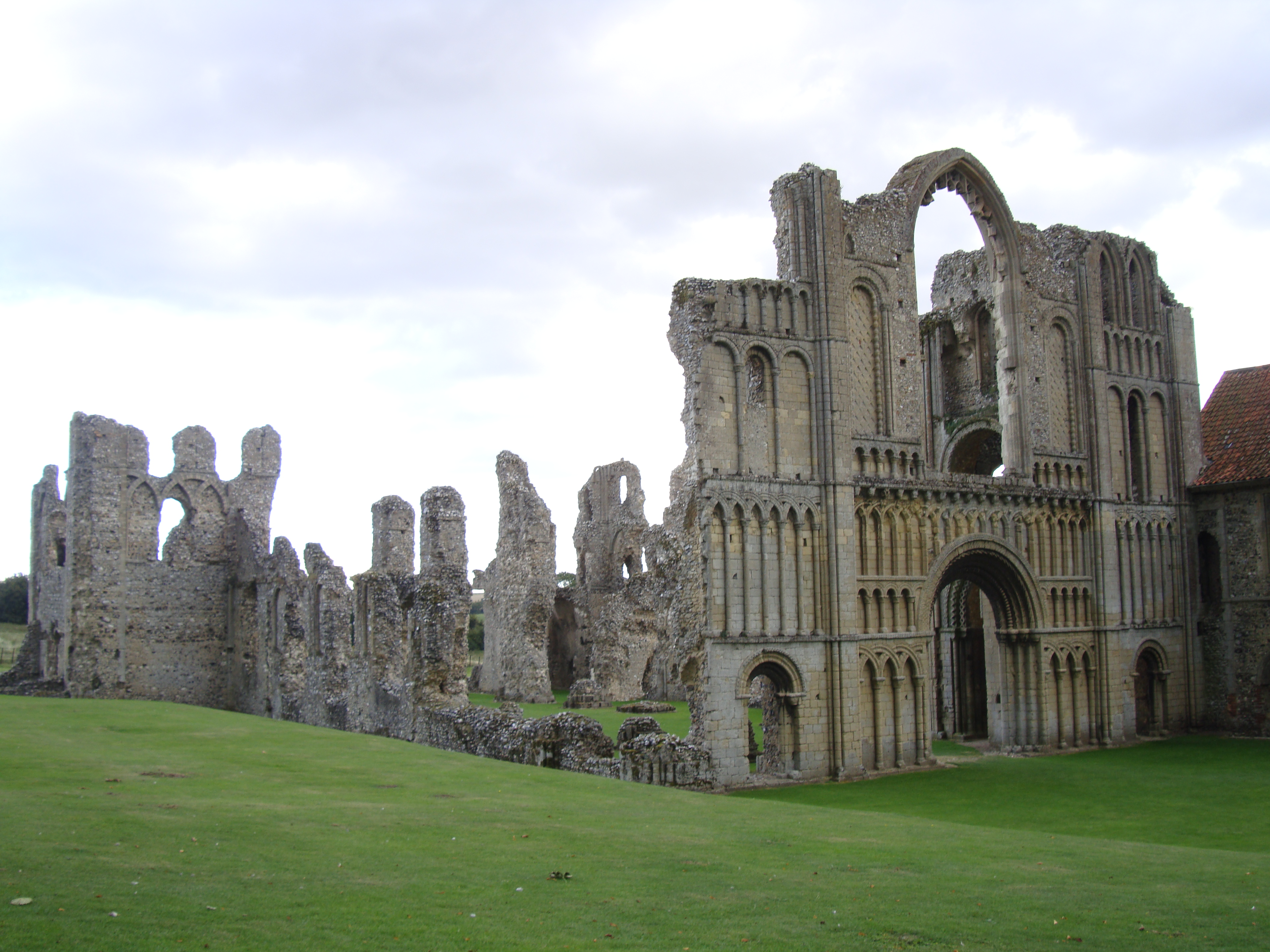
- The extant remains of Castle Acre Priory church

- Location within Norfolk

Monastery information
- Order: Benedictine
- Established: 1089
- Disestablished: 1537

People
- Founder: William de Warenne, 2nd Earl of Surrey

Site
- Location: Castle Acre, Norfolk, England
- Coordinates: 52°42′1.9″N 0°41′0.8″E

Castle Acre Priory was a Cluniac priory in the village of Castle Acre, Norfolk, England, dedicated to St Mary, St Peter, and St Paul. It is thought to have been founded in 1089 by William de Warenne, 2nd Earl of Surrey (the son of the 1st Earl of Surrey who had founded England's first Cluniac priory at Lewes in 1077). The order originated from Burgundy. Originally the priory was sited within the walls of Castle Acre Castle, but this proved too small and inconvenient for the monks; hence, the priory was relocated to the present site in the castle grounds about one year later.

The priory was dissolved in 1537, and its ruins are in the care of English Heritage, along with the nearby Castle Acre Bailey Gate and Castle Acre Castle.

== Description ==
The church itself was consecrated sometime between 1146 and 1148. While the Warenne family may have been the main benefactors of the priory, others also gave generously to it, for example Scolland of Bedale, steward of Alan Earl of Richmond, who was in fact buried there. Like other Cluniac houses, Castle Acre Priory was directly subject to the authority of the Abbot of Cluny; for practical reasons, however, the Prior of Lewes was usually instructed to act for the abbot when any problems arose at Castle Acre. However, this obedience owed to a foreign abbot caused difficulties when the kings of England were at odds with France and/or Burgundy. In the mid 14th century the English Cluniacs settled this difficulty by buying a special legal recognition from the king as 'native' religious houses. The priory was home to some 20 to 30 monks.

The nave of the church is one of the oldest parts of the ruin. Subsequent additions continued to be added until the priory was dissolved in 1537 under Henry VIII, and when the King gave the dissolved priory to the Duke of Norfolk complete with its estates, the remaining monks were turned out. The monks received, as with all monks who surrendered their house to the King, a pension from the crown reflecting the value of the property owned by the monastery at the time of the dissolution.

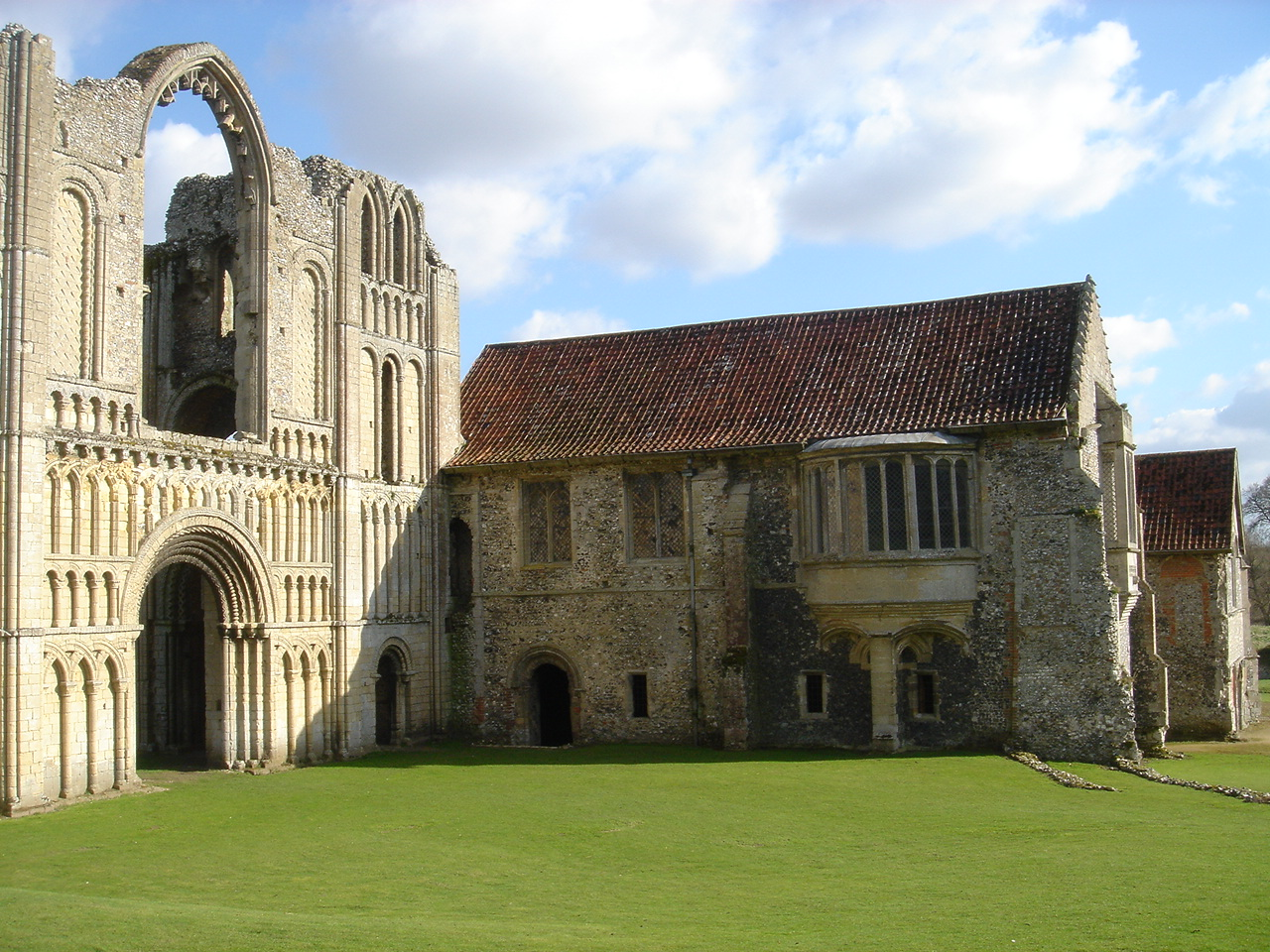
The West Front and Prior's Lodging

The estates eventually passed to Sir Edward Coke, whose descendant, the Earl of Leicester now owns the ruins and Castle Acre Castle.

The ruins today are very impressive, the great west front of the building is almost complete, and the prior's lodging is in a similar condition.

== Media appearances ==
The priory is seen extensively in the 1964 film The Tomb of Ligeia (directed by Roger Corman and starring Vincent Price). It was also used in the award-winning Children's TV Show Knightmare (as 'The Ruins of Dungarth') and features prominently in the 2009 film Glorious 39.

== See also ==
- List of monastic houses in Norfolk
- List of monastic houses in England
