= Andrew Fountaine (art collector) =

English antiquarian, art collector and amateur architect

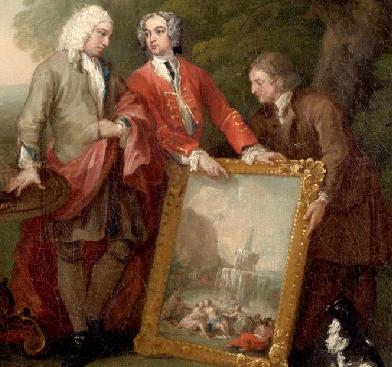
Detail of Conversation Piece (Portrait of Sir Andrew Fountaine with Other Men and Women) by William Hogarth, c. 1730–35 – Fountaine is probably the figure on the far left, with a red sash and his left hand tucked into his brown jacket.

Sir Andrew Fountaine (1676 in Salle, Norfolk – 4 September 1753 in Narford Hall, Narford), son and heir of Andrew Fountaine MP of Salle, Norfolk and Sarah Chicheley, one of the daughters of Sir Thomas Chicheley, was an English antiquarian, art collector and amateur architect.

== Life ==
Attending Eton College (as a King's Scholar) and then Christ Church, Oxford (graduating BA in 1697), William Cavendish, 2nd Duke of Devonshire (a friend of his father) introduced him at court and he received a knighthood in 1699 for the Latin oration he had made to William III on his entry to Oxford the previous year (a task he had been selected for by Christ Church's dean Henry Aldrich).

When shortly afterwards Lord Macclesfield took the Act of Settlement to the elector of Hanover in 1701, the younger Andrew Fountaine accompanied him and thus became known in the courts of Europe in what became the first of his two grand tours. He was in correspondence with Gottfried Leibniz between 1701 and 1704, was admitted to the Royal Society of Berlin, became friends with Cosimo III de' Medici, Grand Duke of Tuscany on travelling to Italy in 1702, and was part of the mission to the States General of the Dutch Republic in 1705 (using it as an opportunity to add to his book and coin collections).

On his father's death in 1707, he was appointed Gentleman Usher of the Black Rod for Ireland and, while accompanying Thomas Herbert, 8th Earl of Pembroke to open the Irish parliament, became friends with Jonathan Swift (as is mentioned in Swift's letters and his Journal to Stella). He took a second grand tour in 1714, collecting maiolica, paintings and sculpture for himself and for the Earls of Pembroke (he later catalogued the 8th Earl's collection for his son the 9th earl). He succeeded Walter Cary as warden of the Royal Mint 12 August 1727, but retired from London in 1732 or 1733 to redesign the family seat of Narford Hall (working with the professional architect Roger Morris). At Narford he hung a portrait of his patroness Caroline of Ansbach on the staircase (she had made him her vice-chamberlain and tutor to her third son, William Augustus, and was William's proxy for his installation as Knight of the Bath on 17 June 1725).

Price's Name Act 1765
- Act of Parliament
- Parliament of Great Britain
- Long title: An Act to enable Brigg Price Esquire and his Issue to take and use the Surname of Fountaine, and to bear the Arms of Sir Andrew Fountaine Knight, deceased.
- Citation: 5 Geo. 3. c. 55 Pr.
- Territorial extent: Great Britain

Dates
- Royal assent: 19 April 1765
- Commencement: 10 January 1765 (Note: Start of session.)

Status: Current legislation

He died unmarried in Narford in 1753, and was buried there. When sold and dispersed in 1884, his collection was so large it took four days to auction. His Narford estate passed to his sister Elizabeth and down to her grandson Brigg Price, who changed his surname to Fountaine and adopted his great-uncle's arms by a private act of Parliament, Price's Name Act 1765 (5 Geo. 3. c. 55 Pr.).

== Portrait miniatures collection ==
On 28 April 1733, there was a terrible destruction of Fountaine's collection of portrait miniatures in a fire at White's Chocolate and Coffee House. Fountaine had rented two rooms at White's to temporarily hold his huge collection of portrait miniatures by Nicolas Hilliard, the Olivers, Samuel Cooper, and others. The entire house burned down; the number of paintings destroyed was so large that the ashes were carefully sifted to recover the gold from the incinerated mountings of the miniatures.
