= Narborough Bone Mill =

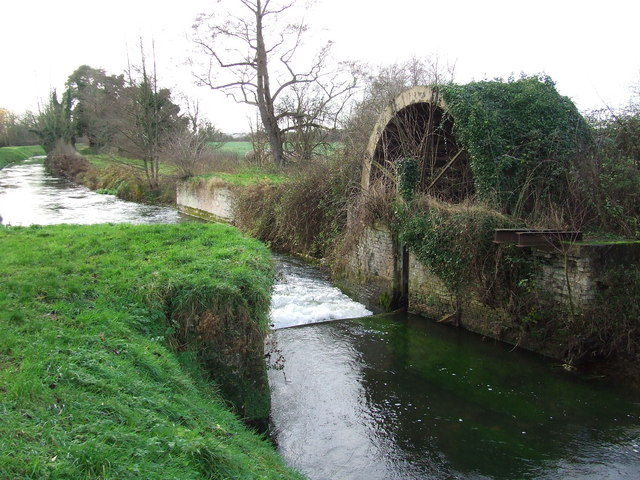
- The waterwheel of the Narborough Bone Watermill

- Narborough bone mill within King's Lynn and West Norfolk

General information
- Type: Watermill
- Location: River Nar, Narborough, England
- Coordinates: 52°40′58″N 0°33′39″E
- Opened: c. 1820

Narborough Bone Mill was a watermill that operated on the River Nar in the west of the English county of Norfolk. The watermill was 1 mile (1.6 km) downstream of the village of Narborough. The mill was built in the early part of the 19th century and records show that it was owned by the Marriott Brothers in 1830, who also owned the navigation rights on the river Nar. The site is currently owned by the Munford family of Narborough and is undergoing preservation work following a recent lottery grant. More info at bonemill.org.uk

== Operations ==
The watermill was used for the rendering down into agricultural fertilizer of bones from the local slaughterhouses and from the whaling industry. Bones were carried up the River Nar by barge from the blubber-processing factory at Lynn. 7.5 miles (12.1 km) to the north on the River Cong stands Congham watermill. Whales were carried there by horse and cart to be processed. The bones were then carried to Narborough for rendering. Both mills were in remote locations, possibly because of the distinctive smell that would have been prevalent. The fact that Narborough watermill was not near a road did not matter, as both its raw materials and its finished products were carried by horse-drawn barge. The River Nar navigation was opened in 1759 and was used to carry coal and grain.

== Production ==
Precise details of the reduction process have not been recorded at Narborough, but the usual procedure was that the bones were first boiled to make them brittle and to remove the fat. The fat would be skimmed off, and used for such things as coach and cart grease. The bones would be either chopped by hand or put through a toothed cylinder. Either process would reduce the bones to smaller, more manageable pieces. In the final process, the millstones powered by the waterwheel would grind the bone into powder.

== Human bones ==
At one time the bone rendering watermill was used for a rather gruesome practice. The exhumed remains of cemeteries and burial grounds from the north German city of Hamburg were shipped to King's Lynn and taken to the mill to be processed into agricultural fertilizer. At the time no-one questioned the ethics of the trade, as it was said that "One ton of German bone-dust saves the importation of ten tons of German corn".

== Closure ==
In 1884 Nar Valley Drainage Board purchased the navigation rights to the Nar and subsequently built a sluice that prevented further river traffic. The mill ceased production a few years after this event, probably as a consequence of the Drainage Board's actions. In 1915 the watermill was still standing, but the buildings were demolished bit by bit over the next few years. The machinery went to scrap, and most of the rubble was put down on farm tracks. Today all that remains is the 16-foot-diameter (4.9 m) waterwheel and the remains of the wall of the main mill building. Heritage lottery funding has been obtained to carry out refurbishment of the waterwheel and restoration work started in 2015. For more information see bonemill.org.uk
