= West Acre =

Village in Norfolk, England

Coordinates: 52.706°N 0.633°E

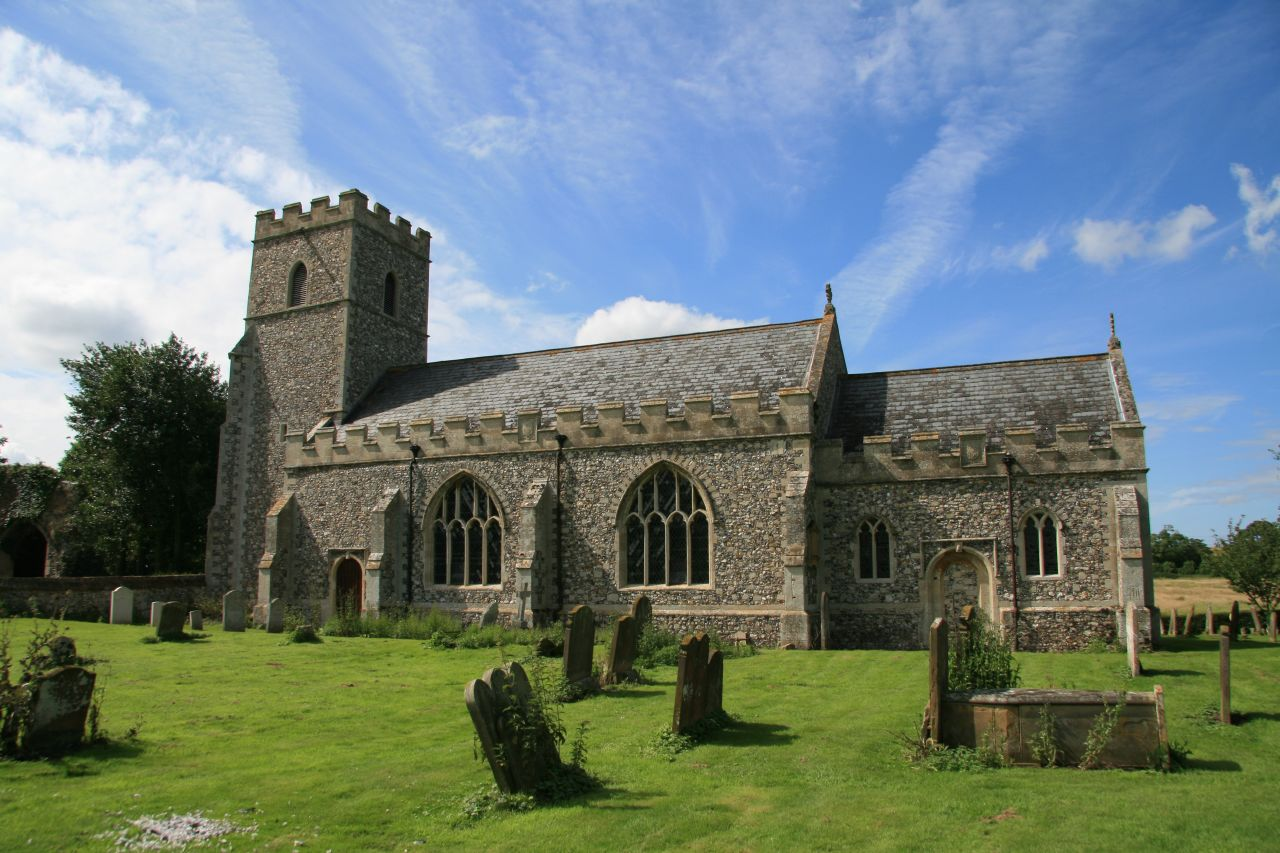
- All Saints' Church

- Location within Norfolk
- Area: 14.49 km^{2} (5.59 sq mi)
- Population: 260 (Including East Walton 2011)
  - Density: 18/km^{2} (47/sq mi)
- OS grid reference: TF779152
- Civil parish: West Acre
- District: King's Lynn and West Norfolk
- Shire county: Norfolk
- Region: East
- Country: England
- Sovereign state: United Kingdom
- Post town: KING'S LYNN
- Postcode district: PE32
- Dialling code: 01760
- Police: Norfolk
- Fire: Norfolk
- Ambulance: East of England
- UK Parliament: North West Norfolk

West Acre is a village and civil parish in the King's Lynn and West Norfolk district of the county of Norfolk, England. It covers an area of 14.49 km^{2} (5.59 sq mi) and had a population of 187 in 83 households at the 2001 census, the population increasing to 260 at the 2011 Census.

All Saints' Church is a Grade I listed building. Duration Brewing is a craft brewery with a shop and taproom. West Acre Theatre is a theatre, cinema and arts workshop created from a converted Primitive Methodist chapel. West Acre Priory of St Mary and All Saints was a monastic house, founded c.1100 by the de Toni family; the ruined priory gatehouse is Grade I listed.

The village is on the Nar Valley Way pathway. West Acre is a parish of the Kings Lynn and West Norfolk district council, which is responsible for the most local services. Norfolk County Council is responsible for roads, some schools and social services. For Westminster elections the parish forms part of the North West Norfolk constituency, represented by James Wild (Conservative).

== See also ==
- Castle Acre
- South Acre
