= Narborough, Norfolk =

Village in Norfolk, England

Coordinates: 52.682136°N 0.582493°E

Narborough
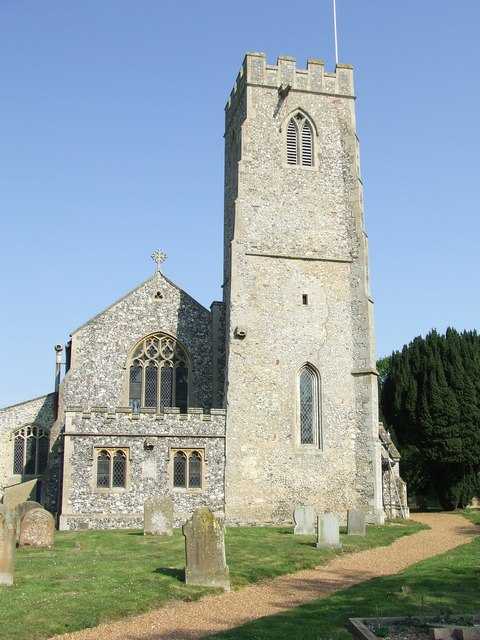
- All Saints' Church, Narborough

- Location within Norfolk
- Area: 14.05 km^{2} (5.42 sq mi)
- Population: 1,094 (2011 census)
  - Density: 78/km^{2} (200/sq mi)
- OS grid reference: TF745125
- District: Breckland
- Shire county: Norfolk
- Region: East
- Country: England
- Sovereign state: United Kingdom
- Post town: KING'S LYNN
- Postcode district: PE32
- Dialling code: 01760
- Police: Norfolk
- Fire: Norfolk
- Ambulance: East of England
- UK Parliament: South West Norfolk

Narborough is a village of 1405 hectares in the Breckland district of Norfolk, England, with a population of 1,094 at the 2011 census. It is situated in the Nar Valley, with the river Nar flowing through on its way to the River Great Ouse.

== Etymology ==
The village's name probably means 'fortification at the narrow place'. The River Nar is a back-formation from the place-name.

== Community ==
The village has a large community centre and associated heritage centre which puts on exhibitions. The parish church is All Saints' in the Benefice of Narborough, and part of the Nar Valley group of parishes.

Narborough Primary School serves the village with around ninety pupils and five teachers. The present school was opened in 1987. It replaced the old village school situated on the outskirts of the village, which had served the children of Narborough and Narford for 117 years.

Narborough Hall, set in eighteenth-century parkland by the River Nar, is surrounded by lakes, gardens and woods. It holds exhibitions and events in the grounds with a café open at these times. The Hall dates from the 16th century and is Grade II* Listed.

The Narborough Trout & Coarse Lakes are in the village with trout and coarse fishing and its own smokery.

The village is on the Nar Valley Way path.

Narborough is the location of Burntstalks Solar Farm, one of a growing number of solar farms in Britain. It covers 61 acres and generates 11.5 MW of electricity. The development has been criticised by the CPRE, The Countryside Charity.

== Mill ==
Narborough Mill was built c.1780, although several additions, renovations and modifications have been undertaken since then. The structure is three storeys high and built of brick with a single locum and a pantiled roof. It has distinctive large recessed brick arches. The rear still has some weatherboarding and it is quite possible the upper storeys were also of weatherboard in the early days. Charles Tyssen enlarged the mill in 1845 with a poorly built extension, the foundations of which slowly sank over many years until part of the roof collapsed in 1980. This complete section, along with the Victorian miller's house built onto the front, had to be demolished. Thirteen 50-foot piles had to be sunk in order to make the building safe when restoration began. The 1897 plan shows an engine house on the front of the building. This was converted into the miller's residence soon after. At that time the tributary was made wider and deeper than the parallel stretch of the River Nar, providing an adequate fall of water and more power to drive the wheel.

== RAF Narborough ==
Narborough aerodrome was opened in May 1915 and used principally for defence against Zeppelin raids. The aerodrome was complemented by a separate base just a few miles down the road at Marham. During the First World War RAF Narborough was the largest aerodrome in Britain, but was closed following the end of hostilities. The last hangar, latterly used by farmers, was demolished in mid 1977 after having been damaged by gales.

== Landmarks ==
- Narborough Watermill
- Narborough Bone Mill
- Narborough Railway Line
