= Castle Acre =

Village and civil parish in Norfolk, England

Coordinates: 52.703°N 0.686°E

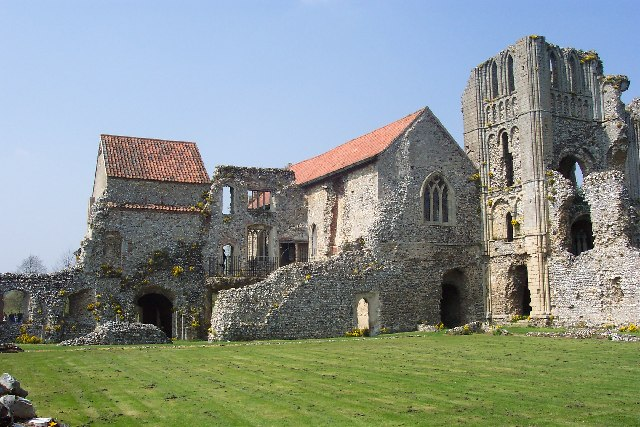
- Castle Acre Priory

- Location within Norfolk
- Area: 13.18 km^{2} (5.09 sq mi)
- Population: 862 (2021)
  - Density: 65/km^{2} (170/sq mi)
- OS grid reference: TF816151
  - London: 103 miles (166 km)
- District: King's Lynn and West Norfolk
- Shire county: Norfolk
- Region: East
- Country: England
- Sovereign state: United Kingdom
- Post town: KING'S LYNN
- Postcode district: PE32
- Dialling code: 01760
- Police: Norfolk
- Fire: Norfolk
- Ambulance: East of England
- UK Parliament: North West Norfolk

Castle Acre is a village and civil parish in the English county of Norfolk. On the River Nar, it is 4 miles (6.4 km) north of Swaffham and 26 miles (42 km) west of Norwich.

At the 2021 census, the population of Castle Acre was 862, a slight increase from 848 at the 2011 census.

== History ==
Castle Acre is named for Castle Acre Castle, a Norman castle built in 1085 by William de Warenne in order to enforce his control over his East Anglian lands. By the 12th century, the castle passed into the ownership of Hamelin Plantagenet who hosted both Henry II and Edward I in Castle Acre. By the 16th century, the castle lay mainly derelict, yet had a procession of illustrious owners including Thomas Howard, Thomas Cecil and Edward Coke. Today, the castle is maintained by English Heritage.

In the Domesday Book, Castle Acre is listed with West Acre as a settlement of 130 households in the hundred of Freebridge. It divided between the estates of William de Warenne, Ely Cathedral and Ralph de Tosny.

Also in the village are the ruins of Castle Acre Priory, established in 1090 by William de Warenne for an order of Cluniac monks. The monastery fell into disrepair after Dissolution of the monasteries in the 16th century. The priory is maintained by English Heritage.

== St. James' Church ==
Castle Acre's parish church is dedicated to Saint James and dates to the Fourteenth Century. St. James' is located at the junction between High Street and South Acre and has been a Grade I listed building since 1960. The churchtower was largely rebuilt in the Fifteenth Century in the Perpendicular style with a further restoration in the 1870s by Ewan Christian. The church boasts an ornate font cover and a painted pulpit with damage from firearms dating from the Seventeenth and Eighteenth Centuries.

== Notable people ==
- William de Warenne, 1st Earl of Surrey (1035–1088) Norman nobleman, lived in Castle Acre.
- Gundred, Countess of Surrey (???–1085) Flemish noblewoman, died in Castle Acre.
- William de Warenne, 2nd Earl of Surrey (???–1138) Anglo-Norman nobleman, lived in Castle Acre.
- Hamelin de Warenne, Earl of Surrey (1130–1202) Anglo-Angevin nobleman, lived in Castle Acre.
- Thomas Howard, 4th Duke of Norfolk (1536–1572) nobleman and politician, lived in Castle Acre.
- Thomas Cecil, 1st Earl of Exeter (1542–1623) politician, courtier and soldier, lived in Castle Acre.
- Edward Coke (1552–1634) barrister, judge and politician, lived in Castle Acre.
