= River Nar =

River in England

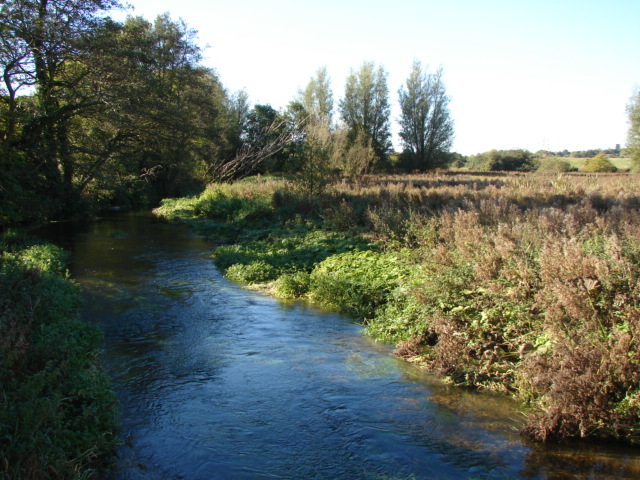
- The River Nar at Castle Acre

Location
- Country: England
- Counties: Norfolk

Physical characteristics
- Source
  - location: Tittleshall
  - coordinates: 52.7491°N 0.8120°E
  - elevation: 70 m (230 ft)
- Mouth: River Great Ouse
  - location: Kings Lynn
  - coordinates: 52.7478°N 0.3944°E
  - elevation: 0 m (0 ft)
- Length: 15 mi (24 km)

Basin features
- River system: River Great Ouse

River Nar
- Site of Special Scientific Interest
- Location of River Nar.
- Area of search: Norfolk
- Grid reference: TF 813 160
- Interest: Biological
- Area: 212.4 hectares (525 acres)
- Notification date: 1992
- Location map: Magic Map

The River Nar is a river in England, a chalk stream and tributary of the River Great Ouse. It rises at Mileham near Litcham in Norfolk and flows 15 miles west through Castle Acre and Narborough (the latter giving the Nar its name), joining the Ouse at King's Lynn. It has had a variety of alternative names, such as the Setch, the Sandringham, and Lynn Flu, though these are rarely, if ever, used today. In 2011 the Nar was recognised by the Environment Agency as one of the top ten most improved rivers in England and Wales.

The final section of the river near its mouth was diverted northwards when the Great Ouse was re-routed to a new outfall at King's Lynn after the thirteenth century. The river was made navigable from its mouth to Narborough and probably to West Acre as a result of an Act of Parliament obtained in 1751. Ten single-gate sluices and a pen sluice (or pound lock) were used to handle the change in level. The use of the river declined rapidly after the opening of a railway from King's Lynn to Dereham between 1846 and 1848. In 1884, the river was taken over by the River Nar Drainage Board, and closed to navigation, when an un-navigable sluice was constructed to the south of a Manure Factory in King's Lynn. A new sluice very close to the junction with the Great Ouse has been built more recently.

The river has been used to power a number of mills over the centuries. The buildings or remains of five are still visible, and some still contain original machinery. Narborough Bone Mill had no road access, and bones from the whaling industry and from cemeteries in Hamburg were delivered by barge, to be ground into bone meal. The mill closed when the river was taken over, and just the mill wheel remains on the bank.

The river is a 42-kilometre (26-mile) long biological Site of Special Scientific Interest.

== Route ==
The river rises from springs on the chalk uplands close to the 200-foot (60 m) contour to the south-west of Tittleshall. It initially flows to the east and then to the south to cross under the B1145 Litcham Road to the west of Mileham. Turning to the west, it passes through the south of Litcham and enters a series of lakes at Lexham Hall, where it is joined by Broad Water. Lexham Hall is a large grade I listed mansion, which was built around 1700. During the Second World War, the estate was occupied by the army, and the grounds and house were severely damaged. It was bought by William Foster in 1946, who gradually restored it, assisted by the architect Jim Fletcher Watson. The gardens are open to the public on selected weekends during the year, although the house is not. Continuing westwards, the river reaches the lakes of West Lexham Hall. It is joined by a stream flowing northwards from Little Dunham before it crosses under the A1065 road and flows through Emanuel's Common. The disused Newton water mill is passed before the river reaches the village of Newton. By the time it reaches Castle Acre it is below the 100-foot (30 m) contour.

The river is now wider and starts to form meanders. It passes more lakes at South Acre Hall, a large farmhouse parts of which date from the sixteenth century, and then crosses Castle Acre Common, and there are several lakes in Big Wood. A mill was located at the end of the wood. The main channel and the mill bypass both cross a minor road at fords. At West Acre the river passes the remains of an Augustinian priory and then Narford Lake, by Narford Hall. The remains of the priory are grade II listed and a scheduled monument. The Hall is grade I listed, and was built between 1690 and 1704 by Andrew Fountaine of Salle in Norfolk. It was enlarged in the 1830s. The river passes to the north of Narborough, where there are lakes and a fish farm. The A47 Narborough Bypass crosses, as does the original main road to Narborough, beside which is a former water mill, built in the eighteenth century and repaired in the late twentieth, which still contains much of the milling machinery. The Lynn and Dereham Railway line used to cross to the west of Narborough, but it is now dismantled. The Nar Valley Way, a long-distance footpath which has been following the valley for most of the length of the river now runs along the river bank. Numerous drainage ditches are associated with the next stretch of the river, and after passing Abbey Farm, where there are the remains of another Augustinian Priory, the river is embanked, with flood banks on both sides. The Nar Valley Way crosses from the south bank to the north at the start of the embanking.

Some large lakes are located to the north of the channel, which were formerly a sand and gravel pit. High Bridge carries the road from Blackborough End to Wormegay over the river, and Setchey Bridge carries the A10 road at Setchey. A little to the west, the channel turns to the north, where it is crossed by the railway line from Downham Market to King's Lynn. The A47 road, the A148 road and another minor road cross at South Lynn, and the river then joins the River Great Ouse at a sluice.

== Hydrology ==
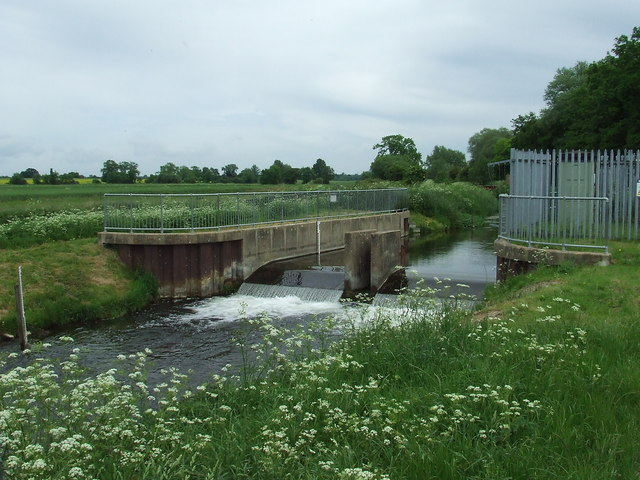
The gauging station near Marham Fen, downstream from Narborough

There is a gauging station at Marham, which records river data by measuring the flow over a flume. The catchment area of the river above this point is 59.2 square miles (153.3 km^{2}) and the area receives an average of 27.3 inches (693 mm) of rain each year. This results in an average daily flow of 22 million gallons (100 Megalitres (Ml)), although flows reached nearly twice this value in February 1977. The geology of the upper river consists of chalk covered by a layer of boulder clay, making it one of only a few remaining fenland chalk streams. At its source, the river is formed by surface runoff from the clay soils, but this is soon supplemented by springs in the chalk aquifer to the east of Litcham, which create a rapidly flowing chalk river. Rainfall is purified as it passes through the chalk, and the spring water, which is crystal clear, alkaline, and always cool, gives the river its chalk stream characteristic. For this reason, the whole of the river is a designated Site of Special Scientific Interest, one of only ten chalk streams which have been designated in this way in the United Kingdom.

In 2011 the Nar was recognised by the Environment Agency as one of the top ten most improved rivers in England and Wales, and was ranked seventh in the list. Historically, the engineering of the channel, to make it straighter, deeper and wider, first for navigation and later for land drainage, took no account of the destruction of habitat which such action causes. Some improvement has been made by setting the flood banks further back from the channel, and creating artificial meanders within the resultant flood plain. Structures which inhibit the passage of animal life, such as weirs, have also been removed where possible. Other improvements have been achieved through the Catchment Sensitive Farming (CSF) scheme, which helps farmers to reduce the runoff of pesticides and fertiliser into watercourses. The river provides habitat for sea trout, which are quite rare in East Anglia, while its banks are frequented by water voles and otters. 78 different types of river plants have been identified growing in or along it, which includes the southern marsh orchid, while insects found include 12 different species of dragonfly. Grey wagtails, kingfishers, reed warblers and willow and marsh tits are some of the constituents of the bird population.

== History ==
While most of the river channel follows its historic route, the section near the mouth has been altered. Below Setchey, it formerly flowed further west to Wiggenhall, where it turned to the north and was joined by the waters of the Gaywood River. However, the waters of the River Great Ouse and the River Cam, which once flowed to Wisbech, were diverted northwards to King's Lynn in the thirteenth century, and the Nar was also re-routed to join the new channel near King's Lynn. Although the precise date of the diversion is not known, there is a tradition that it was in 1236 after floods occurred in Littleport.

Powers to improve the river for navigation were obtained in 1751, when the people of King's Lynn, Narford, Narborough, Swaffham, and Castle Acre petitioned parliament and were granted an Act of Parliament to authorise the work. There was no opposition to the plans, which were intended to make the river navigable as far as West Acre. Commissioners were appointed, any nine of whom could agree to improve the river by constructing locks, removing annoyances, and creating towing paths. Tolls were specified, which could only be charged on goods travelling more than 220 yards (200 m) above the bridge at Setchey, and pleasure boats were also exempt from tolls. The carriage of guns and nets to catch wildfowl and fish was prohibited, and the commissioners could borrow money to finance the work, with the toll revenue acting as security.

There was an initial burst of activity, with the commissioners asking John Aram and Langley Edwards to produce a survey and estimate the cost of the work in June 1751, which was duly produced. The men recommended canalising some stretches of the river, and suggested that seven staunches and a pen sluice would be needed. A large basin would be constructed close to West Acre bridge. No further action was taken until 1757, when a treasurer was appointed. He advertised for subscribers, who would receive the toll revenues, and Langley Edwards was appointed to carry out the work. The navigation would be suitable for lighters holding 10 tonnes, and the locks would be large enough to hold a single lighter.

Edwards estimated that the cost would be £2,500, with staunches costing £50 each. Edward Everard, a merchant from King's Lynn, and Robert Crow, a gentleman from Swaffham, advanced £2,600 to fund the work, and Edwards was given the contract. It began at the end of September 1757, and he had just one year to complete it. He would not be paid until the work was completed. A year passed, and although £1,900 had been spent, the work was nowhere near complete. The completion date was moved to 1 January 1759, and then 15 February, after which Edwards would suffer a penalty of £20 per week until the work was completed. Two extra staunches were required, which the commissioners felt should be paid for by Edwards. He appealed, and was given until 3 August to complete the work, present his accounts, and justify his appeal. The works were finished by this date, but it is unclear who paid for the two staunches.

=== Operation ===
The Commissioners considered applying for a new Act of Parliament in 1760, to create a new cut linking the river at Setchey to the Great Ouse by the shortest route. Tolls for the half year ending in March 1761 amounted to £59 and yielded a profit of £26. The tolls were increased to the maximum allowed by the original act, and the clerk was asked to look at letting the tolls out, so that they did not have to finance their collection. At this point, the Commissioners appear to lose interest, and no further meetings were recorded. The Revd Henry Spelman purchased the interest in the navigation some time before 1770, and became the sole representative of the proprietors and subscribers. He stated that the commissioners had borrowed £3,500, and that with interest, the debt due to him had risen to £4,718. The navigation was unusable in parts, and believed that the commissioners had failed in their duties. He obtained a second Act of Parliament, under which £800 would be spent on improvements. He loaned the navigation £1,345 to cover the cost of the work and of obtaining the act, to be added to his existing debt, all of which would accrue interest at five per cent.

Although the act stated that the locks would be fitted with upper and lower gates, making them into pound locks, only Edwards' pen sluice, located beneath the A47 at Narborough, was constructed in this way. The ten staunches in the upper 5 miles (8.0 km) raised the level by 30 feet (9.1 m). Nine consisted of a single guillotine gate, while that at Upper Bonemill was fitted with mitre gates. The sluices were a little over 11 feet (3.4 m) wide, and although no evidence of any construction above Narborough has been found, it appears likely that it reached West Acre bridge. It also appears likely that branches at Wormegay and Blackborough Priory were navigable.

Records for the wharf at Narborough indicate that the main cargoes carried were coal, corn, malt and timber. Another Act of Parliament was obtained in 1815, in connection with draining and improving the parishes near Wormegay. This made provision for making the Nar deeper, wider and straighter. The locks were to be supervised by a civil engineer, with repair work to be carried out using oak timber, rather than fir. There was also provision for compensation for tolls lost as a result of the work.

=== Decline ===
By the middle of the nineteenth century, the Marriott brothers, who owned a wharf at Narborough, and whose business included malting and selling coal and corn, also controlled the navigation. They formed an association, with some local landowners, to resist the construction of the Lynn and Dereham Railway line from King's Lynn to Dereham. Their cause was not successful, and the line opened from King's Lynn to Narborough on 1846, and onwards to Dereham in 1848, after which trade on the river declined. An Act of Parliament for the Nar Valley Drainage scheme, obtained in 1881, included a clause to remove the need to maintain the river for navigation, and navigation to Narborough ceased in 1884, when construction of the Old Nar Tidal Sluice prevented boats from accessing the river at King's Lynn.

The final stretch of the river, called Friars Fleet, was used by steam tugs and barges delivering gas water from Cambridge Gas Works to the West Norfolk Farmers Manure Works until 1932. To the south of the factory, the tidal doors of the Old Nar Tidal Sluice prevented the tide passing further upstream. A wharf called Boal Quay was served by coasters, and fishing boats moored in the channel. With the removal of the Kings Lynn Harbour Branch railway line which crossed a large loop on this section, the river was diverted to a new sluice close to the Ouse, although two-thirds of the loop remains as a tidal inlet. To mitigate against flood risks, a flood diversion channel was constructed between the Nar and the Ouse Flood Relief Channel in 2001, at the point at which they are closest. A sluice was constructed in the flood bank, which is controlled by electric motors, and the new channel joins the Flood Relief Channel upstream from Saddlebow Bridge.

== Proposals ==
There were plans to make the final part of the river navigable again, as part of a scheme to create a non-tidal route from King's Lynn to the Great Ouse, which included a marina at Boal Quay and a sea lock near the final sluice. It would have been part of a much larger regeneration project for the south of the town, and the river would have been linked to the Great Ouse Flood Relief Channel, which currently terminates at a sluice a little to the south of the A47 road. Various routes for the connecting link were considered, but the preferred route was to utilise the flood diversion channel, constructed in 2001. This would have been enlarged, and the two bridges, located on Thiefgate Lane and the bank of the Flood Relief Channel, would have been rebuilt to provide more headroom. However, the non-tidal link was eventually abandoned, as there were concerns over environmental issues, the channel was thought to be too narrow to accommodate boats travelling in opposite directions, and some of the bridges would not have provided sufficient headroom. The scheme was modified to include a lock from the end of the flood relief channel back into the Ouse, with the sea lock and marina being retained. These plans have since been deferred, due to the change in the financial situation and the collapse of land values.

== Drainage ==
Most of the river is classified as a main river, and is therefore the responsibility of the Environment Agency. Below Narborough, the river acts as a highland carrier, as it is constrained by flood banks and the water level may be above the level of the surrounding land. Drainage from that land into the river is not, therefore, possible by gravity, and an area of 25.6 square miles (66 km^{2}) is managed by the East of Ouse, Polver and Nar Internal Drainage Board (IDB), who maintain drainage channels and pumping stations to mitigate the risk of flooding. Their area of responsibility, of which 87 percent is agricultural land, includes most of the Nar Valley. The catchment that supplies this area is much larger, at 46.89 square miles (121.4 km^{2}), as water flows from the higher ground around its edges. As the area is low-lying, a network of drainage ditches feeds into larger drains, and the IDB maintains seven pumping stations to discharge water into the main rivers. Six of these are at Polver, Nar Valley, Mill Fen, Mow Fen, Chain Bridge and Saddlebow. The Puny Drain formerly ran to a gravity outfall sluice in King's Lynn, but has been re-routed to discharge into the Ouse Relief Channel.

The Polver Drain runs along the south side of the river, and continues to the Ouse Relief Channel, where there is a pumping station. The Puny Drain runs to the north of the river, and turns to the north near Setchey. It formerly ran to a syphon which carried it under the Nar just upstream of the 1884 sluice, and ended at a gravity outlet on the bank of the Ouse. As part of the redevelopment of the area to the south of King's Lynn, the drain was re-routed to a new outfall some 2.5 miles (4 km) further upstream. This involved the construction of a new channel from West Winch Common to near Saddlebow Bridge. The route had to cross the main railway line into King's Lynn and the River Nar. To accommodate this, syphons were constructed under both. For the railway, a 25-foot (7.6 m) shaft was constructed on each side of the track to a depth of 39 feet (12 m), and two pipes connected the shafts, running around 33 feet (10 m) below the level of the tracks. A culvert 7 feet (2.1 m) in diameter was constructed beneath the Nar, at a depth of around 20 feet (6 m), and 13 feet (4 m) below the bed of the river. A new pumping station, consisting of three pumps and located at the inland end of the syphons, is capable of pumping 76M gallons (345 Ml) per day. The design uses syphon breaking valves to reduce the size of the pumps required, and hence the power consumption.

The scheme cost £5.5 million, and was achieved over an 18-month period starting in September 2006, after two years of negotiation with Railtrack to get the design for the tunnel under the railway approved. Around 1 mile (1.6 km) of new drain were constructed and 1.2 miles (1.9 km) of the existing drain were regraded. The project was complicated by the fact that much of the site it within the River Nar Site of Special Scientific Interest, and had to be approved by Natural England. The work was done in small sections to mitigate the impact on badgers, water voles and other wildlife. The final section of the original route, from the syphon under the River Nar to the Great Ouse, has since been filled in as it ran through the Nar Ouse Regeneration Area, and the first building to be built on the reclaimed land was St Michael's Primary School.

The construction of the flood diversion channel in 2001, to discharge excess water into the Ouse Flood Relief Channel, was part of a larger scheme, which included the raising of flood banks further upstream, and the provision of a flood storage area. To allow for the drainage of surface water from the Nar Ouse Regeneration Area, the channel below the bridge on Wisbech Road has been enlarged. Part of Blubberhouse Creek has been re-excavated, to create a flood relief basin. Although it will not normally contain any water, in storm conditions where high water levels in the Ouse prevent the discharge of water from the Nar, the basin may be filled to a depth of up to 2.6 feet (0.79 m), and will drain back into the river once tide levels fall, normally after 5 to 6 hours. This work was completed in April 2011.

== Mills ==
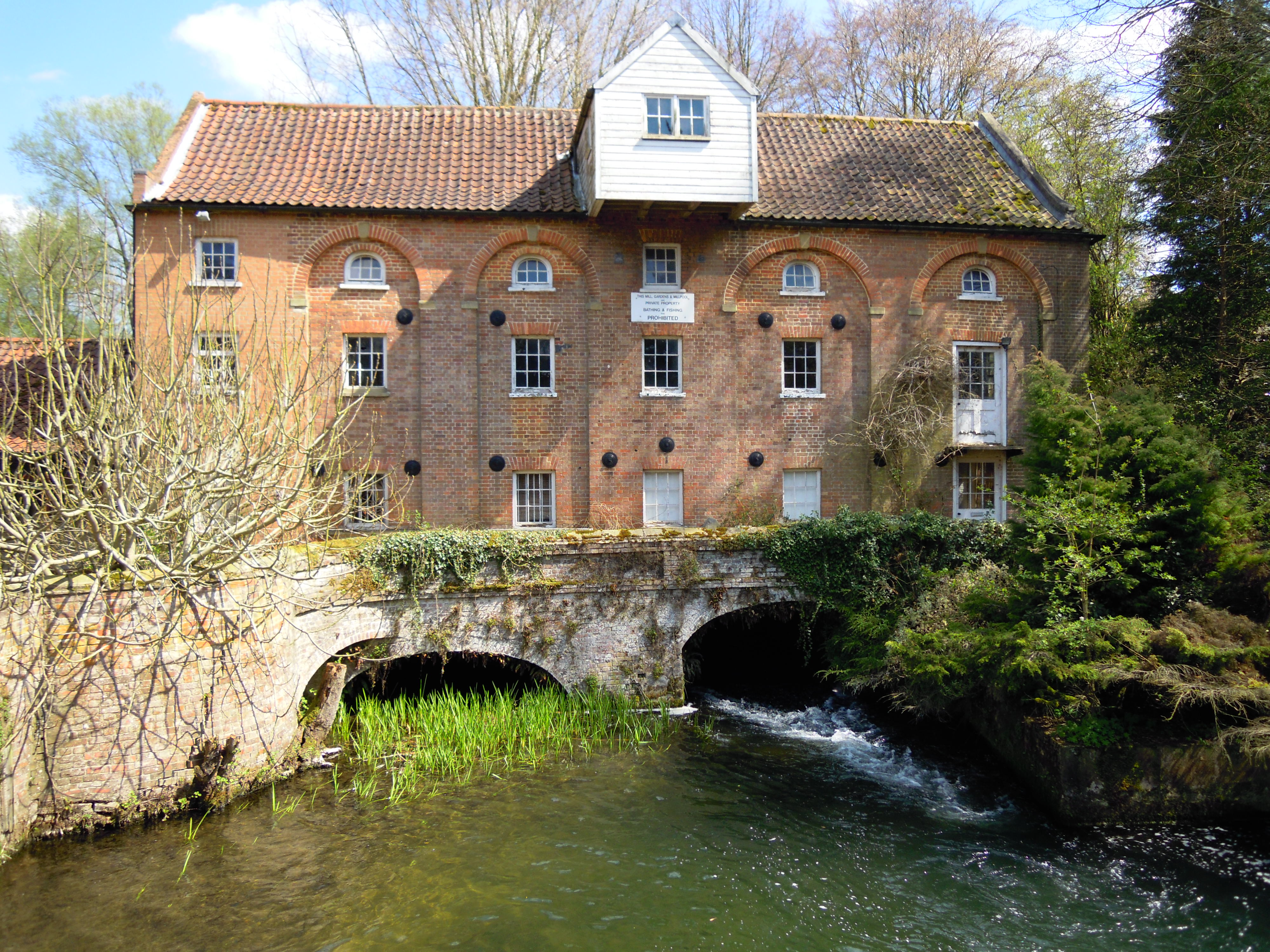
Narborough Water Mill was renovated in 1980.

The river has provided the power for several mills over many centuries. Working downstream from the source, the first mill was at Newton by Castle Acre. The site was mentioned in the Domesday Book. The present mill was built in brick with a pantiled roof, and a mill house, built with stone from a ruined priory, was attached. The mill was then enlarged, resulting in it having a different roof line to the house. It was used for kibbling corn in the 1930s. By 1972, when the mill was restored, the mill house was just a shell with no roof, and it had been demolished by 1977. A new mill house was built in the 1990s by a Norfolk historian, in a similar style to the original. Most of the machinery, including the wheel, were still in place in 2003, although not operational.

West Acre mill was a four-storey building, with a brick-built ground floor and the upper storeys built in weatherboarded timber. It had a pantiled roof, with a mill house attached. The ground floor of the mill dated from the 15th century, and appeared to be built from material obtained from West Acre Abbey. The water wheel drove four pairs of grinding stones, although only two were used in later years. The four-level stone driving frame, which allowed all four wheels to be operated at once, was noted as an outstanding example of milling machinery in the 1950s, when the building was surveyed, but it was demolished in 1959, as it was deemed to be unsafe. The mill house remains.

Narborough Mill was a large three-storey building built in 1780. Charles Tyssen added an extension in 1845, but failed to provide adequate foundations, and the addition gradually sank until the roof collapsed in 1980. In 1887, there was an engine house on the front of the mill, but this then became a house for the miller. After the collapse of the extension, thirteen 50-foot (15 m) piles were used to stabilise the rest of the building before restoration began. A 14-foot (4.3 m) water wheel drove a horizontal shaft, which powered four sets of millstones, later extended to six. Although the mill ceased to operate in the early 1950s, most of the machinery remains intact.

Narborough Bone Mill was further downstream, and did not have any road access, as bones were delivered by boat, and the ground bonemeal was taken away by boat. It was built in the early nineteenth century, and was used to grind bones from local slaughterhouses, whalebones from the King's Lynn whaling industry, and bones from cemeteries in Hamburg. The mill ceased to work in 1884 or soon afterwards, when the Nar Valley Drainage Board built a sluice near the mouth of the river, preventing use of the river by boats. Despite this, the wheel remains as a prominent feature on the bank opposite the towpath.

The final mill was at Pentney, and it was originally owned by the nearby priory. After the demise of the priory, the village gradually moved towards Narborough, leaving the mill isolated, and it ceased to be used in the 19th century. The remains show that it was built of white brick, and trade directories from the 19th century show that it was used as a pub once it ceased to be a mill.

== Water quality ==
The Environment Agency measure the water quality of the river systems in England. Each is given an overall ecological status, which may be one of five levels: high, good, moderate, poor and bad. There are several components that are used to determine this, including biological status, which looks at the quantity and varieties of invertebrates, angiosperms and fish. Chemical status, which compares the concentrations of various chemicals against known safe concentrations, is rated good or fail.

The water quality of the River Nar system was as follows in 2019.

Section	Ecological Status	Chemical Status	Length	Catchment	Channel
Nar upstream of Abbey Farm	Moderate	Fail	18.4 miles (29.6 km)	59.58 square miles (154.3 km^{2})	
Middleton Stop Drain	Moderate	Fail	6.9 miles (11.1 km)	13.63 square miles (35.3 km^{2})	heavily modified
Nar downstream of Abbey Farm	Moderate	Fail	9.5 miles (15.3 km)	5.19 square miles (13.4 km^{2})	heavily modified

The reasons for the quality being less than good include physical modification of the channels, and in the case of Middleton Stop Drain, naturally occurring nickel and its compounds. Like most rivers in the UK, the chemical status changed from good to fail in 2019, due to the presence of polybrominated diphenyl ethers (PBDE) and mercury compounds, neither of which had previously been included in the assessment.

== Points of interest ==
Point	Coordinates (Links to map resources)	OS Grid Ref	Notes
Modern entrance sluice	52.7475°N 0.3957°E	TF618193	
1884 tidal sluice	52.7384°N 0.3998°E	TF621183	
Setchey Bridge	52.6941°N 0.4196°E	TF636134	
Former junction with Little River	52.6933°N 0.4363°E	TF647134	
High Bridge	52.6937°N 0.4693°E	TF669135	Floodgate just upstream
Floodgate and sluice	52.6920°N 0.4783°E	TF675133	
Sluice	52.6837°N 0.4962°E	TF688124	
Sluice	52.6802°N 0.5094°E	TF697121	Pentney Mill just upstream
Sluice	52.6779°N 0.5345°E	TF714119	
Marham gauging station	52.6781°N 0.5479°E	TF723119	
Sluice	52.6803°N 0.5525°E	TF726122	
Narborough Bone Mill	52.6830°N 0.5608°E	TF731125	? sluice just downstream
Sluice	52.6879°N 0.5733°E	TF740131	
Sluice below Narborough Wharf	52.6885°N 0.5800°E	TF744132	
A47 Bridge (pen sluice below)	52.6929°N 0.5886°E	TF750137	
West Acre bridge	52.7013°N 0.6319°E	TF779147	River wider
Castle Acre bridge	52.7006°N 0.6909°E	TF819148	
Lexham Hall and Broad Water	52.7174°N 0.7642°E	TF867168	
Source near Tittleshall	52.7502°N 0.7913°E	TF884206	

The locations of sluices are taken from the 1884/85 Ordnance Survey 1:2500 map. There is no indication of any navigation structures, including Edwards' pen lock, above Narborough Wharf on those maps.

== Bibliography ==
- Babtie; Brown; Root (2003). "Nar Ouse Navigation Stage 2 Report" (PDF). West Norfolk Council. Archived from the original (PDF) on 3 April 2012.
- Blair, Andrew Hunter (2006). The River Great Ouse and tributaries. Imray Laurie Norie and Wilson. ISBN 978-0-85288-943-5.
- Boyes, John; Russell, Ronald (1977). The Canals of Eastern England. David and Charles. ISBN 978-0-7153-7415-3.
- CAMS (March 2005). "The North West Norfolk Catchment Abstraction Management Strategy" (PDF). Environment Agency. Archived from the original (PDF) on 25 April 2012.
- Chambers, John, ed. (1829). A General History of the County of Norfolk. John Stacy.
- Cumberlidge, Jane (2009). Inland Waterways of Great Britain (8th Ed.). Imray Laurie Norie and Wilson. ISBN 978-1-84623-010-3.
- Holloway, James; Fisher, Karen (2011). "River Nar SSSI Restoration Strategy and Plan" (PDF). River Restoration Centre. Archived (PDF) from the original on 4 March 2016.
- Marsh, Terry; Hannaford, Jamie (2008). UK Hydrometric Register (PDF). Natural Environment Research Council. ISBN 978-0-9557672-2-7. Archived from the original (PDF) on 31 October 2014.
- Roberts, Gary (2008). "Puny Drain Diversion (presentation at Catchment 08 Conference)" (PDF). Association of Drainage Authorities. Archived from the original (PDF) on 31 May 2013.
- Rye, James (1991). A Popular Guide to Norfolk Place Names. Larks Press. ISBN 0-948400-15-3.
- Towler, P (9 October 2018). "East of Ouse Policy Statement". East of Ouse, Polver and Nar IDB. Archived from the original on 30 December 2020.
