= Weld (name) =

Weld is a surname of Anglo-Saxon English and Dutch origin.

== Notable people ==
- Weld family, an extended English family going back to the 11th century
- Alfred Weld (1823-1890), leading English Jesuit and astronomer, grandson of Thomas Weld of Lulworth
- Cecil Weld-Forester, 1st Baron Forester (1767-1823), Anglican, Member of Parliament, added Weld name for inheritance
- Cecil Weld-Forester, 5th Baron Forester (1843-1917), Conservative peer and Member of Parliament, son of Orlando
- Charles Richard Weld (1813-1869), English writer and historian, son of Isaac
- Charles Joseph Weld (1893-1962), officer in the British Indian Army in both World wars
- Dermot Weld (born 1949), Irish veterinarian and racehorse trainer
- Edward Weld (1705-1761), son of Humphrey Weld, sued at the Arches Court by his first wife, countersued and won
- Eadric the Wild (active 1068-70), nephew of the Duke of Mercia, Norman Conquest resister and presumed ancestor of Welds
- Edward Weld (1741-1775), English recusant landowner and first husband of Maria Fitzherbert
- Sir Frederick Weld (1823–1891), Prime minister of New Zealand, grandson of Thomas Weld of Lulworth
- George Weld-Forester, 3rd Baron Forester (1807-1886), Father of the House of Commons and Peer
- Harry Weld-Forester (born 1981), Scottish cricketer
- Henry Joseph Weld-Blundell (1848-1901), Australian politician
- Herbert Weld Blundell (1852 – 1935), English traveller in Africa, archaeologist, philanthropist and yachtsman
- Sir Humphrey Weld (c.1550-1610), member of the Worshipful Company of Grocers, Lord Mayor of London
- Humphrey Weld (of Lulworth) (1612–1685) MP, purchaser of Lulworth estate, son of Sir John of Arnold's Court
- Isaac Weld (1774–1856), Irish explorer and artist
- Sir John Weld (1582–1622), of Arnold's Court, Edmonton, Middlesex, son of the Lord Mayor founded the Weld Chapel
- Sir John Weld (1613–1681), member of Parliament in 1679
- Sir John Weld (1615-1674), of Compton Bassett
- John Welde (1642), of Willye, High Sheriff of Shropshire
- John Weld-Forester, 2nd Baron Forester (1801-1877) Tory politician
- Joseph Weld (yachtsman) (1777-1863), recusant third son of Thomas Weld of Lulworth, competitive yachtsman
- Sir Joseph William Weld (1909-1992), army officer, landowner and Lord Lieutenant of Dorset
- Maria Weld (1756-1837), second wife of Edward Weld of Lulworth, better known as Mrs Fitzherbert
- Orlando Weld-Forester, 4th Baron Forester (1813-1894), British Peer and Anglican clergyman
- Thomas Welde (1595-1661), temporary Puritan emigrant from Essex to New England
- Thomas Weld (of Lulworth) (1750-1810), recusant landowner of Lulworth and philanthropist, father of fifteen children
- Thomas Weld (cardinal) (1773–1837), eldest son of Thomas Weld of Lulworth, English Roman Catholic cardinal
- Thomas Weld Blundell (1808-1883), landowner grandson of Thomas Weld of Lulworth, added Blundell name for inheritance
- Wilfrid Weld (1934-2015), landowner and restorer of Lulworth Castle
- William Weld (1649–1698), son of Sir John of Compton Basset, landowner

- Weld family, an extended family of New England
  - Charles Goddard Weld, 1857–1911, physician and philanthropist
  - Daniel S. Weld, computer scientist
  - Ezra Greenleaf Weld, 1801–1874, a photographer
  - Francis Weld Peabody, 1881-1927, American physician and Harvard Medical School teacher
  - George Walker Weld, 1840–1905, philanthropist, athlete
  - Greg Weld, race car driver and manufacturer
  - Isabel Weld Perkins, 1876–1948
  - John Weld Peck (1874 – 1937), a United States District Judge for Ohio
  - John Weld (writer) (1905 - 2003), newspaper reporter in New York
  - Philip Saltonstall Weld, 1915–1984, newspaper publisher and yacht racer
  - Seth L. Weld, Philippine–American War Medal of Honor recipient
  - Stephen Minot Weld, 1806–1867, schoolmaster, investor, and politician
  - Stephen Minot Weld, Jr., 1842–1920, horticulturist and Army officer
  - Susan Roosevelt Weld, wife of William Weld
  - Theodore Dwight Weld, 1803–1895, an abolitionist
  - Theresa Weld Blanchard (1893–1978), a figure skater
  - Tuesday Weld, 1943–, an actress
  - William Weld, former Governor of Massachusetts
  - William Gordon Weld, 1775–1825, ship owner
  - William Fletcher Weld, 1800–1881, ship owner
