= Charles Weld =

Charles Weld may refer to:

- Charles Goddard Weld (1857–1911), Boston-area physician, sailor, philanthropist and art lover
- Charles Joseph Weld (1893–1962), officer in the British Indian Army
- Charles Richard Weld (1813–1869), English writer, known as a historian of the Royal Society
