= William Weld (disambiguation) =

Bill Weld (born 1945) is an American politician.

William Weld may also refer to:

- William Gordon Weld (1775–1825), American shipmaster
- William Fletcher Weld (1800–1881), American shipping magnate
