= Anderson Bridge =

Anderson Bridge can refer to:

- Anderson Bridge (Singapore), Singapore River, Singapore
- Anderson Memorial Bridge, Charles River, Massachusetts, United States
- Charles Anderson Memorial Bridge, Pennsylvania, United States
- Anderson Street Bridge (Hackensack River), New Jersey, United States
- Forrest H. Anderson Memorial Bridge, Missouri River in Craig, Montana, United States
- Anderston bridge, a footbridge in Glasgow, Scotland.
- Anderson Bridge massacre, 1950 in Pakistan
- Anderson Bridge (New Brunswick), Canada
