= Weld family =

Ancient English lineage

Weld
- Political family
- Coat of arms granted to Joseph Weld
- Place of origin: Cheshire, England
- Titles: Sheriff of London; Governor of Massachusetts

The Weld family is an ancient English family, and their possible relations in New England, an extended family of Boston Brahmins. An early record of a Weld holding public office is the High Sheriff of London in 1352, William. In the 16th and 17th centuries people called Weld and living in Cheshire began to travel and to settle in the environs of London, in Shropshire, in Suffolk and thence in the American Colonies, and in Dorset. While most of the Welds of England had adopted Protestantism, the exception was all three sons of Sir John Weld of Edmonton, who married into elite recusant families, thus reverting, with their descendants, to Roman Catholicism. The noted Catholic Weld lineage, unbroken till the new millennium, is that of Lulworth Castle in Dorset.

== London Welds ==
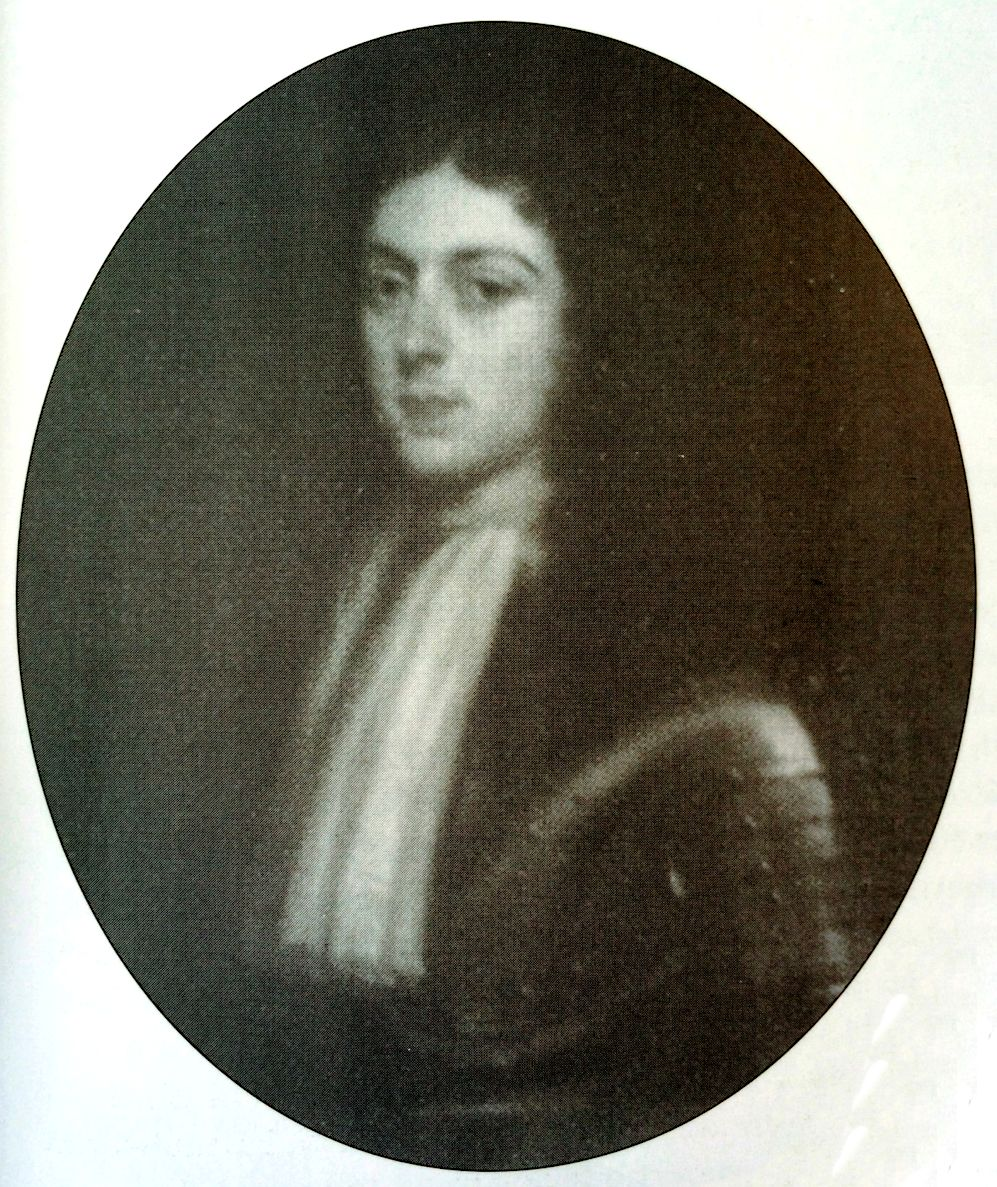
Sir John Weld (1585–1622) of Arnolds, Southgate, London

The Welds are an old gentry family which claims descent from Eadric the Wild and are related to other Weld branches in several parts of the United Kingdom, from Willey, Shropshire, and the Lulworth Estate, Dorset and still others in the Antipodes and in Massachusetts. A notable early Weld was William de Welde (or atte Welde), High Sheriff of London in 1352, whose progeny moved in and out of obscurity.

In mid 16th century, a cadet line originating from John Weld of Eaton, Cheshire and his wife Joanna FitzHugh of Congleton Cheshire descends from his fourth and youngest son, Sir Humphrey Weld (died 1610). Weld settled in Holdwell, Hertfordshire and became a City of London merchant and a member of the Worshipful Company of Grocers. On 9 May 1598, he was elected an alderman of the City of London for Farringdon Within ward. He was Sheriff of London from 1599 to 1600. He was knighted on 26 July 1603. He transferred as alderman to Walbrook ward in 1604. In 1608, he was elected Lord Mayor of London. During his mayoralty the reconstruction of the Aldgate, one of the four principal gates of the City of London, was completed. Weld's name as Mayor appeared on the gate itself, and in connection with an engraving of the gate produced later. He was president of Christ's Hospital from 1609. Of his seven surviving children born by his first wife, Ann Wheler, two were sons. His second wife and widow was Dame Mary. The elder of Humphrey's sons being Sir John Weld (1585–1622) of Arnolds in Southgate, Middlesex. A merchant, and a charter member and Council assistant of the Newfoundland Company of 1610, he founded the Weld Chapel in Edmonton, London. He married Frances daughter of William Whitmore of London (and sister of Sir William Whitmore), he was knighted in 1617, died in 1622, and was buried in his private chapel at Arnolds. His younger brother, Humphrey died without issue.

Sir John's sons married into prominent Catholic families and became recusants. The children of Sir John Weld and Dame Frances (née Whitmore) are shown as follows by Burke:

- Thomas Weld, died young

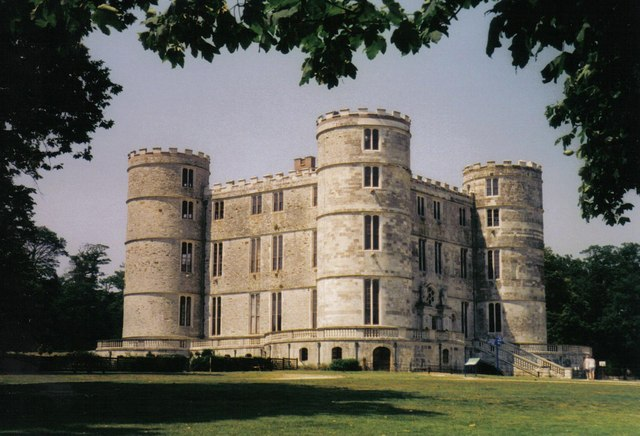
Lulworth Castle, Dorset bought by Humphrey Weld in 1641, pictured in 1999

- Humphrey Weld (22 January 1612 – 1685), 2nd son, the heir, married (1639) Clare (died 1691), daughter of Thomas Arundell, 1st Baron Arundell of Wardour. Weld graduated in law from Trinity College, Cambridge, in 1629 and was admitted to the Inner Temple in 1631. Between 1633 and 1636 he went on a Grand Tour of Europe. He was Deputy Lieutenant of Dorset, a Justice of the peace, a member of the Royal household, public official, landowner and property administrator who was elected to the House of Commons for Christchurch in Hampshire in 1661. Weld was a crypto-recusant who kept his religious allegiance secret in order to stay in public office during a turbulent political period in English history. He was appointed Cup-bearer to the Catholic Queen Henrietta Maria 1639–44 and later as Gentleman of the Privy Chamber 1668–85 under her son, Charles II. He served as a magistrate and in numerous other public roles in London, Middlesex, Cambridgeshire, Hampshire and in Dorset, where he was governor of Portland Castle. He acquired "Weld House" in London. In 1641 Humphrey bought the huge Lulworth Estate in Dorset, with financial help from his brothers, and began the Lulworth line of Welds which has continued for over 350 years.
- (Sir) John Weld (died 1674), of Compton Bassett, Wiltshire, married (1648) Mary, daughter of William Stourton, 11th Baron Stourton, of Stourhead, and had a son:
  - William Weld, who succeeded to his uncle Humphrey (the crypto Catholic)
- George Weld (died 1696), married Bridget Thimblethorp of Lincolnshire, and had daughters Cicely and Elizabeth
- Anne Weld, married Sir John Cutts of Childerley
- Mary Weld, married Thomas Allen, Esq. of Finchley
- Frances Weld, married ----- Martin, Esq. of Buckinghamshire
- Margaret Weld, married (1634) William Bowyer, Esq. of Denham Court, Buckinghamshire
- Dorothy Weld

== The Welds of Lulworth ==
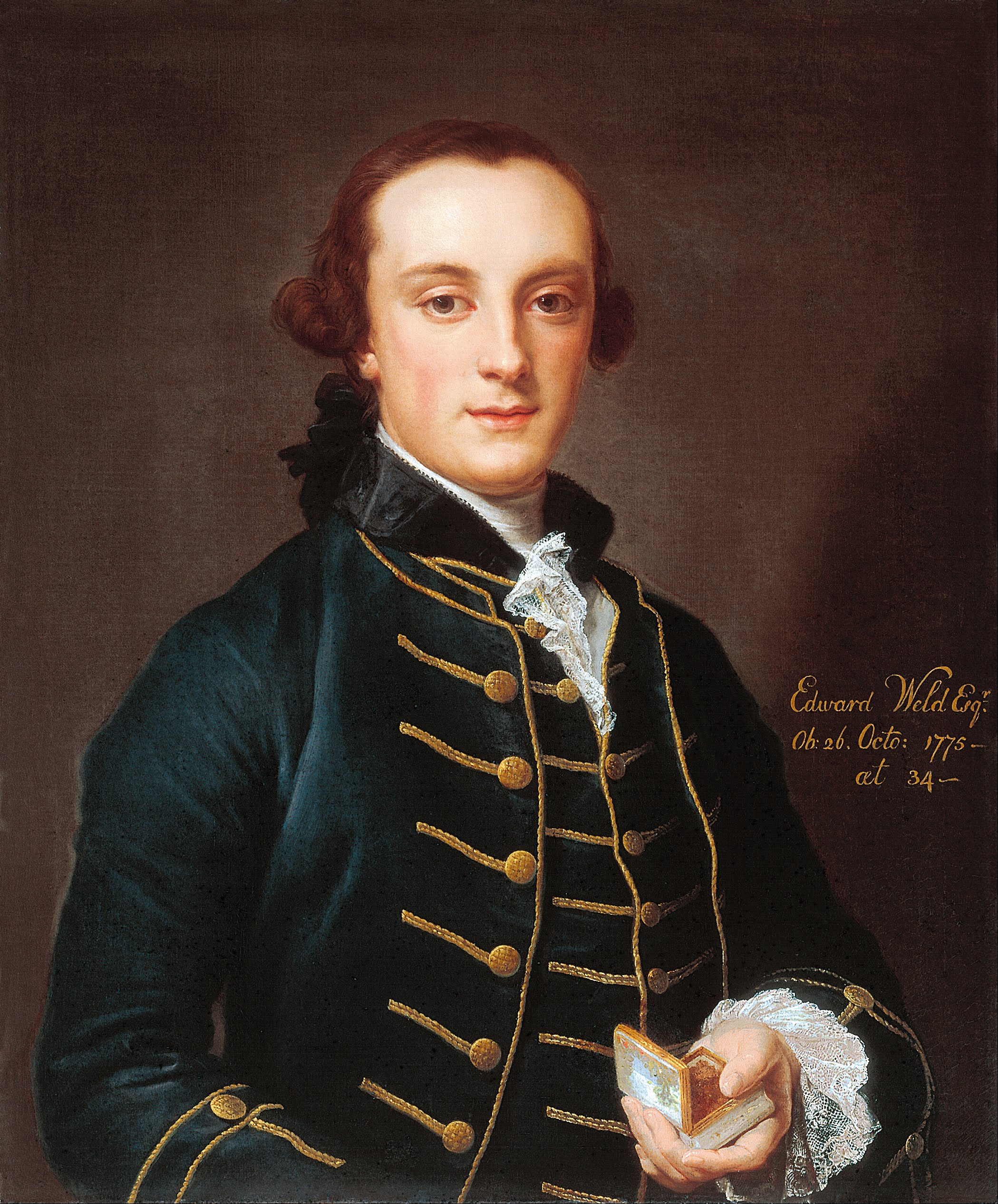
Edward Weld (1741–1775) by Pompeo Batoni

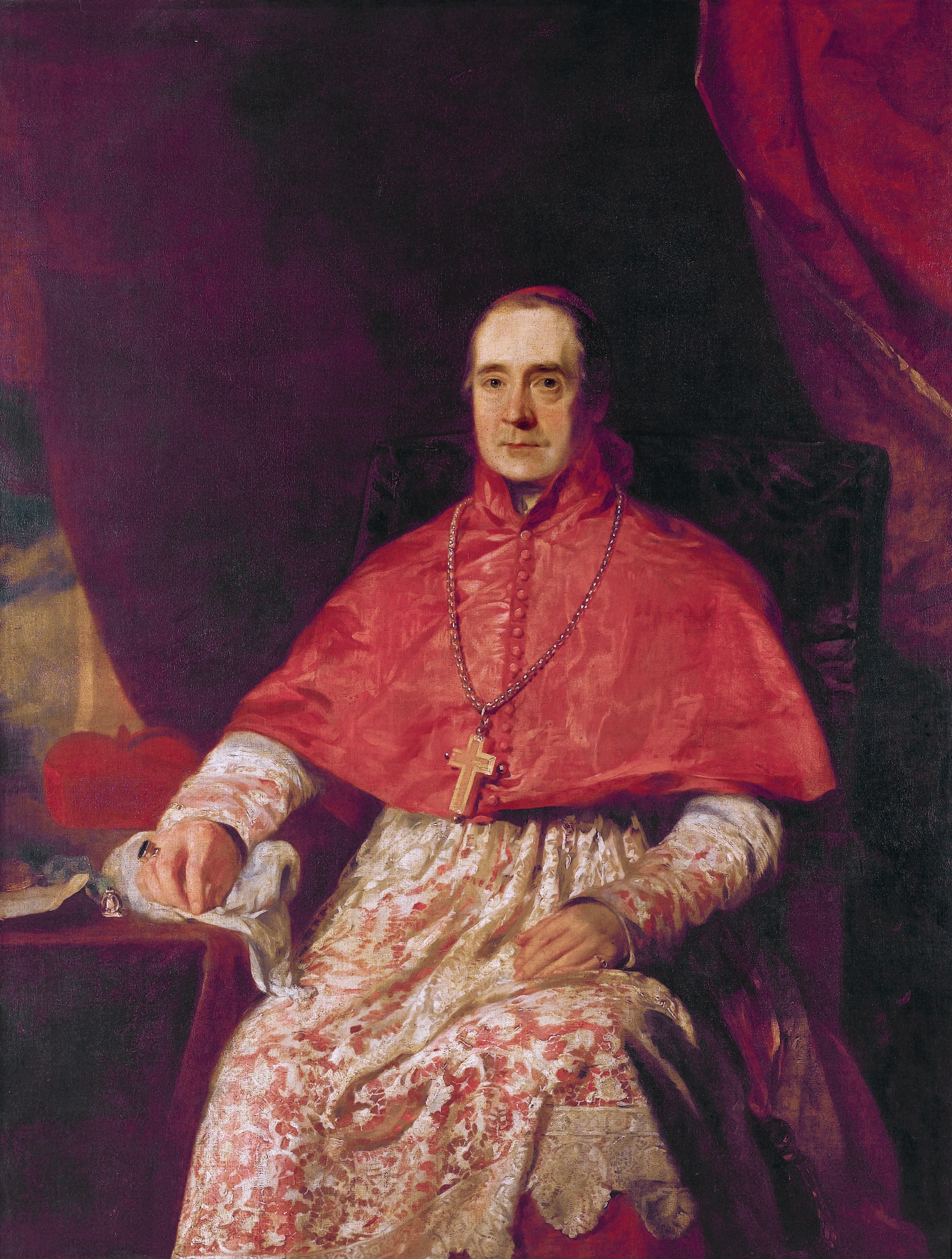
Cardinal Thomas Weld (1773–1837), by Andrew Geddes

Edward Weld was the third and first surviving son of Humphrey Weld (died 1722) of Lulworth, son of William Weld, and the grandnephew of Humphrey Weld MP, (purchaser in 1641 of the vast Lulworth Estate, who had died without a male heir), and of his wife Margaret Simeons, daughter of Sir James Simeons of Chilworth nr. Oxford. Weld succeeded his father in 1722. On coming of age he was the fourth generation of Welds to take charge of the vast estate with its portion of the magnificent Jurassic Coast (today a UNESCO World Heritage Site). With the financial help of his mother's family, he developed the castle and its grounds. He was succeeded by his eldest son and heir, Edward Weld (1740–1775), briefly the first husband of Maria Fitzherbert, before being fatally injured in a riding accident. The next proprietor of Lulworth was Edward's youngest brother:

- Thomas (1750–1810), distinguished as a bibliophile, philanthropist and personal friend of king George III. He greatly facilitated the return of Roman Catholic education to post-reformation England. He endowed Stonyhurst College and Stonyhurst Saint Mary's Hall.

He was also the patriarch of a dynasty which carries on into the new millennium. Thomas Weld and his wife, Mary Massey-Stanley, had fifteen children:

- Thomas, b. 1773, married Lucy Clifford, 1796, had issue. Widowed, became a priest and cardinal of the Roman Catholic church
- Juliana, b. 1774 died unmarried
- Edward, b. 1775 (died young)
- Joseph, b. 1777, married Charlotte Mary Stourton, 1802, had issue. He succeeded his brother Thomas to the Lulworth Castle and estates, and is remembered as one of the first to build and handle fast-sailing yachts. His best known boat was The Arrow, which took part in the first America's Cup race in 1851 under the ownership of Thomas Chamberlayne. Joseph was also founder of the Isle of Wight based Royal Yacht Squadron.
- Catherine Winifred, b.1776, married William Stourton, 18th Baron Stourton, had issue
- John, b. 1780 became a Jesuit priest and rector of Stonyhurst
- William, b. 1781 (died young)
- Humphrey, b. 1783, married Christiana-Maria Clifford, had issue
- Mary Theresa, b. 1784, became a nun of the Order of the Visitation of Holy Mary
- James, b. 1785, married Juliana-Anne Petre, had issue.
- George, b. 1786, married Maria Searle, had issue
- Francis, b. 1787, (died young)
- Clare, b. 1788?, became a nun of the Order of the Visitation of Holy Mary
- Elizabeth Mary, b.1789? married Charles Thomas Bodenham de la Barre of Rotherwas, Herefordshire, had issue
- Theresa, b. 1792? married William Vaughan of Courtfield, Monmouthshire

=== Descendants ===
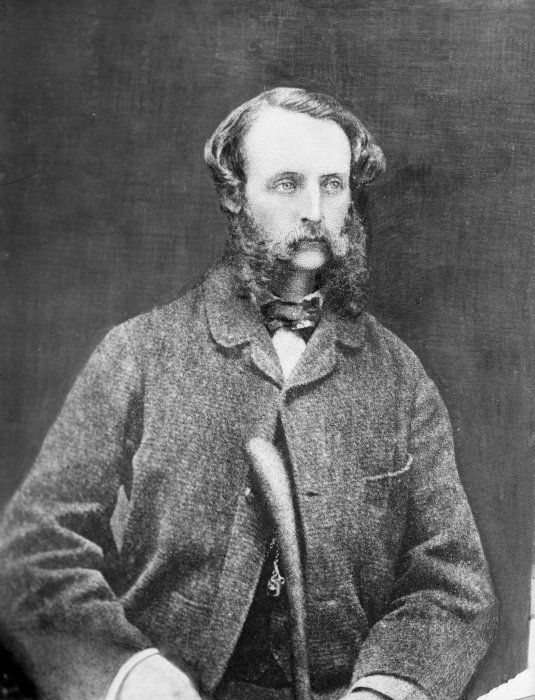
Sir Frederick Weld, c.1865, premier of New Zealand

- Thomas Weld (1808–1887) heir to Lulworth, took on the name Blundell to inherit the Ince Blundell estate.
- Charles Weld, eldest son of Humphrey Weld of Chideock, was a noted artist, who made copies of pictures of the English martyrs, the originals of which are now missing.
- Henry Thomas Weld (1816–1893), eldest son of James and Julianna Weld, emigrated to Maryland in 1838 and became a director of the Maryland and New York Coal and Iron Company. He married Harriet Hoffman Tilghman, daughter of Capt. Philemon Tilghman RN and a relation of William Tilghman.
- Sir Frederick Weld (1823–1891), another son of Humphrey Weld of Chideock, Prime Minister of New Zealand and Governor of Western Australia, appointed GCMG.
- Mgr Francis Weld (died 1898), son of James Weld, was an author.
- Alfred Weld (1823–1890), son of Mary, née Searle, and George Weld, was a leading English Jesuit and astronomer. He was a senior administrator of the Society of Jesus and an editor and author. During his time as master of novices at Roehampton, in 1868 Weld welcomed the poet Gerard Manley Hopkins into the Society.
- Henry Joseph Weld-Blundell (1848–1901), Australian politician, member of the Queensland Legislative Assembly.
- Herbert Weld Blundell (1852–1935), English traveller in Africa, archaeologist, philanthropist and yachtsman. In 1924, he dropped the use of the suffix Blundell. During his tenure the castle's interior was gutted by fire on 29 August 1929. Some priceless items were able to be saved thanks to the help of a Girl Guides camp present in the castle grounds.
- Colonel Sir Joseph William Weld, OBE, TD (1909–1992), Lord Lieutenant of Dorset, was directly descended from Sir Humphrey Weld (died 1610). He became owner of the Lulworth Estate and Lulworth Castle in 1935 upon the death of his cousin, Herbert Weld

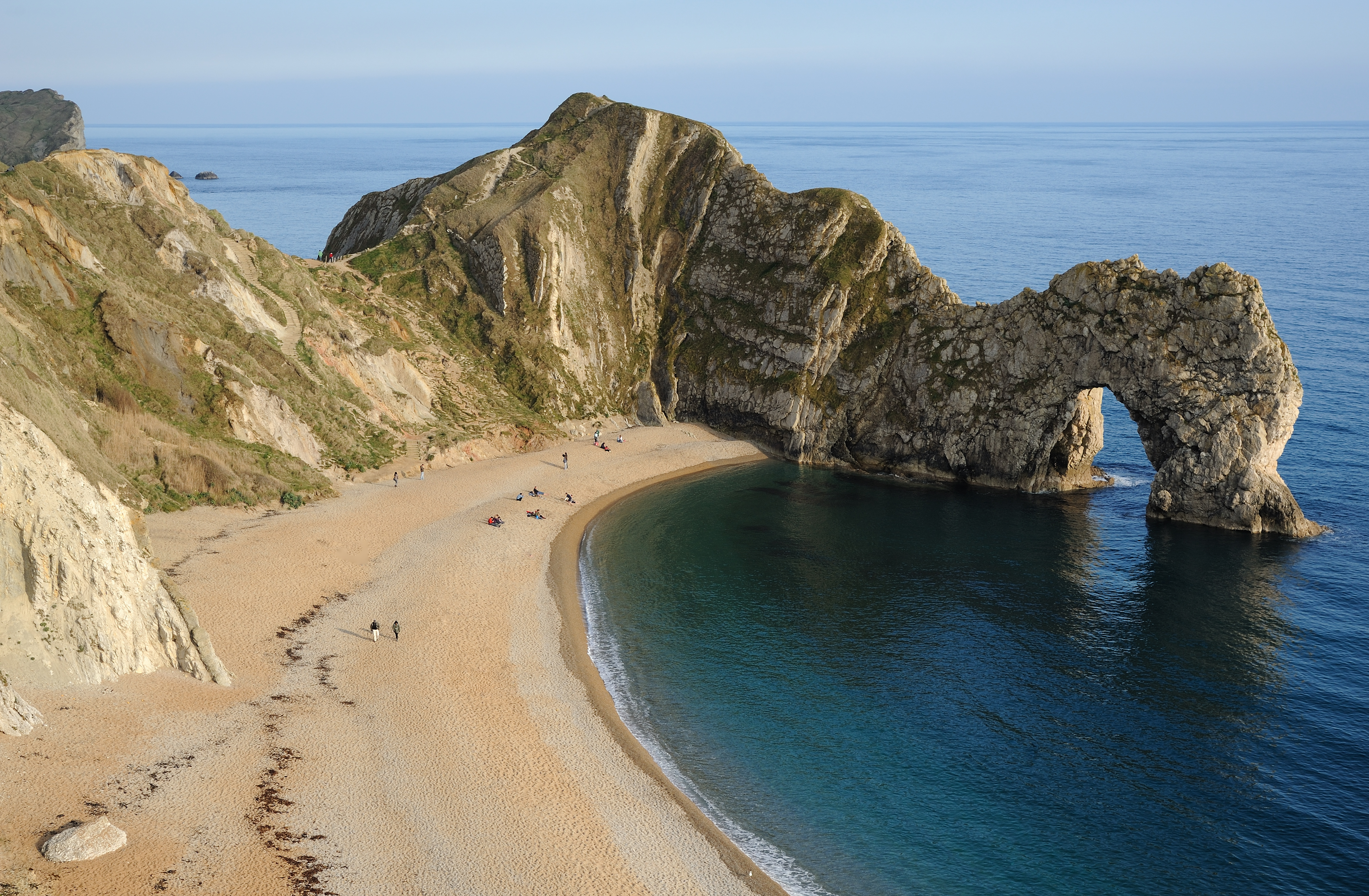
Durdle Door, Dorset

- Wilfrid Weld (1934–2015), Deputy Lieutenant of Dorset and restorer of Lulworth:
  “Wilfrid Weld led the transformation of the Lulworth Estate from a traditional landed estate, into a modern and self-supporting business powered by tourism and agriculture. Under his leadership he restored the great Lulworth Castle and established Lulworth Cove and Durdle Door as iconic, internationally-renowned landmarks.”

== Willey Welds ==
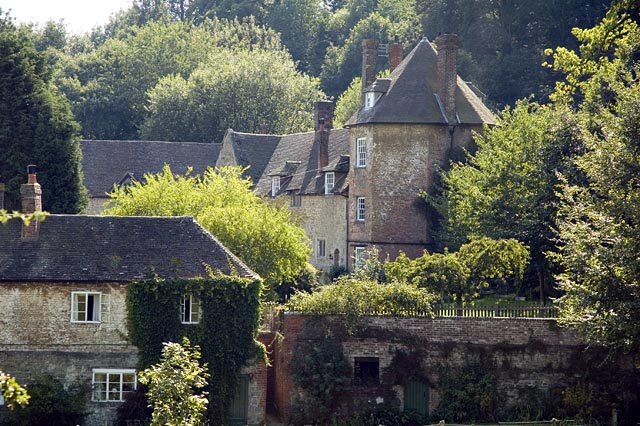
Willey Old Hall, Willey, Shropshire

John Weld, second son of John Weld of Eaton Hall, Cheshire and his wife Joanna FitzHugh, settled in Shropshire and became patriarch of the Willey Welds. (His youngest brother was Sir Humphrey Weld (died 1610), Lord Mayor of London). The Welds of Shropshire were several times connected by marriage with the Whitmores of Apley Hall, Staffordshire. His son, John Weld, Esquire (1582–1666), and first cousin of Sir John Weld of Edmonton, served as Town Clerk of London 1613–1642, and had bought the manor of Willey, Shropshire in 1617–1618 (where he was a neighbour of the Slaneys of Barrow and of the Whitmores of Apley), and was knighted in 1642. He married Elizabeth, eldest daughter of Sir William Romney (died 1611), Alderman of London, at St Martin Pomary on 4 February 1610/11. His sister Joan wife of Humphrey Slaney was buried there on 3 February 1630. His other sister Dorothy married Sir William Whitmore (died 1648) of Apley, Shropshire, brother of Sir George Whitmore (alderman and Lord Mayor of London) and of Frances Whitmore the wife of Sir John Weld of Edmonton. He was the father of Sir John Weld (died 1681) of Willey,

=== MPs for Much Wenlock ===
The Welds returned several Members of Parliament for Much Wenlock where they had industrial interests, starting with George Weld, briefly replaced by his father, Sir John Weld (died 1681) and again George Weld (died 1701). They were second cousins of Humphrey Weld (of Lulworth) (1612–1685) MP for Christchurch. George Weld's successor was his son, George Weld the younger (1674–1748), another Wenlock MP. He was succeeded by his daughter, Elizabeth, who married Brooke Forester, a further Wenlock MP. Their son, George Forester succeeded to Willey and to the parliamentary seat for Much Wenlock. He died childless and left his estate to a cousin, Cecil Forester and thus the Weld blood line became extinguished in Shropshire. However, the Weld name continued by royal licence granted to Forester in 1811 as a condition of the inheritance of the Willey estate. Having been elected MP for Much Wenlock in 1790, a seat he held till 1820, he was subsequently raised to the Peerage of the United Kingdom as Baron Weld-Forester, of Willey Park in the County of Shropshire. Very distantly related to the Welds, the Weld-Foresters have continued into the new millennium.

== American Welds ==
=== Early colonists ===
Coat of Arms of Captain Joseph Weld

The Weld family has a presence in Massachusetts dating back to the early 17th century and their relationship to one another is clearly recorded. In the first days of the British colonization of the Americas, three sons of Edmund Weld (1559–1608) of Sudbury, Suffolk, England arrived in Boston. Daniel Weld (1585/1586–1666), the eldest, became a teacher at Roxbury Latin School. Two notable Welds in New England traced their ancestry to him. Captain Joseph Weld (1599–1646), the youngest of the three Weld immigrants, is the ancestor from whom the more wealthy and famous Welds descend. As an award for his participation in the Pequot War of 1637 and subsequent negotiations, the colonial legislature granted Weld 278 acres (1.13 km^{2}) in the town of Roxbury. Captain Weld's land is now much of present-day Jamaica Plain and Roslindale. With the wealth generated from this grant, Joseph Weld became one of the first donors to Harvard and a founder of the Ancient and Honorable Artillery Company of Massachusetts.

=== Connection with Harvard ===
Thomas Weld's involvement with Harvard was the beginning of almost 400 years of association between that institution and the Weld Family. The first Weld to attend ended his Harvard career in disgrace. John Weld (born in 1625) and a classmate stole money and gunpowder from two houses and were caught. Henry Dunster (Harvard's first president) personally whipped them and expelled them from the school. Weld returned to England and became a minister in Durham. Edmund Weld (1631–1668; son of Thomas), the first Weld to graduate from Harvard (class of 1650) left Massachusetts Bay Colony as well. He became a minister in Ireland.

At least eighteen more Weld family members have graduated from Harvard since then, and two prominent buildings at Harvard University are named for the family.

=== John Weld ===
Captain John Weld, son of Captain Joseph Weld, inherited his estate and served as an officer in King Philip's War of 1675. He built his home, Weld Hall, on what came to be called Weld Hill in Forest Hills (still marked by the presence of Weld Hill Street across the street from Forest Hills MBTA station).

The descendants of John Weld created Weld Farm near the Brookline border around what is now Hancock Village but was formerly Weld Golf Course. Other descendants of John Weld moved on to develop the valley of Sawmill Brook near Dedham as the Williams Farm. Part of the Weld properties in this area were sold in 1854 for the construction of what is now the VFW Parkway in West Roxbury. While the Weld's Brookline and Dedham properties were developed in the 17th and 18th centuries as agricultural lands, in the 19th and 20th centuries these became Weld-owned estates of great luxury.

=== William Gordon Weld ===
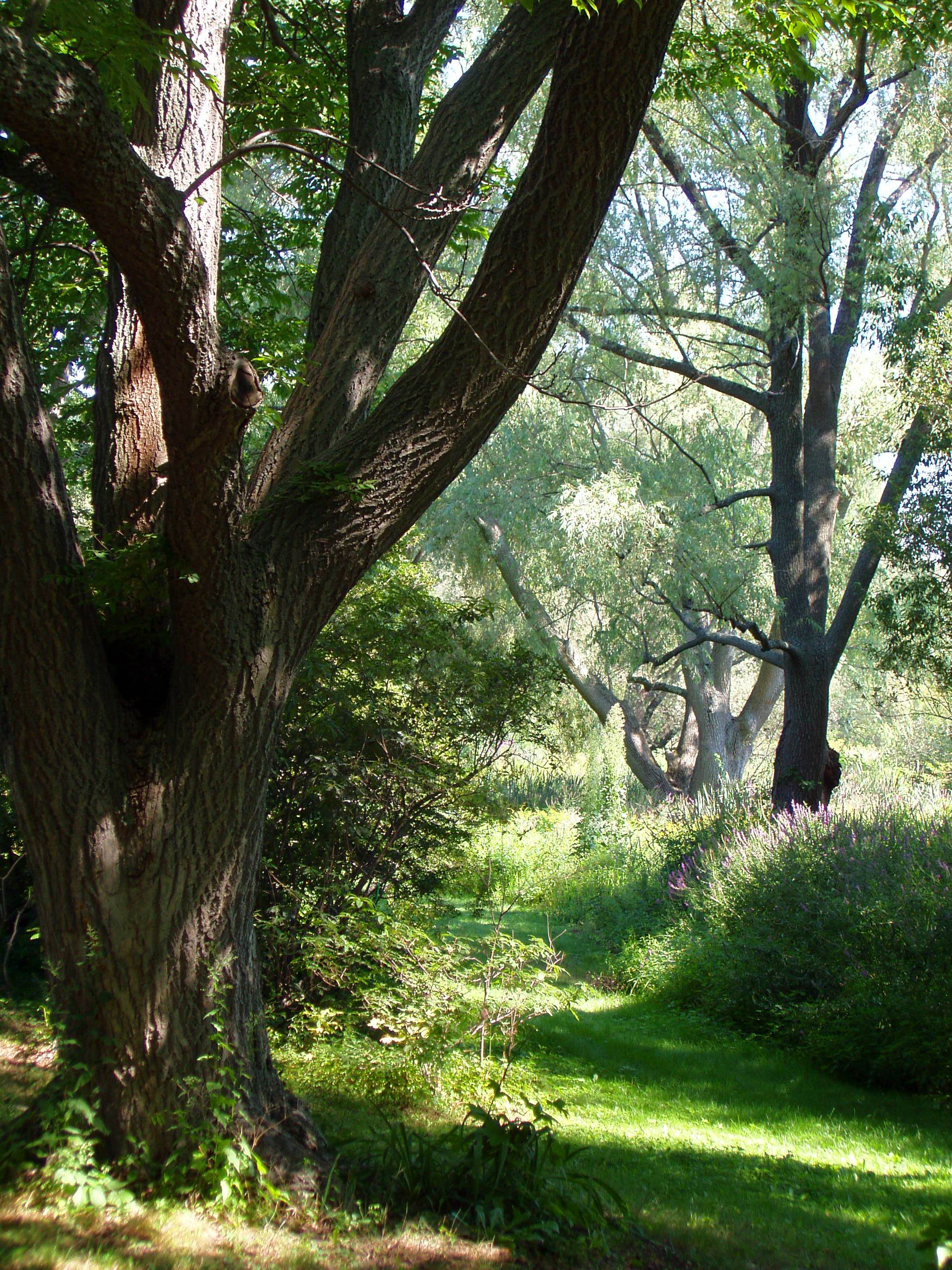
A scene in Arnold Arboretum

This first Weld Hall in Jamaica Plain was home to many generations of Welds, the last of which was Colonel Eleazer Weld, one of seven Weld family members who fought in the American Revolutionary War. Weld Hill was selected by George Washington as a rallying point for the patriot army to fall back upon in case of disaster. After Eleazer Weld's death in 1800, much of his land along the Roslindale and Jamaica Plain border went to fellow patriot Benjamin Bussey and was subsequently bequeathed to Harvard, becoming the basis for Arnold Arboretum. In Roslindale, the "Weld-Walter tract" remains the name of one of the four parcels into which the arboretum is divided. On the Walter Street side of the Arboretum near the intersection with Weld Street is a tiny cemetery with eight slate tombstones dated between 1712 and 1812. Two of the Welds who fought in the Revolutionary War are buried here, marked by a later monument of Roxbury puddingstone. William Gordon Weld (1775–1825), Eleazer's fifth son, founded a fleet of trading vessels that brought more wealth back from China. He married Hannah Minot (1780–1860) and together they had one daughter and eight sons. One son was killed in Mexico, but the remaining sons had 813 descendants.

==== Issue ====
- William Fletcher Weld (1800–1881), son of William Gordon Weld, expanded his father's maritime enterprise into a world-class collection of clipper ships known as the Black Horse Flag fleet. He also invested in railroads and urban real estate.
- Stephen Minot Weld (1806–1867), another son of William Gordon Weld, was a schoolmaster, real estate investor and politician. After his death, his elder brother (above) raised the Harvard dormitory known as Weld Hall in his honor.
- George Walker Weld (1840–1905), a son of William Fletcher Weld, was a founding member of Boston Athletic Association (organizers of today's Boston Marathon) and the financier of the Weld Boathouse, a landmark on the Charles.
- William Gordon Weld II, named for his grandfather, married a Goddard (a Massachusetts family represented by such members as Robert H. Goddard). He provided one record of his family's history in The Family of Weld (a manuscript at NEHGS).

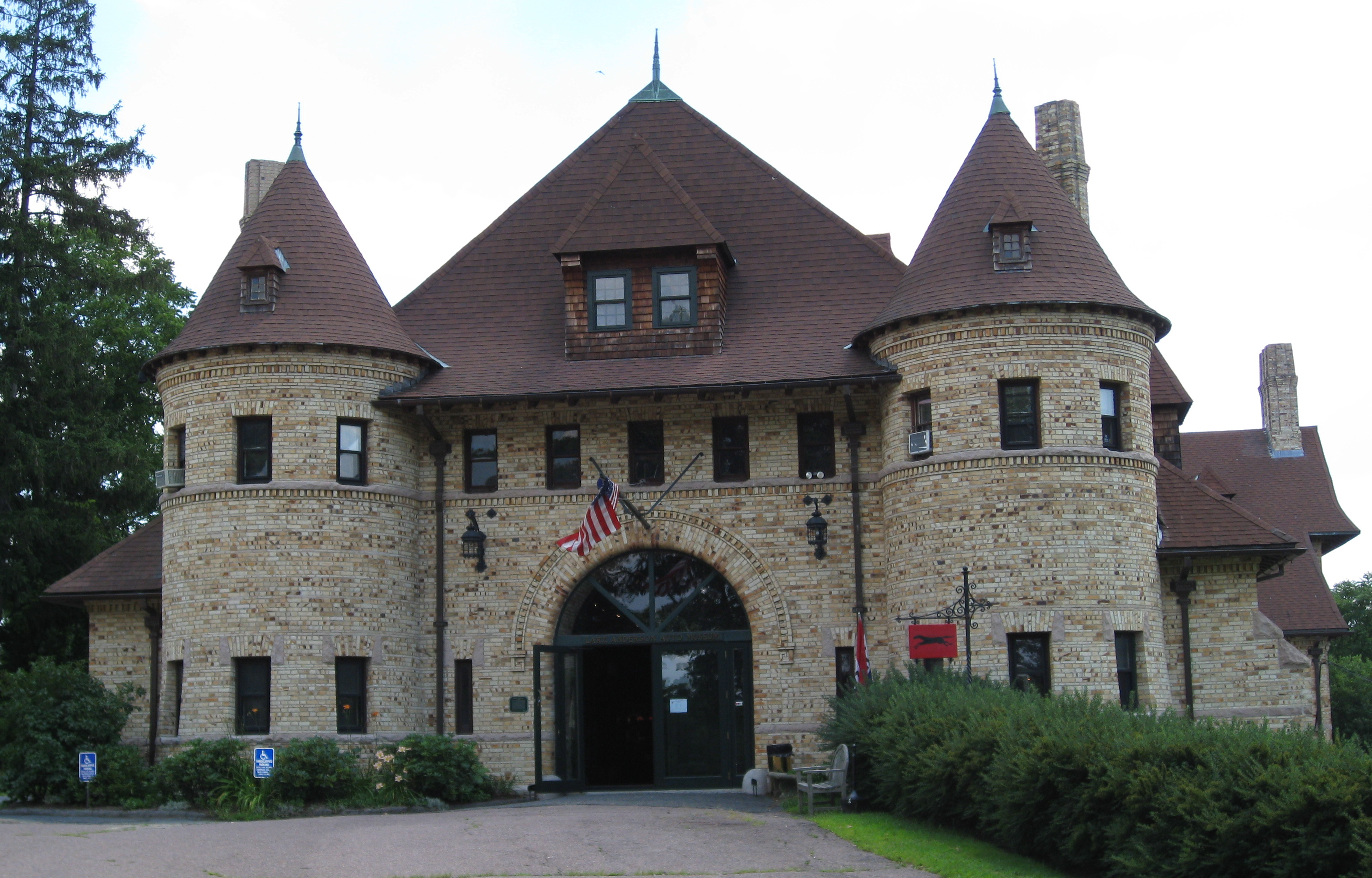
Larz Anderson Auto Museum in Brookline, Massachusetts

- Isabel Weld Perkins (1876–1948), daughter of Anna Minot Weld and Commodore George H. Perkins, was another grandchild of William Fletcher Weld and inherited $5.5 million of his wealth. She married diplomat Larz Anderson (later Ambassador to Japan) and became an author. Isabel bought Brookline land, including a house built on that land in 1883, from her cousin William Fletcher "Billy" Weld II and called the estate "Weld". Isabel Weld Perkins believed her Weld family and the Weld family of Lulworth Castle to be one and the same. Accordingly, she and Larz Anderson modified and expanded Billy Weld's original house to incorporate some architectural elements of Lulworth Castle in its design.
- Dr. Charles Goddard Weld (1857–1911), son of William Fletcher Weld II, was a physician and philanthropist. He purchased Japanese art belonging to friend Ernest Fenollosa and donated it the Boston Museum of Fine Arts. The MFA now has the largest collection of Japanese art outside Japan, much of it in the "Fenollosa-Weld Collection." Weld also purchased prints by premier American photographer Edward S. Curtis and donated those to Peabody Essex Museum.
- General Stephen Minot Weld Jr. (1842–1920), son of Stephen Minot Weld, served with distinction as a general during the American Civil War in such major conflicts, as the Second Battle of Bull Run, Antietam, and Gettysburg.
- Dr. Francis Minot Weld (1840–1894), yet another grandchild of William Gordon Weld, also served in the Civil War and then practiced medicine in Boston. One of Dr. Weld's sons, Christopher Minot Weld, was a renowned mining engineer.
- Francis Minot Weld Jr., another of Dr. Weld's sons, founded the investment bank White Weld & Co. in the early 20th century.
- William Floyd "Bill" Weld is the grandson of Francis Minot Weld Jr. After his grandfather's investment company was sold to the brokerage company G.H. Walker & Co. (named for George Herbert Walker Jr., uncle of President George H. W. Bush), the future governor served as director of the Bushes' company until it was bought by Merrill Lynch in the 1970s. Bill Weld's first wife, Susan Roosevelt Weld, Harvard professor specializing in Ancient China and later General Counsel to the Congressional-Executive Commission on China, is a great-granddaughter of Theodore Roosevelt. They have five children together. Weld's second and present wife, the writer and novelist Leslie Marshall, is a former daughter-in-law of Ben Bradlee of The Washington Post. Weld was the 2016 Libertarian Party nominee for Vice President of the United States and ran in the 2020 Republican Party presidential primaries, coming in second with 1 delegate.
- Lothrop Motley Weld II was named after his uncle, a son of Gen. Stephen Minot Weld Jr. who drowned as a boy on Cape Cod. Lothrop Weld graduated from Harvard, served in World War I, and worked for S.M. Weld & Company. He married four times and had five children. The oldest of these was Lothrop Motley Weld III. His youngest child, a daughter who grew up to be the most famous Weld in Hollywood, was only three years old when her father died.
- Susan Ker Weld, known by her stage name Tuesday Weld, is the daughter of Lothrop Motley Weld II and the great-granddaughter of Gen. Stephen Minot Weld Jr. Weld, an Academy Award-nominated actress, is perhaps best known for her role on The Many Loves of Dobie Gillis. She is a third cousin once removed to William Weld. Weld debuted in an Alfred Hitchcock film, co-starred with and dated Elvis Presley, and was married to Dudley Moore and Pinchas Zukerman during her career. She and former Governor Weld share William Gordon Weld as their common ancestor.
- Ezra Greenleaf Weld, another of Ludovicus Weld's sons, was an early American photographer who operated a daguerreotype studio in Cazenovia, New York.
- Lewis Ledyard Weld, the first acting governor of Colorado Territory and namesake of Weld County, Colorado.
- Theresa Weld was an American figure skater and Olympic bronze medalist at the 1920 Summer Olympics. She was also United States national champion.
- Theodore Dwight Weld was one of the most important abolitionists in American history, a colleague of John Quincy Adams, and a disciple of Charles Grandison Finney. Theodore Dwight Weld married civil rights advocate Angelina Emily Grimké who then became Angelina Emily Grimké Weld.

== Returning to Europe ==
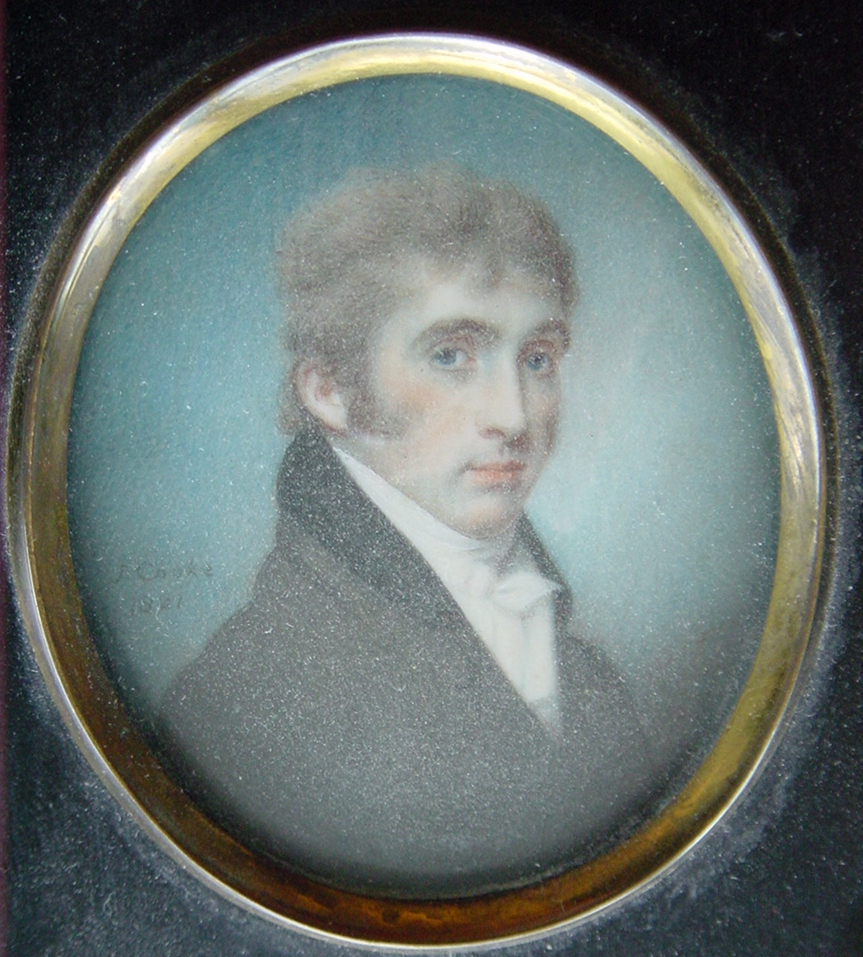
Isaac Weld (1774–1856)

Isaac Weld (1774–1856) was an Irish topographical writer, explorer, and artist and member of the Royal Dublin Society, for whom he wrote the Statistical Survey of Co. Roscommon. Like his father and grandfather, he was named Isaac for his great-grandfather Nathaniel's friend, Isaac Newton. Born in Dublin, he and his sister, Esther, were the children of a first marriage. Esther married George Ensor, and their half-brother was Charles Richard Weld. They were possibly descended from the Welds of Suffolk, via New England. their reputed great-great-great-grandfather, Thomas Welde, was among those who helped to translate the Bay Psalm Book from the original Hebrew, for Stephen Daye, a London printer who took his press to the colony and published the first book in the American colonies. Thomas Welde returned to England and Gateshead. Isaac's great-great-grandfather, reverend Edmund Weld of Blarney Castle, County Cork, Ireland (1655), lived during Cromwell's time. He later moved to Dublin.

There were at least two other 19th-century Welds descended from Joseph's older brother Thomas who returned to England in 1641. Both these Welds were born in Hampton, Connecticut, and were the sons of Ludovicus Weld.

== See also ==
- Weld-Blundell family
