= Thomas Willisel =

English naturalist

Thomas Willisel (bapt. 1621 – c. 1675) was an English naturalist.

== Life ==
Thomas Willislel was a native of Northamptonshire, according to Aubrey, or, according to Ray, of Lancashire. He served as a foot-soldier under Cromwell. "Lying at St. James's (a garrison then I thinke), he happened", writes Aubrey, "to go along with some simplers. He liked it so well that he desired to go with them as often as they went, and tooke such a fancy to it that in a short time he became a good botanist. He was a lusty fellow, and had an admirable sight, which is of great use for a simpler; was as hardy as a highlander; all his cloathes on his back not worth ten groates, an excellent marksman, and would maintain himselfe with his dog and his gun, and his fishing-line. The botanists of London did much encourage him, and employed him all over England, Scotland, and good part of Ireland, if not all; where he made brave discoveries, for which his name will ever be remembered in herballs. If he saw a strange fowle or bird, or a fish, he would have it and case it". (Note: Aubrey, Natural History of Wiltshire, ed. Britton, p. 48.)

He was employed by Merret for five summers to make collections for his Pinax. Weld records that in October 1669 Willisel, who had been engaged by the Royal Society to collect zoological and botanical specimens in England and Scotland, returned to London with a large collection of rare Scottish birds and fishes and dried plants. (Note: Weld, History of the Royal Society, i. 224.) He also prints the sealed commission given by the Society to Willisel. Evelyn, who was present at the meeting of the Royal Society in October 1669, writes: "Our English itinerant presented an account of his autumnal peregrinations about England, for which we hired him". (Note: Evelyn, Diary, vol. i.) In his Catalogus Plantarum Angliæ, published in 1670, Ray styles Willisel "a person employed by the Royal Society in the search of natural rarities, both animals, plants, and minerals; the fittest man for such a purpose that I know in England, both for his skill and industry". In 1671 the great naturalist took Willisel with him on a tour through the northern counties. (Note: Memorials of Ray, ed. Lankester, p. 26.)

Pulteney says: "I believe he was once sent into Ireland by Dr. Sherard. … The emolument arising from these employments was probably among the principal means of his subsistence". (Note: Pulteney, Sketches of the Progress of Botany, i. 349.) As Aubrey records that "all the profession he had was to make pegges for shoes", this last supposition of Pulteney's is highly probable. Aubrey is our authority for all else we know of Willisel. "When", he says, "ye Lord John Vaughan, now Earle of Carbery, was made governour of Jamaica [in 1674], I did recommend him to his excellency, who made him his gardiner there. He dyed within a yeare after his being there, but had made a fine collection of plants and shells, which the Earle of Carbery hath by him; and had he lived he would have given the world an account of the plants, animals, and fishes of that island. He could write a hand indifferent legible, and had made himself master of all the Latine names: he pourtrayed but untowardly".

Some plants collected by Willisel were preserved in Sir Hans Sloane's herbarium.
