= Richard Baker (merchant) =

American merchant

Richard Baker Jr.
- Born: January 22, 1819; Wellfleet, Massachusetts
- Died: January 1, 1875 (aged 55); Boston, Massachusetts
- Occupation: Merchant
- Spouse: Ellen Whittemore (m. 1847)
- Children: 4

Richard Baker Jr. (January 22, 1819 – January 1, 1875) was an American businessman who was called the "King of Merchants". He is best known today for building Westcliff, a large cottage in Newport, Rhode Island, designed by Richard Morris Hunt.

== Early life ==
Baker was born on January 22, 1819, in Wellfleet, Massachusetts on Cape Cod and was brought up in Charlestown, the oldest neighborhood in Boston. He was a son of Capt. Richard Baker (1794–1876) and Jerusha (née Rich) Baker (1798–1882). Among his siblings were Susan Baker (wife of Massachusetts Representative Samuel Atherton) and fellow merchant, Frederick Baker.

His paternal grandparents were Richard Baker and Huldah (née Rich) Baker. His maternal grandparents were Mary and Uriah Rich.

== Career ==
In 1834, Baker became clerk to William Fletcher Weld, eventually becoming partner in the well-known shipping and commercial house of William F. Weld & Co. in 1842, which "was among the largest ship-owners in the world." Upon the 1866 retirement of William F. Weld and William G. Weld, Baker formed a new firm, of which he was managing partner, "under the style of William F. Weld & Co., consisting of Richard Baker, Jr. and George W. Weld, of Boston, and Frederick Baker, of New York." Between 1869 and 1870, the firm "owned about thirty-five barks, ships, and steamers."

Baker was called the "King of Merchants" and was said "that he could transact more business in a few hours than any one else in a whole day." He was reported to be a millionaire.

== Personal life ==
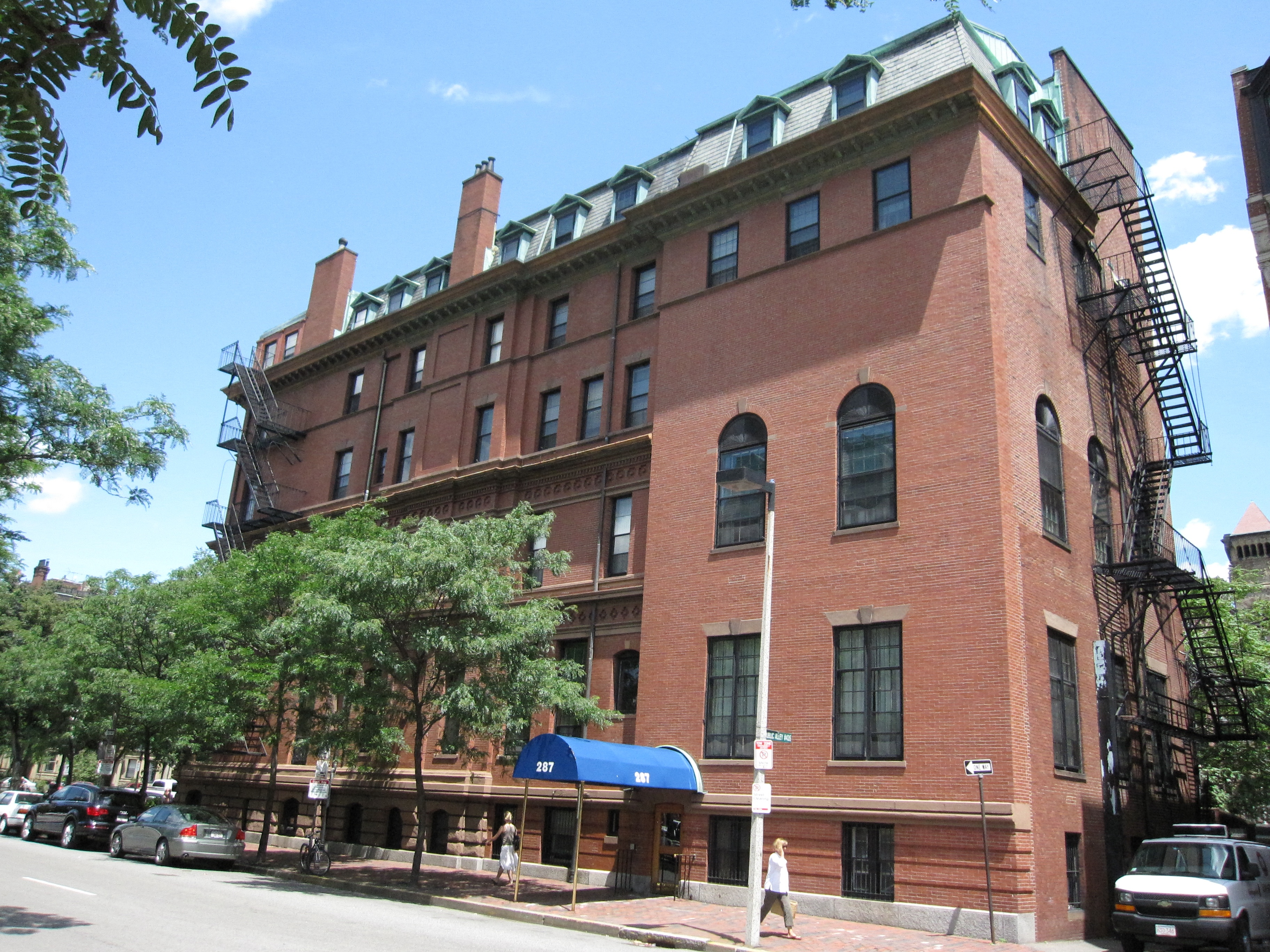
Baker's Boston residence, 152 Commonwealth

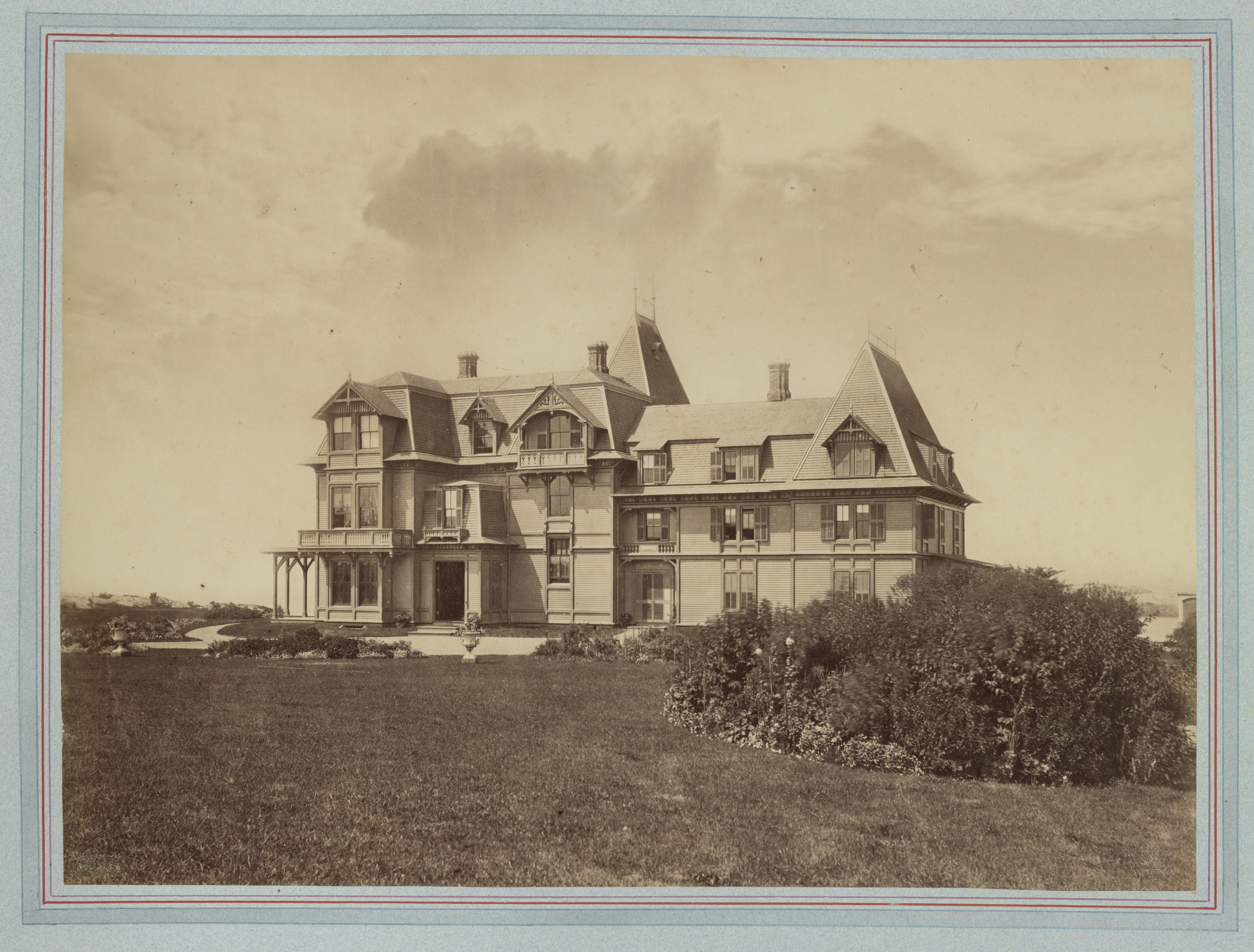
Baker's Newport cottage, Westcliff, 1876

In 1847, Baker was married to Ellen Whittemore (1827–1896) in Charlestown. Together, they were the parents of:

- Mary Rich Baker, who married leather dealer Thomas Owen Richardson in 1885.
- William W. Baker (1851–1882), an invalid.
- Alice Starr Baker (1859–1880), who died unmarried.
- Richard Baker III (d. 1896)

Baker died of tuberculosis at his residence in Boston on January 1, 1875. After a funeral held at his home in Boston, he was buried at Mount Auburn Cemetery in Cambridge. In his will, he left his wife "his residences in Boston and Newport, his furniture, paintings, horses and carriages, and $10,000 at once, and $500,000 in trust--total supposed to amount to about $900,000." His widow died in Newport in 1896.

=== Residences ===
In 1871, Baker purchased 152 Commonwealth Avenue in Boston from the Jarvis Williams estate and moved there from their previous home, 47 Mount Vernon on Beacon Hill. The house had been designed by architect Henry Richards of the firm of Ware and Van Brunt. (Note: Some sources claim the Baker's Boston residence, 152 Commonwealth, was designed by architects Peabody and Stearns, not Henry Richards.) After his wife's death, the 152 Commonwealth was sold in 1900 to stockbroker William Bowditch Rogers and his wife, Augusta (née Kellogg) Rogers. Today, the entrance is on Dartmouth Street and the house is the home of Chilton Club.

The Bakers purchased a cottage on Ledge Road, Newport, Rhode Island that had been built by Charles Mixter in 1854. They hired noted architect Richard Morris Hunt to renovate and greatly enlarge the house, which they called Westcliff. The property, a large asymmetrical stick style home, overlooked Bailey's Beach. After his wife's death in 1896, the cottage was rented out, including to Cornelius Vanderbilt III and his wife, Grace Vanderbilt for a season in 1899. In 1923, his daughter sold Westcliff which then comprised 10 acres, and was located between the Charles W. Lippitt and Oliver Gould Jennings estates. The estate was sold to J. Murray Howe of Boston, who transferred it to Henry J. O'Meara of Boston, who tore down the house and developed the estate into several different properties.

=== Legacy ===
In the 1879, Channing Memorial Church in Newport commissioned artist John La Farge to design what was then the largest stained glass window of his career as a memorial to Baker and his daughter, Alice Starr Baker, who died in 1880. Baker donated $5,000 to Harvard College upon his death.

His daughter, Mary Richardson, left a bequest of $1,000,000 for the erection of the Baker Memorial Hospital, to be named after her parents. The hospital, which was the first "white-collar hospital" became part of the Massachusetts General Hospital, before it was torn down.
