= William Gordon Weld =

American shipmaster and ship owner (1775–1825)

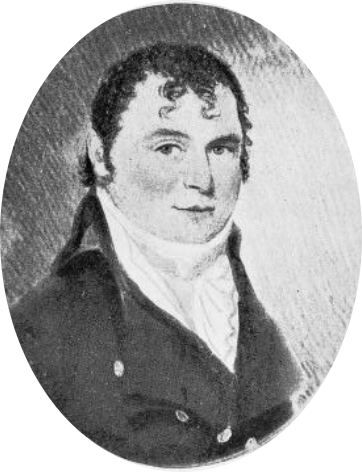
William G Weld

William Gordon Weld (1775–1825) was an American shipmaster and ship owner. He is notable as an ancestor of several famous Welds.

== Ancestry and early life ==
Weld was a descendant of Joseph Weld, who came to Massachusetts Bay Colony in the early 17th century and was involved in the Pequot War and subsequent negotiations. He was born on 8 May 1775 at Roxbury, Suffolk, Massachusetts.

Weld lived his early life in Weld Hall, the family home on Weld Hill in the Forest Hills section of what is now Jamaica Plain. Named after the prominent local revolutionary sympathizer and historian Reverend Dr. William Gordon, Weld was the fifth son of Colonel Eleazer Weld, one of seven Weld family American Revolutionary War veterans.

Like many family members, William Gordon Weld graduated from Harvard, a university with Weld ties from the 17th to the 21st centuries.

He practiced law in Mr. Quincy's law office in Roxbury, Massachusetts. Later at the age of nineteen "he was master of a packet-ship sailing between London and Boston, and at twenty-seven was attacked off Tunis by Algerine pirates, not only beating them back in fair fight, but recapturing two American vessels which had been seized."

== Maritime industry ==
Weld turned his attention away from agriculture and concentrated on maritime shipping. He created a fleet of "China clippers" and profited from trade between Asia and the New World.

His fortune suffered a notable setback during the War of 1812. A British frigate cruising off Boston Harbor captured one Weld's ships carrying a valuable cargo of wine and Spanish silver dollars. Weld himself was captured and may have paid a ransom to be released.

== Legacy ==
In 1798, Weld married Hannah Minot (1780–1860), a member of a Massachusetts family represented by such notables as George Minot and Henry Davis Minot. They had one daughter and eight sons. (see chart).

The home William and Hannah built was in the Minot family's possession by the mid 19th century and later became the home of Andrew James Peters, Mayor of Boston, (and James Michael Curley rival) after he married a Minot.

Among those descended from William Gordon Weld and Hannah Minot are:

- Son William Fletcher Weld — shipping, railroad and real estate magnate
- Son Stephen Minot Weld — politician, namesake of Weld Hall at Harvard University
- Grandson George Walker Weld — financier of the Weld Boathouse
- Grandson Stephen Minot Weld Jr. — American Civil War general
- Great-grandson Philip Saltonstall Weld — World War II commando, publisher, environmentalist
- Great-granddaughter Isabel Weld Perkins — socialite philanthropist
- Great-great-great-grandson William Weld — former Governor of Massachusetts
