= Great Bridge (Cambridge) =

Bridge in Massachusetts, United States

Coordinates: 42.369°N 71.123°W

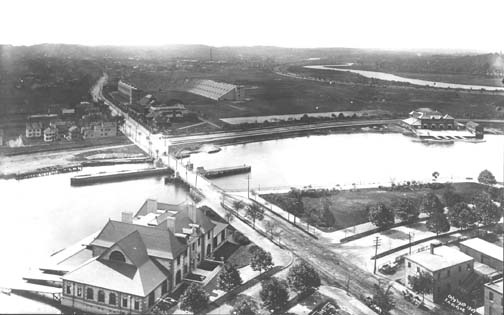
The Great Bridge in 1907, with the recently constructed Weld Boathouse in the foreground and Harvard Stadium in the background.

The Great Bridge over the Charles River connected Cambridge, Massachusetts, to what is now known as Allston, Boston, Massachusetts. The Great Bridge was built in 1660–1662 at what was then called Brighton Street, and was the first bridge to span the Charles. A toll was authorized in 1670. The bridge was rebuilt in 1862.

The Great Bridge was at the site of the modern-day Anderson Memorial Bridge, which connects John F. Kennedy Street in Cambridge to North Harvard Street in Allston.
