= Baker Memorial Hospital =

Historic hospital in Massachusetts

- Massachusetts General Hospital

Geography
- Location: West End, Boston, Massachusetts, United States

Links
- Lists: Hospitals in Massachusetts

Baker Memorial Hospital, affiliated with the Massachusetts General Hospital, was the first "white collar hospital" in Boston, Massachusetts in the United States. It was meant to treat people from the middle class receive hospital care on an inpatient basis at affordable rates. Daily rates ranged between $4.50 and $6.50 with a daily cap of about $150. Mary Richardson left a $1,000,000 to fund the hospital in honor of her father, Richard Baker, Jr.
