= Stephen Minot Weld Jr. =

Union United States Army officer

- Born: January 4, 1842; Jamaica Plain, Massachusetts, U.S.
- Died: March 16, 1920 (aged 78); Boca Grande, Florida, U.S.
- Father: Stephen Minot Weld
- Relatives: William Fletcher Weld (uncle)
- Family: Weld family

Stephen Minot Weld Jr. (January 4, 1842 – March 16, 1920), a member of Boston's illustrious Weld Family, was a horticulturalist and much-decorated United States Army officer of the American Civil War.

== Early life ==
Weld was the son of Sarah Bartlett and Stephen Minot Weld. He prepared for higher education at the Jamaica Plain boarding school mastered by his father. Weld was an abstemious young man who claimed:

I did not touch a drop of wine or liquor all through my college career until about a month before I graduated, nor did I smoke until then.

Once he arrived at Harvard College, however, Weld had little love of that institution's authority figures and wrote:

The whole spirit between the Faculty and the students was one of war...we looked on the Faculty as our oppressors, and we were--a great many of us--up to every devilment that we could think of, to trouble and bother them....The College then was more in the nature of a boarding-school.

Stephen Minot Weld's older cousin George Walker Weld (for whom Weld Boathouse is named) was at Harvard the same time as Stephen and the pair sometimes cooperated in their mischief.

== View on slavery ==
Weld was a first-year student at Harvard Law School when the war broke out and he was eager to join the action. Although Weld soon distinguished himself in this war which put an end to slavery in the United States, he was no abolitionist and had:

little liking for those he considered antislavery zealots...when abolitionist Senator Charles Sumner made an appearance at the Harvard class day exercises in 1860, Weld was a member of the graduating class that booed and hissed him. Like most conservative upper-class New Englanders, Weld disliked slavery, but he had no special sympathy for the sufferings of blacks; he felt that, if left alone, the South's "peculiar institution" would die out of its own accord.

Thus it seems that Weld viewed the Union cause as primarily one of putting down Southern rebellion, rather than emancipating enslaved African-Americans, at least initially.

== Civil War ==
Weld was appointed a 2nd lieutenant in the 18th Massachusetts Regiment on January 27, 1862, at the age of 19. He was promoted to 1st lieutenant on November 1 of the same year and to captain on June 1, 1863. He was honorably discharged on December 25, 1863. His regiment was part of the Army of the Potomac and he participated in the battles of Second Battle of Bull Run, Antietam, and Gettysburg. He was twice captured by Confederate forces, and twice exchanged. A bullet once pierced his boot and he had his horse shot from under him. On June 2, 1864, he was commissioned as lieutenant colonel of the 56th Massachusetts Regiment and was promoted to colonel in command of the regiment on May 31, 1864. He was mustered out of the Army on July 12, 1865.

On January 13, 1866, Weld was nominated by President Andrew Johnson to be breveted (i.e. an honorary promotion) to the rank of brevet brigadier general, U.S. Volunteers, to rank from March 13, 1865 (when he was 23 years old), for gallant and meritorious services. The U.S. Senate confirmed the brevet on March 12, 1866. Even today, Weld family members remember him as "the General."

In 1866 he was elected a member of the Ancient and Honorable Artillery Company of Massachusetts. He was also a member of the Military Order of the Loyal Legion of the United States.

== Misfortune ==
After the Civil War, Weld returned home to misfortune. In 1867, his father died suddenly, prompting his uncle William Fletcher Weld to erect Harvard's Weld Hall in his honor. Soon after, a felting mill in which he had inherited about $14,000 failed. He made a new start by borrowing $25,000 from friends to buy a cotton mill that was connected with the first venture. That mill, however, was swept away by a flood when a pond two miles (3 km) away broke its dam.

== S.M. Weld & Co. ==
To pay his debts, Weld became a cotton broker and eventually built a fortune. Despite setbacks such as the embezzlement of $326,000 by a friend and business partner, the downtown Boston firm of S.M. Weld & Company prospered and opened branches in India and Japan. This made "the General" another very wealthy Weld.

== Horticulture ==
Weld had a great interest in botany and became president of the Massachusetts Horticultural Society in 1906; he also helped Charles Sprague Sargent build the collection at the Arnold Arboretum. But his greatest horticultural achievement was his own estate: Rockweld in Dedham, Massachusetts.

== Rockweld ==
Weld lived on a 52-acre (210,000 m^{2}) estate he named "Rockweld" in Dedham, most of which was surrounded by a high stone wall. He created one of the finest rock gardens in the country and employed eight gardeners. His estate had a water tower and a dozen greenhouses, one of which was dedicated to growing grapes year round.

He built his mansion on a craggy hill with a dramatic view of the Charles River valley. Outcrops, boulders, woodlands, and ponds dotted the surrounding property, offering endless opportunities to satisfy Weld's passion for horticulture.

Frederick Law Olmsted sited the house and planned the driveway and west terrace. Weld designed the grounds, pathways, and an extensive rock garden. He brought plants from around the world to embellish his designs. At its peak, Rockwell had 500 varieties of flowering plants.

A few years after Weld's death, the estate was sold to H. Wendell Endicott, son of Henry B. Endicott, who founded the Endicott Shoe Company. Endicott maintained and expanded the gardens, but razed Rockweld to build a Normandy French-style chateau designed by Charles Platt. This edifice, known as Endicott House, is now a conference facility maintained by MIT.

== Indian Neck ==
In his later years, Weld spent much of his time at the family compound he established near Cape Cod at Indian Neck, a spot which commands a majestic view of Bourne Cove and the Atlantic Ocean. There he created another spectacular garden and built a private 18-hole golf course as well as several comfortable houses. In addition to time playing golf, Weld enjoyed fishing and shooting on the Cape.

A transitional figure between the nineteenth century and the modern era, Weld also acquired hundreds of acres along the shores of Buzzards Bay and transferred lots to friends at cost. This created an enclave of old Yankee stock with similar values in a part of Massachusetts that was increasingly heterogeneous.

Descendants of "the General" still own a cluster of six separate houses at the family compound in Wareham, although in recent decades a preponderance of female offspring has made the Weld surname rare among them. The historic cottages now house Edges, Bigelows, Bentons, and Baldwins.

== Family ==
Weld married Eloise Rodman (of the Forest Hills family of that name) in 1869 and they lived together on the Dedham estate. Stephen and Eloise had six boys and one girl before she died in 1898.

Among these children, twins Stephen and Alfred succumbed to rheumatic fever at 17 and tuberculosis at 32, respectively. Eight-year-old Lothrop Motley Weld drowned in the channel at Bourne Cove in Wareham a year after the family purchased their property there. In 1907, his daughter, Eloise, died in England at the age of 28. A granddaughter, Eloise Rodman Weld (1911–2001), married firstly Wiliam Lukens Elkins III, a grandson of William Lukens Elkins, secondly William Thomas Fleming Jr., and thirdly, Arthur Osgood Choate Jr., a grandson of George Cheyne Shattuck Choate.

In 1904, Weld married Susan Edith Waterbury, who was 24 years younger than he was and had been governess to his younger sons. On their honeymoon they toured the Civil War battlefields where Weld had fought 40 years earlier.

== Death ==
"The General" died in the winter of 1920 in Boca Grande, Florida. Befitting his status as a Civil War veteran, a single bugler played taps at his funeral.

== Trivia ==
- Actress Tuesday Weld is his great-granddaughter.
- Former Governor of Massachusetts William Weld is his first cousin twice removed.
- His wife was the niece of the historian John Lothrop Motley. Lothrop Motley Weld (the son described above) is John Lothrop Motley's namesake.

== Archives and records ==
- Stephen M. Weld and Company records at Baker Library Special Collections, Harvard Business School.
