= Isaac Weld =

Anglo-Irish explorer (1774–1856)

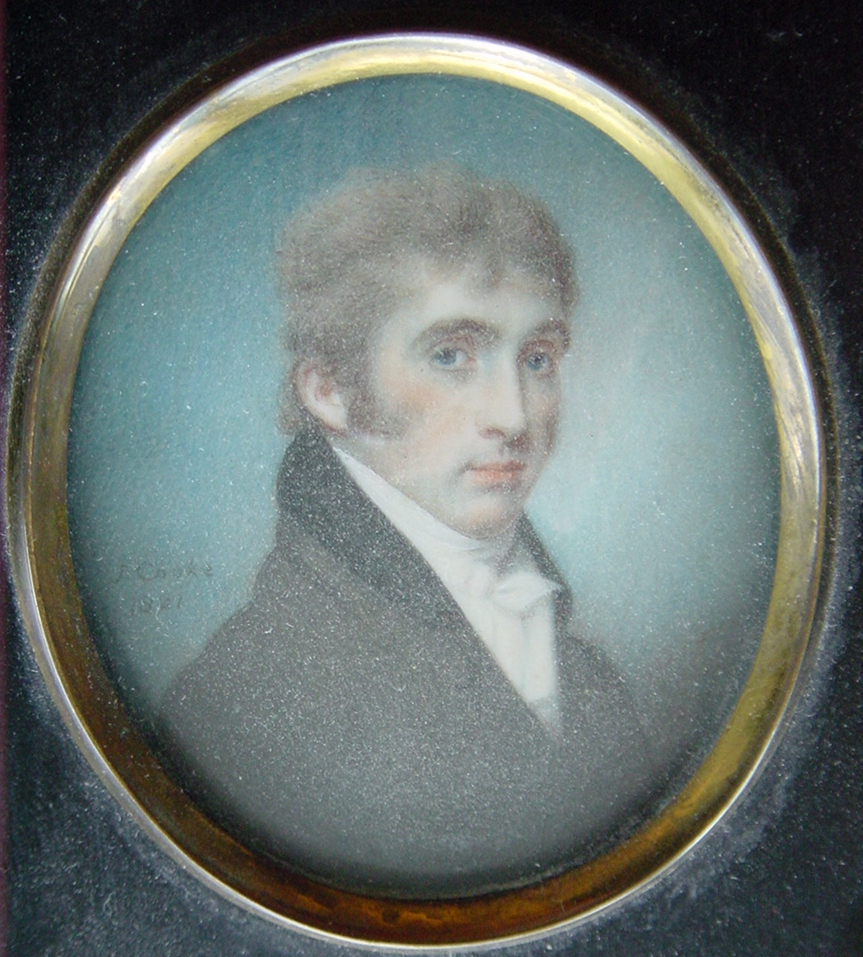
Isaac Weld.

Isaac Weld JP FGSD MRIA (1774–1856) was an Anglo-Irish topographical writer, explorer, and artist. He travelled extensively in North America was a member of the Royal Dublin Society.

== Early life ==
Weld was born on 15 March 1774 on Fleet Street, Dublin, Ireland. His name stems from his great-grandfather Nathanael Weld's close friendship with Sir Isaac Newton, and as such both his grandfather and father were also named Isaac. His father was a close friend of Charles James Fox. Weld's sister married the writer and political economist George Ensor, and their half-brother was Charles Richard Weld, traveler and author of A Vacation Tour in the United States and Canada (London, 1855), which was dedicated to his brother, Isaac. He was sent to the school of Samuel Whyte at Grafton Street and from there to another private school Barbauld at Palgrave near the town of Diss in Norfolk. From Diss he proceeded to Norwich as a private pupil of Dr William Enfield. He left Norwich in 1793. He married Alexandra Hope in Edinburgh in 1802. He had a daughter Esther, named after his sister, born 7 January 1804. In later life, Weld spent much time in Italy and particularly Rome, where he developed a friendship with Antonio Canova.

== Travels in the United States and Canada ==
Book/Drawings by Isaac Weld

In 1795, he sailed to Philadelphia from Dublin and spent 15 months travelling in the United States and Canada. He visited Monticello and Mount Vernon and met George Washington and Thomas Jefferson. He journeyed to the United States and Canada partly as an adventure and partly as research into suitable countries for the Irish to emigrate to: "any part of those territories might be looked forward to as an eligible and agreeable place of abode". He travelled on horseback, by coach and by canoe in Canada with local native guides. Weld returned in 1797 "without entertaining the slightest wish to revisit it." He found the Americans to be obsessed with material things and preferred Canada. His published Travels in the States of North America (1799) quickly went into three editions and was translated into French, German, Italian, and Dutch.

Travelling North America in 1804, the poet and lyricist Thomas Moore (whom Weld had preceded at Whyte's school in Dublin) was guided by Weld's Travels, and took Weld's lead in his less than flattering estimate of his American hosts.

== Quotes from Travels Through the States of North America ==
Weld wrote on slavery that "there will be an end to slavery in the United States…[as] negroes will not remain deaf to the inviting call of liberty forever." With regard to Americans in general, he stated, "civility cannot be purchased from them on any terms; they seem to think that it is incompatible with freedom". On Washington, DC, he wrote "If the affairs of the United States go on as rapidly as they have done, it will become the grand emporium of the West, and rival in magnitude and splendour the cities of the whole world."

== Ireland ==
He visited Killarney, navigated the lakes in a boat he made from compressed brown paper, and published Scenery of Killarney (1807), illustrated with his own drawings. He is also well known for his drawings of American life and, in particular, the Niagara Falls.

In May 1815 he sailed from Dún Laoghaire to London in the 14 horsepower (10 kW) steamboat Thames, the first such vessel to make the passage. He compiled the Statistical Survey of the County of Roscommon (1838) for the Royal Dublin Society, of which he was Honorary Secretary and Vice-President. He died at his home, Ravenswell, near Bray, County Wicklow, 4 August 1856, and is buried in Mount Jerome Cemetery, Dublin.

== The Welds of New England ==
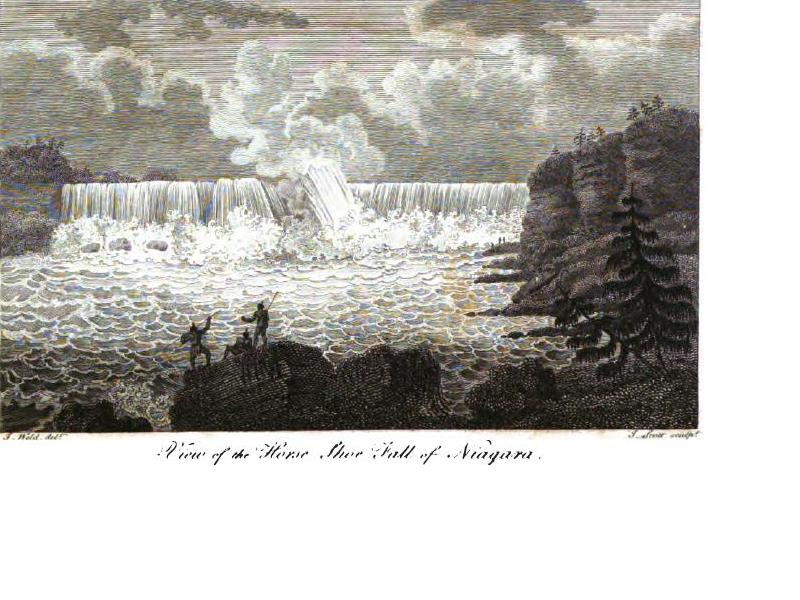
The Horseshoe Falls, Niagara by Issac Weld

Isaac Weld is part of the Weld family of New England. His ancestor, Thomas Weld, was a Puritan minister from Suffolk, England who was one of three brothers who emigrated to Roxbury, Massachusetts in 1632.

Isaac Weld's great-great-grandfather Thomas Weld helped to publish the Bay Psalm Book, the first book published in America. Eventually he returned to England and Gateshead. Isaac's great-grandfather (Nathaniel), was graduated at Harvard College. He left Massachusetts for Kinsale and then Blarney Castle, County Cork, Ireland (1655) to be a Puritan Chaplain with Oliver Cromwell. He later moved to Dublin.

The family that stayed in America grew in wealth and influence and includes such notables as Governor of Massachusetts William Weld, Isabel Weld Perkins, and Theodore Dwight Weld.

== Books written and published ==
- Weld's Travels
- Travels Through the States of North America and the Provinces of Upper and Lower Canada During the Years 1795, 1796 and 1797
- Statistical Survey of the County of Roscommon, drawn up under the direction of the Dublin Society
- Scenery of Killarney 1807
- Ravenswell Bray Co. Dublin, The Seat of Isaac Weld Esq. Sketches by Isaac Weld A.D. 1817

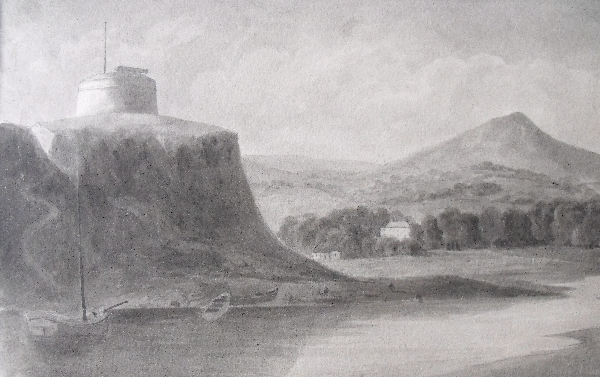
Views from Ravenswell, Bray, County Wicklow the seat of Isaac Weld – sketch by Isaac Weld – 1817
