= Thomas Welde =

- Born: ca. 1595; Sudbury, Suffolk, England
- Died: ca. 1661; Ireland
- Citizenship: Englishman
- Education: Trinity College, Cambridge
- Occupations: Clegyman, missionary, author and polemicist
- Years active: 1618-1661
- Notable work: Narragansett Patent
- Title: Ordained minister
- Children: Edmund Welde
- Parents: Edmund (father); Amy (mother)

Thomas Welde (bap. 1595 – 1661) was an English clergyman, who became a Puritan, emigrant to New England, colonial missionary, author and polemicist. His sojourn in the New World turned out be brief lasting only nine years, but he left his mark. On returning to England, he was a parish priest and became embroiled in controversy with the Quakers. His son, Edmund, also came back to Europe and started an Irish Weld line and became chaplain to Oliver Cromwell.

== Biography ==
Thomas Welde, son of Edmund and Amy, was baptised in 1595 at St Peter's Sudbury, Suffolk. His ancestral roots may have been in Cheshire, via Rushton, Northamptonshire. He received degrees from Trinity College, Cambridge in England in 1613 and was ordained in 1618. He formed lasting friendships with like-minded student activists, among whom was Oliver Cromwell. In 1624 he served as a minister at Terling in Essex. He joined the Puritans and sailed for Boston, landing on 5 June 1632 on the "William and Francis". His first role was as first minister of The First Church in Roxbury in Roxbury, Massachusetts from 1632 to 1641.

After moving to New England, via Amsterdam, he became involved in local politicking and was a strong opponent of John Wheelwright in the Antinomian debate and wrote a book on the topic. Welde also assisted in the composition of the Bay Psalm Book and became an overseer of the newly established Harvard College. He was also an inquisitor at the trials of Anne Hutchinson during the Antinomian Controversy and was one of her most vocal opponents.

In 1641, he left part of his family in Massachusetts Bay Colony and returned to England with his brother, John, on business for the General Court of Massachusetts. Among his instructions were the acquisition of an extension to the colonial charter to include the territory of present-day Rhode Island. This territory had been settled by Roger Williams and Anne Hutchinson, to the dismay of the Puritan leaders of Massachusetts. Welde created a fraudulent document (known as the "Narragansett Patent") to bolster the Massachusetts claim to the territory. His failure in this effort contributed to his dismissal as a colonial agent. He accepted a living in Gateshead. Welde's son, Edmund, settled in Ireland and became a chaplain to Oliver Cromwell, serving until the latter's death. Welde senior never returned to the colony. He is said to have died on 23 March 1660/61.

== American descendants ==
Welde's son remained in Massachusetts and was the ancestor of Theodore Dwight Weld and Ezra Greenleaf Weld, two important figures of the 19th-century abolitionist movement.

Thomas Welde's younger brother, who also remained in the New World, was the ancestor of the most prominent branch of the Weld Family in America, including former Governor of Massachusetts William Weld and actress Tuesday Weld. Two buildings at Harvard (Weld Hall and Weld Boathouse) are named for his descendants.
