= Anderson Bridge massacre =

Coordinates: 24.0450°N 90.9947°E

Anderson Bridge massacre অ্যান্ডারসন সেতুর হত্যাকাণ্ড
- Location: Anderson Bridge, East Bengal, Dominion of Pakistan
- Date: 12 February 1950 (UTC+6:00)
- Target: Bengali Hindus
- Attack type: mass murder, massacre
- Weapons: Swords, Machetes
- Perpetrator: alleged to be East Bengal authorities

Anderson Bridge massacre (Bengali: অ্যান্ডারসন সেতুর হত্যাকাণ্ড) refers to the massacre of Hindu passengers on the Anderson Bridge on 12 February 1950.

== Background ==
Anderson Bridge also known as the Bhairab Bridge is a 1 km long railway bridge over the Meghna River, connecting Bhairab Bazar Junction in Kishoreganj District with Ashuganj in Brahmanbaria District. The bridge carries a single metre-gauge rail track. In 1950, it was an important rail link connecting Dhaka and Mymensingh districts on the west with Sylhet, Comilla and Chittagong districts in the east.

== Events ==
On 12 February, most of the Hindu passengers travelling on this train route were murdered. All the cases followed a pattern. The assailants would board the trains from either side either at Bhairab Bazar Junction or Ashuganj, just before the train departed. They would lock the doors of the compartment from inside. When the train was completely on the bridge, the train would stop. The assailants would pick out the Hindus one by one, force them out of the compartment, slit their throats and throw their corpses into the river.

== See also ==
- 1950 Barisal Riots
