= Anderson Memorial Bridge =

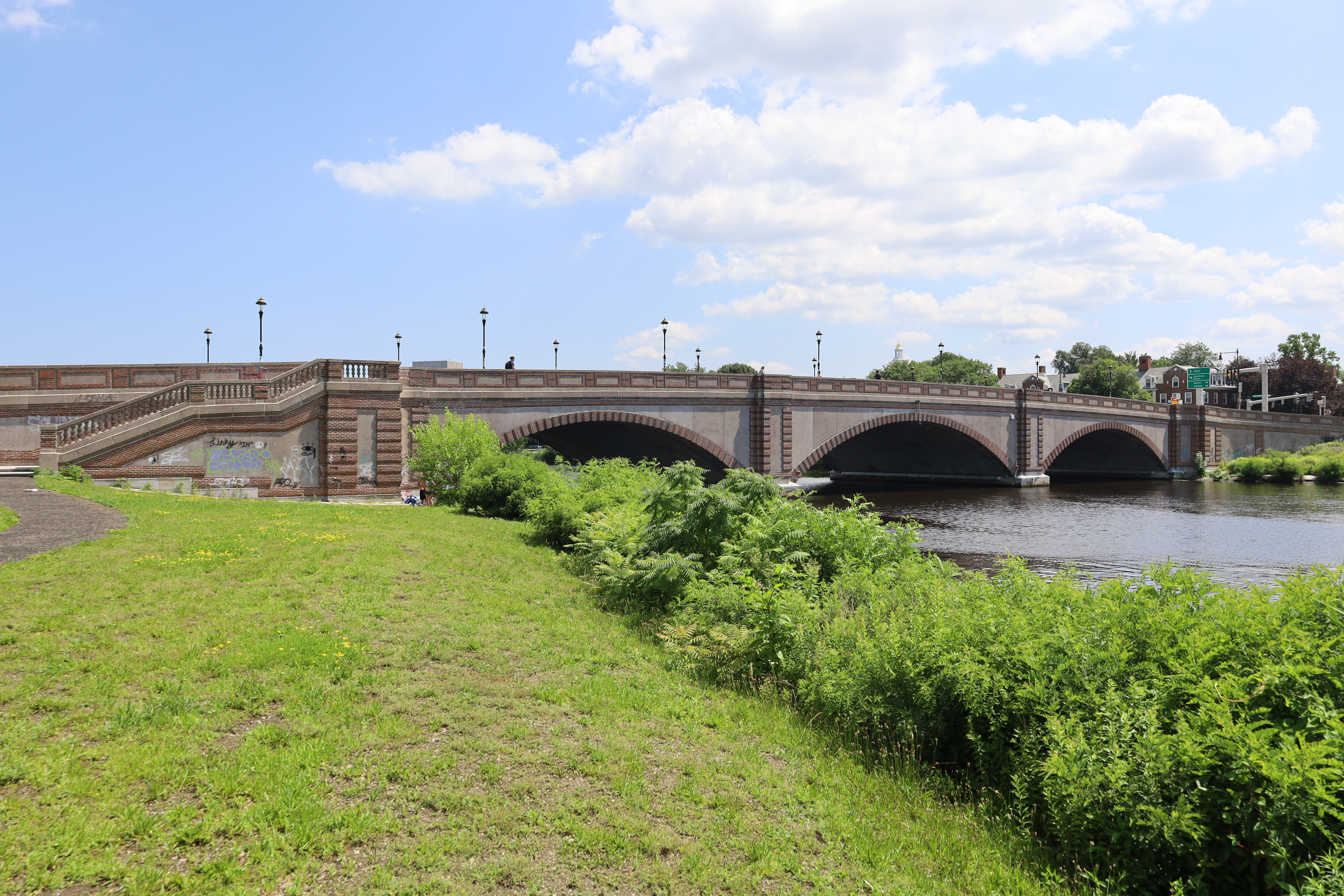
- The Anderson Memorial Bridge in 2023
- Coordinates: 42.3689°N 71.1232°W
- Crosses: Charles River
- Locale: Cambridge, Massachusetts to Boston, Massachusetts
- Maintained by: Massachusetts Department of Transportation
- Preceded by: Great Bridge (Cambridge) (1662)

Characteristics
- Design: arch bridge
- Material: Reinforced concrete faced with red brick

History
- Designer: Wheelwright, Haven and Hoyt
- Construction start: 1913
- Construction end: 1915

Location
- Interactive map of Anderson Memorial Bridge

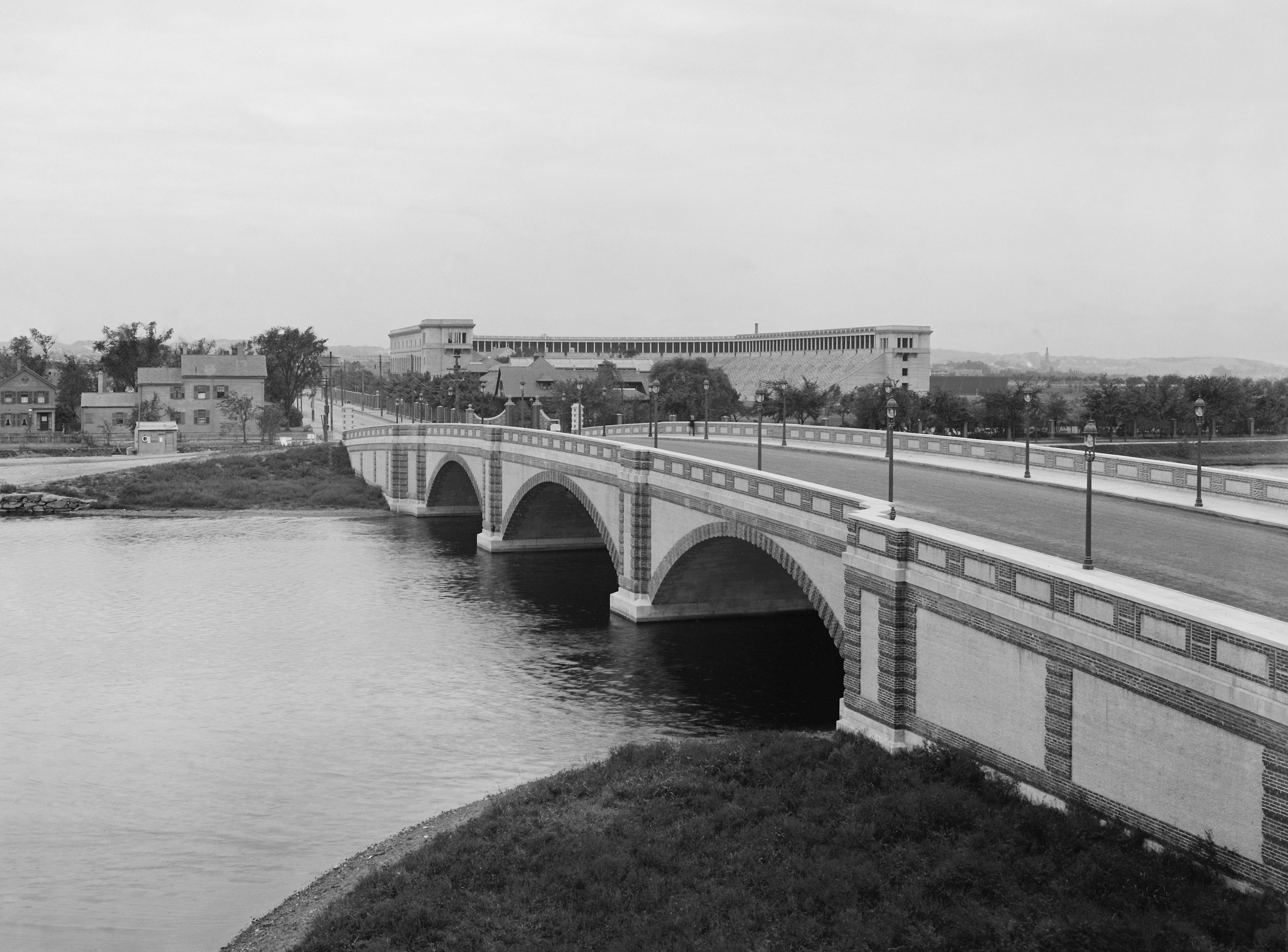
The Anderson Memorial Bridge in the 1910s

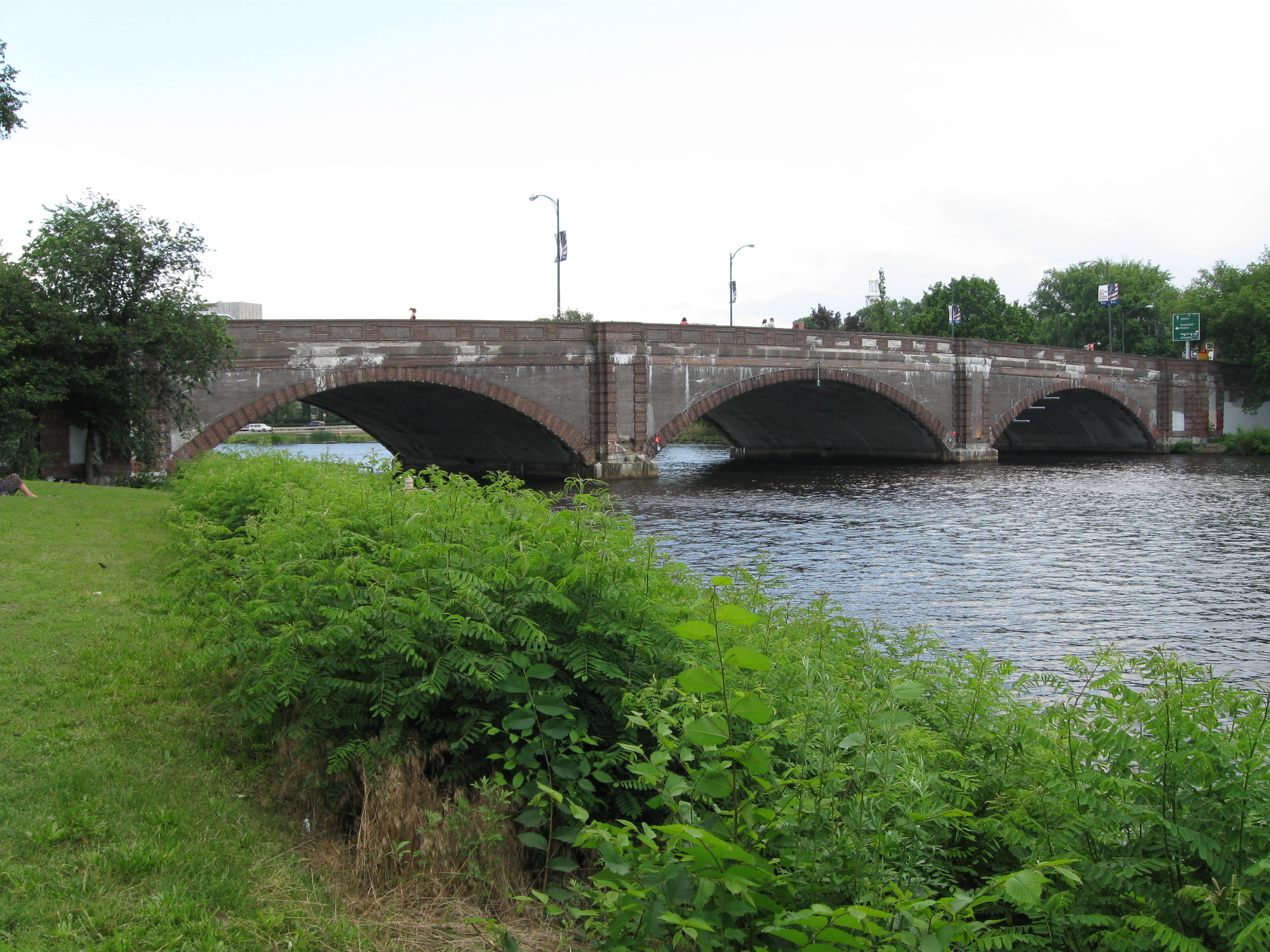
The bridge in 2009, prior to renovations

Anderson Memorial Bridge (commonly but incorrectly called Larz Anderson Bridge) connects Allston, a neighborhood of Boston, and Cambridge. The bridge stands on the site of the Great Bridge built in 1662, the first structure to span the Charles River. It brings Boston traffic (from North Harvard Street) into Harvard Square (via JFK Street) and was finished in 1915.

== Name ==
Often assumed to be named after Larz Anderson, the bridge was actually built by him as a memorial to his father, Nicholas Longworth Anderson. To do so, Anderson was helped by the huge family fortune of his wife, Isabel Weld Perkins. According to the Metropolitan Park Commission of 1913:

The Anderson Memorial Bridge replaces the inadequate, old wooden draw bridge which for many years had marked the former condition of the banks of Charles River. The new bridge was made possible by the gift of the Honorable Larz Anderson as a memorial to his father, a gallant general of the United States Army, Nicholas Longworth Anderson, renowned for his part in the Civil War...

== Construction ==
The bridge was designed by the architectural firm of Wheelwright, Haven and Hoyt and completed under the direction of John R. Rablin, chief engineer for the Metropolitan District Commission.

== Rehabilitation ==
From 2012 to 2016 MassDOT rehabilitated the Anderson Memorial Bridge at a cost of $25 million.. The project repaired the arches and replaced the parapets, sidewalks, lighting, and the bridge deck. The bridge now has three lanes of traffic (two northbound and one southbound) and one bicycle lane.

== Characteristics ==
Anderson Memorial Bridge is constructed of reinforced concrete accented by red brick. The bridge's spandrel walls and panels are fashioned to give the illusion of rough-hewn stone. It has a Georgian Revival design with neoclassical influences that visually connect it to the other bridges that span the Charles as well as the nearby buildings of Harvard University. Architectural author Douglas Shand-Tucci writes:

In that splendid bridge one sees a distinctive architectural mode originally adopted for Harvard athletic facilities, a mode characterized by the distinctive use of concrete-wall fields dressed with red brick decorative trim...Wheelwright endowed the Anderson Bridge not only with the concrete and brick decorative scheme, but with extraordinary and, indeed, fully sculptural ornamental gilded mantlings, detail as flamboyant but infinitely more stylish than of the [Weld] boathouse. This mantling surmounts the entrance piers at both ends of the bridge and was once partnered by gilded street lamps, which ought to be restored.... The mantling was modeled by no less than Johannes Kirchmayer, one of the leading American architectural sculptors of the period. Its richness is perhaps explained by the design concept of the structure: 'May this bridge,' declares a bronze plaque on the Cambridge side, 'connecting the College Yard and playing fields of Harvard, be an ever present reminder to students passing over it of loyalty to country and Alma Mater.'

The bridge stands next to the Weld Boathouse and was designed with "a high enough arch to admit the passage of all sorts of pleasure craft." It may be noted that both the bridge and the boathouse (built in 1906) were funded by heirs to the fortune of 19th century magnate William Fletcher Weld.

== In literature ==
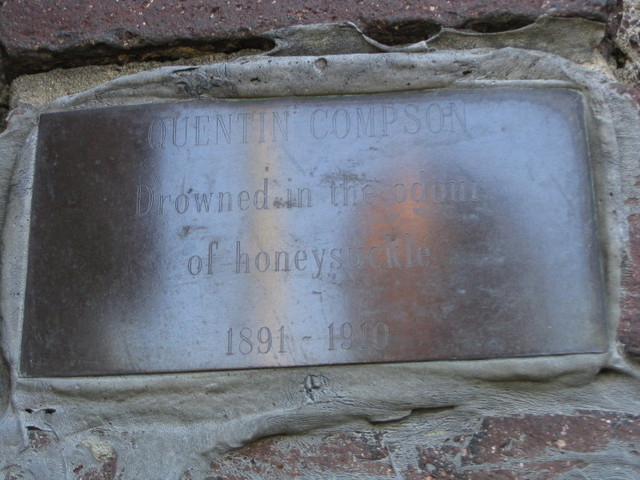
The Plaque on Anderson Bridge

Anderson Memorial Bridge is a likely site of Quentin Compson's suicide in William Faulkner's classic novel The Sound and the Fury. (The exact location of drowning is never specified in the novel.) This is commemorated by a small brass plaque, the size of one brick, that is located on the brick wall of the eastern (Weld Boathouse) side of the bridge, just north of the middle of the bridge span, about eighteen inches from the ground in a small alcove. It reads:

QUENTIN COMPSON

Drowned in the odour of honeysuckle.

1891–1910

== See also ==
- List of crossings of the Charles River
- Anderson Bridge (disambiguation)
