= Anderson Bridge (New Brunswick) =

- Coordinates: 47°00′N 65°36′W
- Carries: Route 8
- Crosses: Northwest Miramichi River
- Locale: Miramichi, New Brunswick, Derby Junction, New Brunswick

Characteristics
- Total length: 500 metres (1,640 feet)
- Width: 1 lane, 1 sidewalk

History
- Built: 1953

Statistics
- Daily traffic: 2,940 (2012)

Location
- Interactive map of Anderson Bridge

The Anderson Bridge is a bridge built in 1953, which crosses the Northwest Miramichi River, and forms part of Route 8, the highway between Miramichi and Fredericton, New Brunswick, Canada. Originally a two-lane bridge, after structural deficiencies were revealed, it was indefinitely reduced to one lane of traffic, with lights at both sides. A new bridge named Natoaganeg Crossing Bridge with a posted speed limit of 100 km/h was opened October 30, 2025.
