= Stephen Minot Weld =

American educator and politician (1806–1867)

Stephen Minot Weld Sr. (1806 – 1867), scion of the Weld Family of Boston, was a schoolmaster, real estate investor and politician. After his death, the Harvard dormitory Weld Hall was raised in his honor.

== Life ==
Weld was the son of prosperous shipmaster and ship owner William Gordon Weld and his well-connected wife Hannah Minot. As an undergraduate, Weld was:

the most popular member of his class, and this without seeking it, without any concession of principle, by virtue of his sterling worth, his elastic spirits, and his strong social sympathies."

By 1827, Weld opened a school for boys in Roxbury in an area which is now the center of Jamaica Plain. He served as schoolmaster for some thirty years and educated over a thousand students from as far away as Cuba and Mexico. Many of his students went on to Harvard.

Weld had considerable business acumen and made wise real estate investments in present-day Jamaica Plain. He was elected twice to the Massachusetts Governor's Council and was an 1864 presidential elector for the Abraham Lincoln ticket.

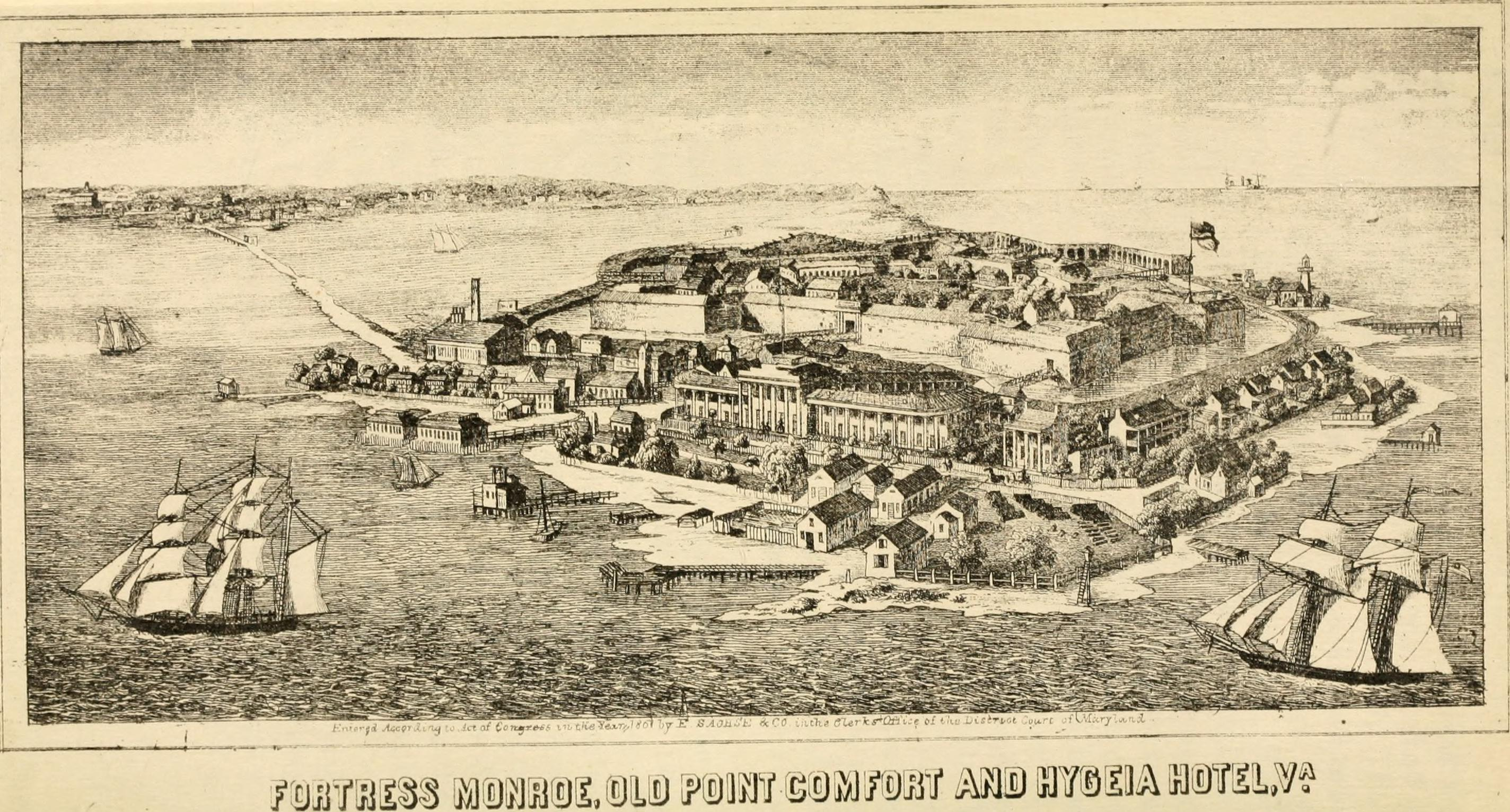
Fortress Monroe, Virginia from War diary and letters of Stephen Minot Weld, 1861-1865

During the American Civil War, Weld recruited soldiers for the Union cause. After the Battle of Appomattox Court House, a battle in which his son Stephen Minot Weld Jr. served with distinction, Weld was instrumental in raising the quarter million dollars that funded the construction of Memorial Hall, a monument to Harvard's war casualties.

Memorial Hall in Harvard Yard, the building Stephen Minot Weld helped build.

Weld spearheaded a 14-year effort that secured passage of the 1865 law authorizing Harvard alumni to elect the members of the Board of Overseers. His reform took control of the institution away from the Commonwealth of Massachusetts and helped established Harvard as a truly private college. Weld himself joined the board that year.

In December 1867, Weld caught a cold while attending a reading in Boston by Charles Dickens and died a week later from pneumonia. His funeral drew a large gathering. His obituary in the Boston Evening Transcript described him as a "bright, cheerful, warm-hearted man who preserved, as a winning grace, his childlike simplicity to the last," and noted he possessed "in every way a genial nature" and lamenting the loss of "the beaming pleasantness of his companionship."

== Weld Hall ==
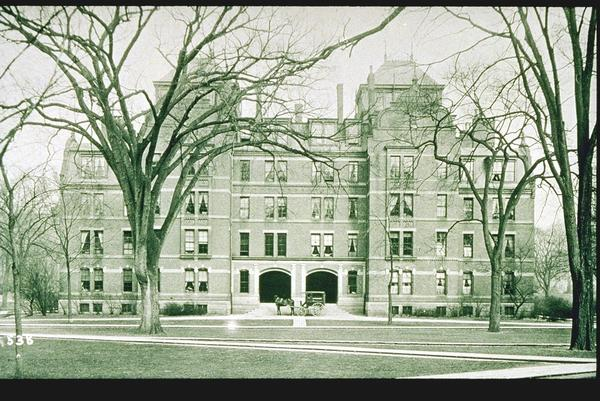
Weld Hall in Harvard Yard, the building named for Stephen Minot Weld.

In 1870, William Fletcher Weld donated money to Harvard for a dormitory to be built in memory of his departed younger brother. This building, called "Weld Hall", should not be confused with the family's ancestral home "Weld Hall" that stood atop Weld Hill in Forest Hills.

The Queen Anne style building was designed by the architectural firm Ware & Van Brunt and constructed between 1871 and 1872. There is an inscription on the dormitory which (when translated from Latin) reads "To Stephen Minot Weld, a man well-deserving of the University, dedicated by his brother."

Tours of Harvard Yard often pause near Weld Hall to note that John F. Kennedy lived there during his freshman year. Other notable residents include Ben Bernanke, Michael Crichton, Christopher Durang, Daniel Ellsberg, Douglas Kenney, Michael Kinsley, Douglas Feith and Neil H. McElroy.
