= George Walker Weld =

- Born: 1840
- Died: 1905 (aged 64–65)
- Monuments: Weld Boathouse
- Education: Harvard College
- Father: William Fletcher Weld
- Relatives: Stephen Minot Weld Jr. (cousin); Isabel Weld Perkins (niece)
- Family: Weld family

George Walker Weld (1840–1905), youngest son of William Fletcher Weld and member of the Weld Family of Boston, was a founding member of the Boston Athletic Association, which is the organizer of the present-day Boston Marathon, and the financier of the Weld Boathouse, a landmark on the Charles River.

== Early life and education ==
Weld was born in 1840 and later attended Harvard College. He was athlete as a student and for some years afterward. He was also mischievous. His younger cousin Stephen Minot Weld Jr. described how George came to his room one right with a plan to

...screw in one of the tutors, named Pearce. The plan was to take a hinge and screw one part to the bottom and the other to the sill of the door, so that in the morning...[Pearce] would find himself locked in and unable to attend prayers, and so could not mark us for our absence.

Pearce heard the Welds and their friend Osborne and chased them down the stairs. At the bottom, the Welds hid under the stairs while Pearce chased Osborne out into a heavy snowfall.

Osborne plunged into a snow-drift and stuck there, and Pearce jumped on him. They had a row and a good deal of scuffling, and in it Pearce, who wore a red wig, lost it. It got lost in the snow and was never found until the next spring.

Osborne was expelled and got his degree many years later, but George's quick wit in swinging beneath the stairs saved the Welds from discipline.

In July 1865, Weld traveled to Europe with his half-sister Anna, who was suffered from illness. Their father paid for Louisa May Alcott to travel with them as a nurse and companion.

As a wealthy bachelor, Weld belonged to several Boston clubs and the New York Yacht Club. Weld was part of the syndicate that built the America's Cup defender Puritan and often invited friends to cruise on his 80-foot steel schooner, Chanticleer, which was considered one of the finest steam yachts in the United States.

When Weld was about age forty he was afflicted with an unknown malady, possibly a neurological disorder, which left him partially paralyzed. A newspaper from his time notes, "The illness of George Walker Weld has assumed a sad form and he has been carried to the Somerville insane asylum."

However, no other evidence from that time suggests that Weld suffered from mental illness. Indeed, 19th century psychiatric diagnosis was notoriously inconsistent and inaccurate by modern standards. Weld seems to have faced his handicap with courage and dignity, and continued to attend Harvard athletic events in a wheelchair or carriage until his death at age 64.

== Weld Boathouse ==
Weld created two boathouses at Harvard. The first was built in 1889. The second was built to replace it in 1906 with funds that Weld bequeathed for that purpose. It is this famous Cambridge landmark, perhaps best viewed from Boston looking across the Charles River, whose centennial was celebrated in 2006.

Next to the boathouse is the Anderson Memorial Bridge, which was built in 1913 by Weld's niece Isabel Weld Perkins and her husband Larz Anderson.
