= Charles Goddard Weld =

American art collector (1857–1911)

Charles Goddard Weld (1857–1911) was a Boston-area physician, sailor, and philanthropist. Weld, a resident of Brookline, Massachusetts, and a scion of the Welds of that area, practiced surgery for many years, but ultimately gave it up to manage his family's fortune. He made major contributions to two museums in Greater Boston:

== Museum of Fine Arts Contributions ==
Weld is donated his the collection of Ernest Fenollosa for the Museum of Fine Arts, Boston. The museum contains one of the largest collections of Japanese art outside Japan, numbering over 100,000 objects.

In 1886, Weld attempted to sail around the world in his personal yacht. However, while moored in Yokohama, the yacht caught fire and was destroyed. As a result, Weld spent an extended amount of time with his Bostonian friends William Sturgis Bigelow and Ernest Fenollosa. The pair had already been in Japan for some time themselves, exploring the country and collecting art.

The Fenollosa-Weld Collection contains many of the most famous pieces in the Museum of Fine Arts' collection. Among them is a handscroll painting (emaki) depicting the 1159 Night Attack on the Sanjō Palace. Others are famous pieces by Sesshū, Kanō Eitoku, and Kanō Hōgai.

While Fenollosa and Bigelow developed very widespread and inclusive tastes in art during their time in Japan, Weld's interests remained somewhat narrowly focused. His primary interests in life were sport, boating, and martial activities such as archery. As a result, he became one of the first Americans to collect Japanese swords, spears, and other martial implements as art. In addition to full swords, Weld purchased many sword ornaments, handguards (tsuba), and other sword fittings such as kozuka, tiny blades tied to a swordhilt and used by the samurai for basic utilitarian tasks.

In 1911, the collections of Ernest Fenollosa and Charles G. Weld, much of it already physically in the Museum of Fine Arts, on loan indefinitely, became the property of the Museum, as the Fenollosa-Weld Collection.

== Peabody Essex Museum Contributions ==
Weld also made major contributions to the Peabody Essex Museum. Included among these are 110 photographs that premier American photographer Edward S. Curtis made for his 1905-1906 exhibit. Clark Worswick, curator of photography for the museum, describes them as:

"...Curtis' most carefully selected prints of what was then his life’s work...certainly these are some of the most glorious prints ever made in the history of the photographic medium. The fact that we have this man’s entire show of 1906 is one of the minor miracles of photography and museology."

The 14" by 17" prints are each unique and remain in pristine condition.

== Bibliography ==
- "A History of the Asiatic Department: A Series of Illustrated Lectures Given in 1957 by Kojiro Tomita (1890-1976)." Museum of Fine Arts, Boston, 1990.
