= William Fletcher Weld =

American philanthropist (1800–1881)

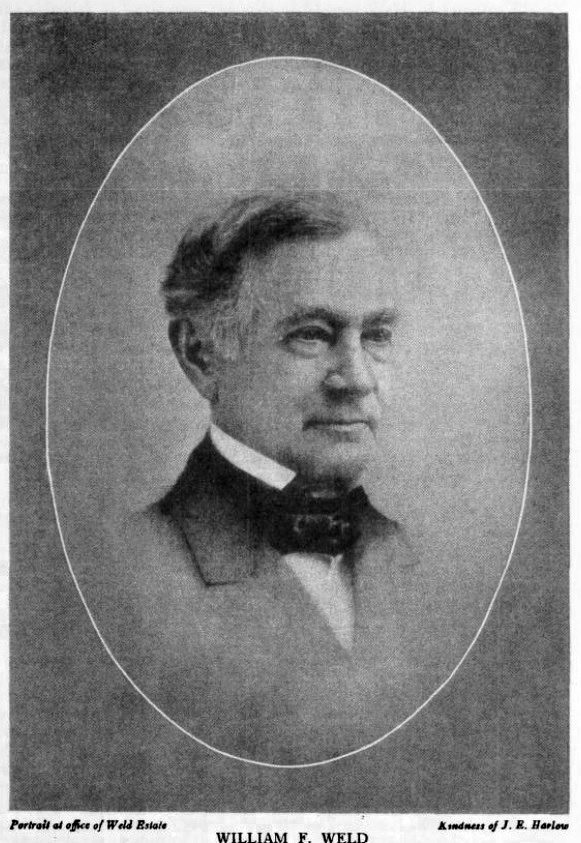
- Born: William Fletcher Weld; April 15, 1800; Roxbury, Boston, Massachusetts
- Died: December 12, 1881 (aged 81); Philadelphia, Pennsylvania
- Resting place: Forest Hill Cemetery
- Spouses: Mary Perez Bryant; Isabella Melissa Walker
- Children: with Bryant: William Gordon Weld (1827–1896), Mary Minot (1829-1853), Sarah (1831-1831), Sarah Minot (1832-after 1895), Frances Bryant (1834-1857), Anna Minot (1835-1924) with Walker: George Walker Weld (1840-1905)
- Parent(s): William Gordon Weld; Hannah Minot
- Relatives: George Richards Minot Weld (1803-1853), brother, Stephen Minot Weld (1806-1867), brother, Thomas Swan Weld (1810-1848), brother, Christopher Minot Weld (1812-1878), brother, Francis Minot Weld (1815-1886), brother, John Gardner Weld (1818-1876), brother
- Family: The Welds

William Fletcher Weld (April 15, 1800 – December 12, 1881) was an American shipping magnate during the Golden Age of Sail and a member of the prominent Weld family. He later invested in railroads and real estate. Weld multiplied his family's fortune into a huge legacy for his descendants and the public.

== Life ==
Weld was the eldest of seven sons and two daughters of William Gordon Weld, a prosperous ship master and ship owner, and his wife Hannah Minot. The Weld family dates back to William Weld, High Sheriff of London in 1352.

Weld planned to attend Harvard as his father had before him; however, during the War of 1812, a British frigate cruising off Boston Harbor captured one of the family's ships carrying a valuable cargo of wine and Spanish silver dollars. This financial disaster ended Weld's plans for Harvard. Instead, Weld became a clerk for an importer in Boston at age 15. By 22 he was in the dry-goods trade, but his partner's lack of business sense put the company in debt.

Weld eventually entered the shipping trade that had enriched his father. By 1833, Weld had made enough money to build Senator at Charlestown, the largest ship of that day.

Weld eventually became one of the most successful merchant ship owners in the United States. He operated 51 sailing vessels and 10 steamers. His fleet sailed under the name and symbol of the "Black Horse Flag". Upon his retirement in 1866, his partner, Richard Baker Jr. took over the business with Weld's two sons, William Gordon Weld and George Walker Weld.

As profits from the American shipping industry began to wane, he sold his fleet and turned to urban real estate and railroads, in particular, the Boston and Albany and Boston and Maine lines.

In July 1865, Weld offered to pay for his daughter Anna to take a trip to Europe to restore her health along with her half-brother George Walker Weld. He invited Louisa May Alcott to serve as her paid nurse and travel companion for the trip. Alcott took the offer but she never became close with the Welds.

Weld died in 1881 and was buried in Forest Hills Cemetery.

He was Unitarian in his religious belief and Republican in his politics.

== Legacy ==
Weld married twice. He married Mary Perez Bryant (1804-1836) in 1825. He fathering six children by his first wife. Weld also had one son by his second wife, Isabella Walker (1813-1908), whom he married in 1839. In 1906, his youngest son, George Walker Weld donated the Weld Boathouse to Harvard University.

William Fletcher Weld left an estate estimated at $20 million. His granddaughter Isabel Weld Perkins inherited $5 million of this at age 5. She later married diplomat Larz Anderson and left a legacy for the public that includes Larz Anderson Park and Larz Anderson Auto Museum in Brookline, Anderson Memorial Bridge in Cambridge, the Larz Anderson Bonsai Collection at Arnold Arboretum and Anderson House Museum in Washington, DC.

=== Weld Hall ===
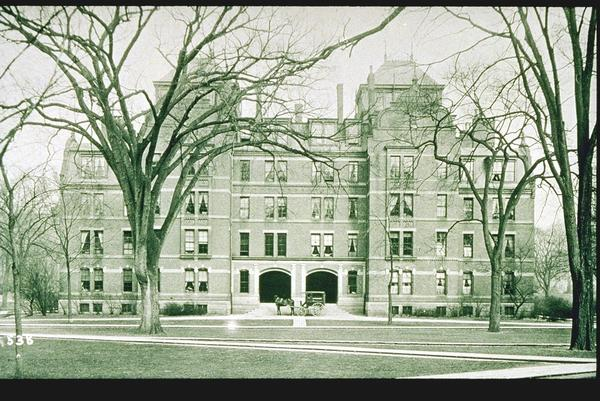
Weld Hall, Harvard Yard

In 1870, Weld donated money to Harvard for a dormitory to be built in memory of his younger brother, Stephen Minot Weld. This building was called "Weld Hall". Tours of Harvard Yard often pause near Weld Hall to note that John F. Kennedy lived there during his freshman year.
