= Charles Richard Weld =

English writer (1813–1869)

- Born: 1 August 1813; Windsor, England
- Died: 15 January 1869 (aged 55); Bellevue, New Bridge Hill, near Bath, England
- Education: Trinity College Dublin
- Occupations: Writer, historian, librarian
- Writing career
- Subjects: History of the Royal Society, travel literature, Arctic exploration

Charles Richard Weld (1813–1869) was an English writer, known as a historian of the Royal Society.

== Life ==
Born at Windsor in August 1813, he was the son of Isaac Weld (d. 1824) of Dublin, by his second marriage of 1812, to Lucy, only daughter of Eyre Powell of Great Connell, Kildare; he was therefore half-brother to Isaac Weld. In 1820 he accompanied his parents to France, where they occupied a château near Dijon. After his father's death he attended classes at Trinity College, Dublin, but took no degree.

In 1839 Weld went to London and became secretary to the Statistical Society. He studied at the Middle Temple and was called to the bar on 22 November 1844; but, advised by Sir John Barrow, he became in 1845 assistant secretary and librarian to the Royal Society, a post which he held for sixteen years. The senior secretary at the time was Peter Mark Roget, who encouraged Weld's historical work.

In 1861 he resigned his post at the Royal Society, and became a partner in the publishing business with Lovell Reeve. He was in charge of the philosophical department of the 1862 International Exhibition in London, and a district superintendent of the exhibition. He represented Great Britain at the Paris Exhibition of 1867.

Weld died suddenly at his residence (since 1865), Bellevue, New Bridge Hill, near Bath, on 15 January 1869. A portrait of Charles Richard Weld is prefixed to the posthumous ‘Notes on Burgundy’ which he was preparing for the press at the time of his death.

== Works ==
His best-known work, A History of the Royal Society with Memoirs of the Presidents, compiled from Authentic Documents (London), appeared in two volumes in 1848 . The book was illustrated by drawings made by Mrs. Weld, and was a supplement to the histories of Thomas Birch and Thomas Thomson. An appendix to the volumes, the Descriptive Catalogue of the Portraits in the possession of the Royal Society,’ compiled by Weld for the council in 1860.

Weld wrote a series of Vacation Tours. They were:

- ‘Auvergne, Piedmont, and Savoy; a Summer Ramble,’ (1850);
- ‘A Vacation Tour in the United States and Canada,’ (1854) dedicated to Isaac Weld, whose ‘Travels in North America’ had appeared in 1799;
- ‘A Vacation in Brittany’ (1856);
- ‘A Vacation in Ireland’ (1857);
- ‘The Pyrenees, West and East’ (1859);
- ‘Two Months in the Highlands, Orcadia and Skye’ (1860);
- ‘Last Winter in Rome’ (1865);
- ‘Florence the New Capital of Italy’ (1867); and
- ‘Notes on Burgundy,’ edited by his wife after his death in 1869.

Many of these books were illustrated by the author's own sketches.

Weld was the main assistant of Sir John Franklin in the organisation of his Arctic explorations, and was an authority on polar matters connected with the polar circle. He issued in 1850 a lecture on Arctic Expeditions, originally delivered at the London Institution on 6 February 1850, and this was followed by pamphlets on the search for Franklin during 1851.

His report on the Philosophical Instruments and Apparatus for Teaching Science for the Exposition Universelle was printed, and then abridged for the Illustrated London News (5 October 1867).

== Family ==
In 1842 he married Anne, daughter of Henry Selwood and niece of Sir John Franklin; her elder sister, Emily, married Alfred Tennyson, and her youngest sister, Louisa, married Charles Tennyson Turner. He was survived by a widow and a daughter, Agnes Grace Weld.
