= Porden =

Porden may refer to:

- Porden Islands, Nunavut, Canada
- Eleanor Anne Porden (1795-1825), British Romantic poet
- William Porden (c. 1755 – 1822), English architect
