= Thomas Weld =

Thomas Weld may refer to:

- Thomas Welde (1594/5–1661), first minister of the First Church of Roxbury, Massachusetts
- Thomas Weld (of Lulworth) (1750–1810), of Lulworth castle, Catholic philanthropist
- Thomas Weld (cardinal) (1773–1837), British Roman Catholic Cardinal
