= Edward Weld =

English recusant landowner

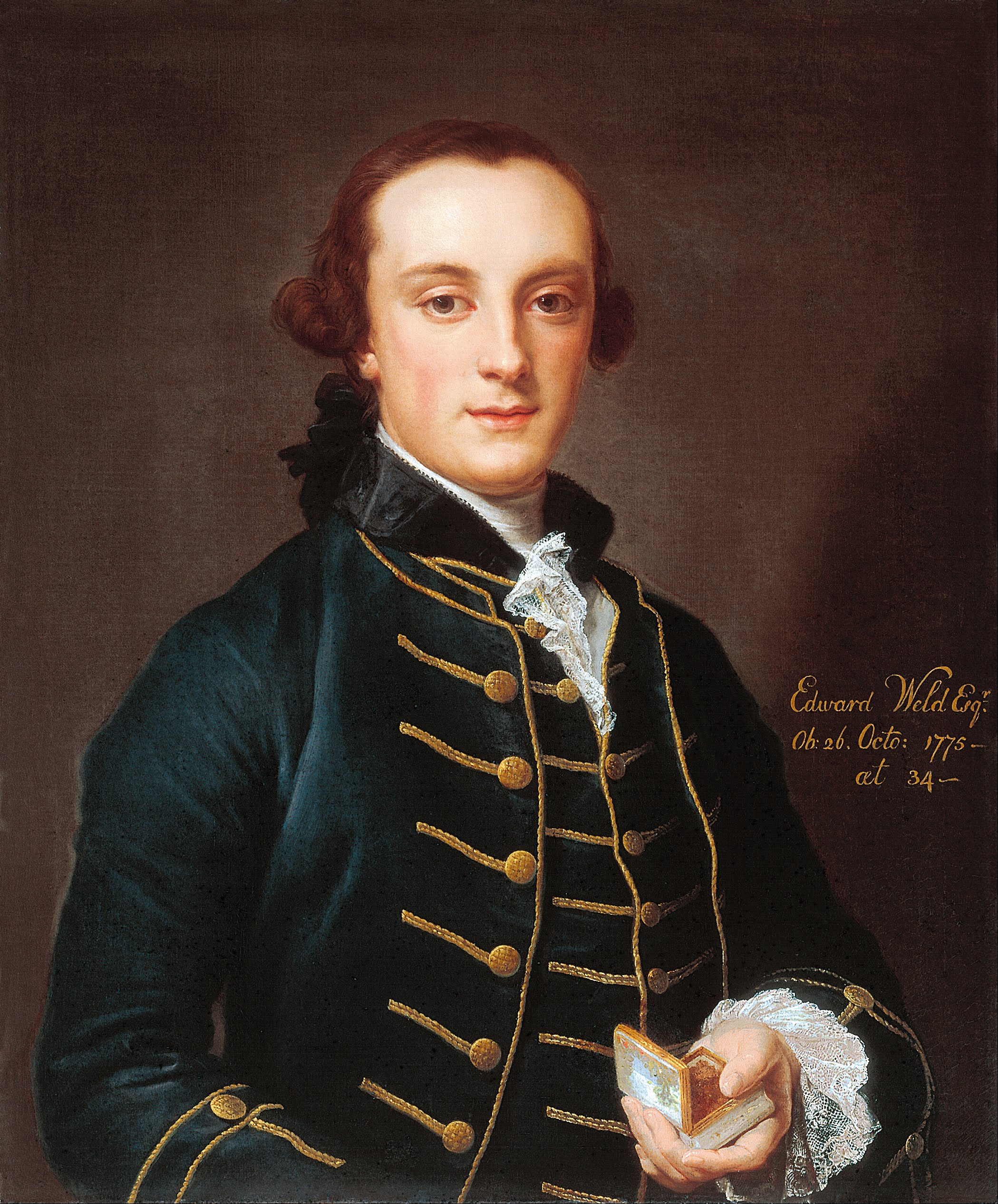
Edward Weld (1741–1775) by Pompeo Batoni

Edward Weld (1740–1775) was a British recusant landowner.

== Biography ==
Edward Weld was the eldest of the four sons and one daughter of Edward Weld (1705–1761) and his second wife, Dame Maria née Vaughan. He was heir to the enormous Lulworth Estate with its magnificent Jurassic coastline and its castle in the county of Dorset, England and to other estates. He was a member of the well connected notable recusant family and one of the wealthiest people in the kingdom. As was usual for the sons of Catholic gentry at that time, Edward and his younger brother, John, were sent to be educated abroad. While away, their mother died in 1754. They had been despatched at around the age of nine into the hands of British Jesuit preceptors at Watten in the Austrian Netherlands and thence to St Omer. There, in 1759, Edward's brother, John fell ill and died, probably in September. At age twenty, having concluded his education, Edward prepared for the Grand Tour by honing the manners of a young gentleman at the Jesuit house in Rheims and a stay at the court of the former Polish King Stanislaw Leszczynski in Lorraine. On his return to England, he had been orphaned by his father, Edward Sr., and as his heir had become immensely rich and was eligible for the hand of a suitable lady.

He was widowed after his first marriage in 1763 to Juliana Petre, daughter of Robert James Petre, 8th Baron Petre, who died in 1772. In 1775, he married the impecunious Maria Smythe, sixteen years his junior, and became her little-known first husband. Three months after the wedding, he fell off his horse and died of his injuries, before having had time to sign his new will. As there was no issue from either marriage, the estate passed to his surviving younger brother, nine years his junior, Thomas.

Meanwhile, his widow, was left without provision and soon married Thomas Fitzherbert of Swynnerton. Before long, he too died in 1781 but left her well provided for and known to history as "Mrs Fitzherbert". She went on to contract a morganatic marriage in 1785 with the Prince of Wales, the future George IV.

== The trials of his widow ==
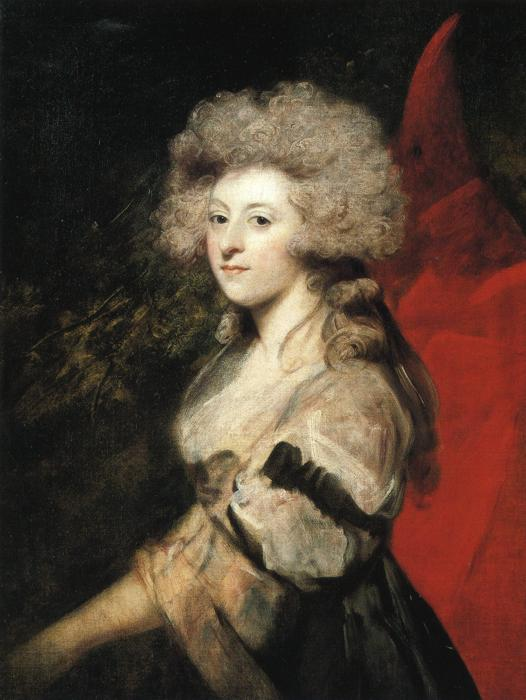
Portrait of Maria Fitzherbert, Edward's widow, by Joshua Reynolds, 1788

The short-lived connection to Edward, and his youngest brother Thomas Weld, emerged later in his widow Maria's life when she faced implacable opposition regarding the validity of her third marriage, that is, to the Prince of Wales. It came in the person of Lord William Stourton, who was anyway related to her through their mothers, but William and Maria were also related by marriage, William's wife, Catherine Winifred Weld was a niece of Maria's first husband, Edward, and, William's sister the Hon. Charlotte Mary Stourton was married to Catherine Winifred Weld's brother, Joseph Weld. They were always on friendly terms, and she came to place great trust in him. She appointed William one of the executors of her will, and to act for her as her agent in business generally, in her last years. He was also one of her trustees who acted for her in regard to the destruction of her private papers and was a witness on the occasion, 24 August 1833, when she permitted the Arthur Wellesley, 1st Duke of Wellington to burn a hoard of her private papers concerning her secret (catholic) marriage to George IV. At her special entreaty a number of documents which she particularly valued, including her marriage certificate, were deposited in Coutts Bank, sealed and witnessed by Stourton.

Moreover, Mrs Fitzherbert dictated to Lord Stourton her memoir which he preserved. It contains invaluable evidence about her marriage to the future George IV, and of their years together. On the subject of whether there were any children of the marriage she remained reticent as this would have had enormous repercussions on the Royal Succession. Stourton, who attributed her reticence to "natural delicacy" apparently believed that she was implying that there were no children. William at his death entrusted his brother Charles with the task of publishing the truth about the royal marriage. However, Charles was unable to obtain the documents deposited in Coutts Bank, but he used his brother's copy of Maria's memoir as the basis for his biography of Mrs. Fitzherbert, published in 1856. Her nephew-in-law from her marriage to Edward, Cardinal Weld, persuaded Pope Pius VII to declare the marriage to George sacramentally valid.

== Landholdings of Weld family ==
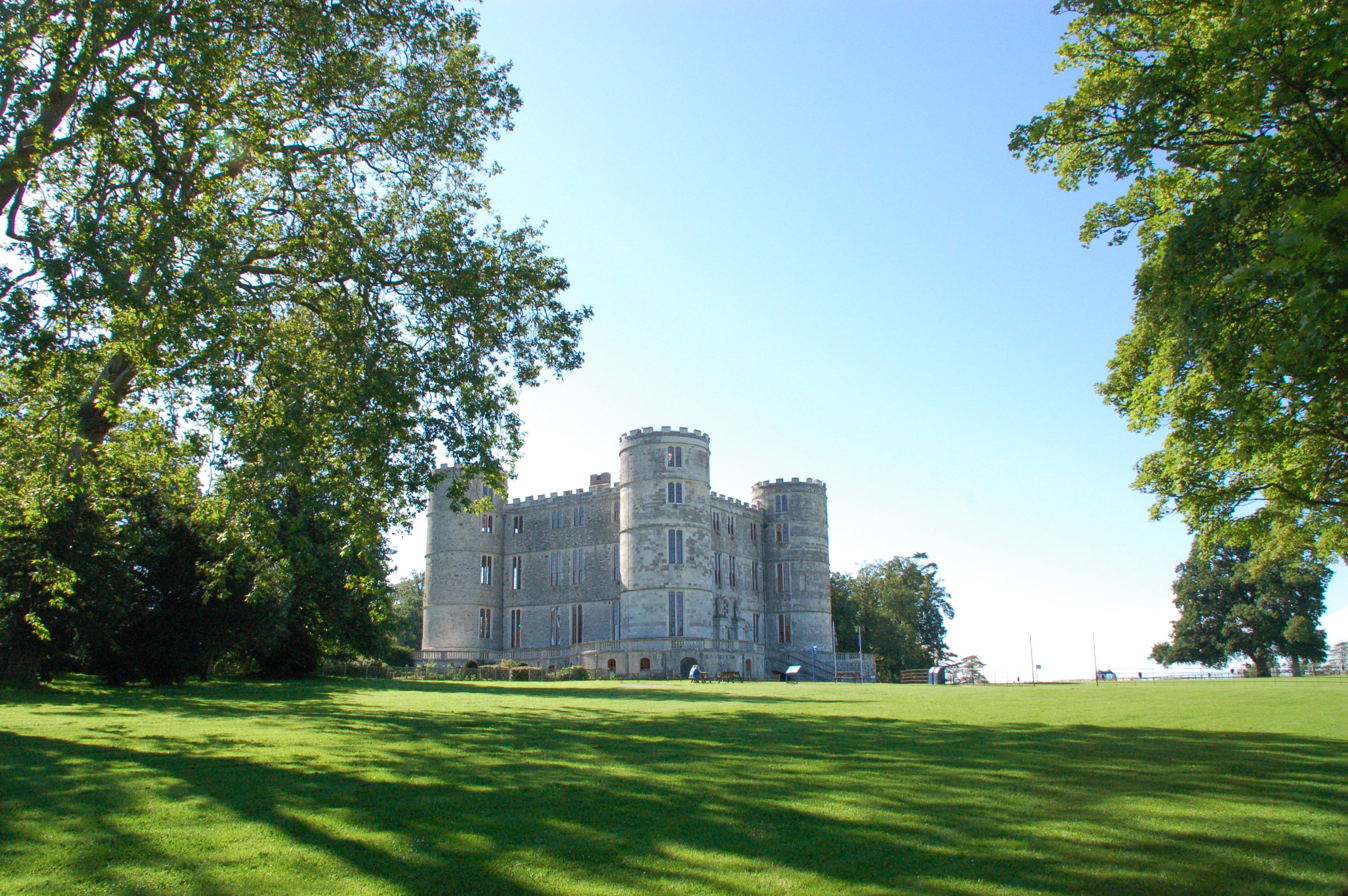
Lulworth Castle

Principal landholdings as of 1775:

- Lulworth,
- Lulworth Cove, Dorset
- Lulworth Castle, Dorset
- Holne, Devon
- Ilfracombe, Devon
- Compton Bassett, Wiltshire
- Boldre, Hampshire
- Chilworth, Hampshire
- Winkton, Hampshire
- Britwell, Oxfordshire
- Toddington, Bedfordshire
- Leagram, Lancashire
- Stonyhurst, Lancashire
- Aston, Staffordshire
- Pipe Ridware, Staffordshire

In 1801, Thomas, Edward's brother, bought Pylewell Park in Hampshire as a wedding gift for his son, Joseph. In 1837, Thomas, second son of Joseph, inherited Ince Blundell Hall on Merseyside from the last Blundell cousin.
