= William Stourton, 18th Baron Stourton =

English peer

Arms of Stourton: Sable, a bend or between six fountains

William Stourton, 18th Baron Stourton (1776–1846) was a Roman Catholic English peer. He is chiefly remembered for the private memoirs of his relative Maria Fitzherbert, the secret wife of King George IV, which she dictated to him, and which formed the basis for her first biography, published by his brother Charles Langdale in 1856.

== Family ==
He was the eldest son and successor of Charles Philip Stourton, 17th Baron Stourton; his mother was Mary Langdale, daughter of Marmaduke, 5th Baron Langdale (his brother Charles adopted their mother's surname). He was educated at the English College, Douai. In 1793 he left France with two brothers named Oliveira, all escorted by John Lingard, one of the professors at Douai. For nearly a year, Lingard was a tutor to young Stourton at his father's residence. Lingard later became a noted historian.

Like his brother Charles, he was deeply committed to the cause of Catholic Emancipation, and was one of the first Roman Catholic peers to take his seat in the House of Lords after the achievement of Emancipation.

He married Catherine Winifred Weld, daughter of Thomas Weld of Lulworth Castle and his wife Mary Stanley-Massey; they had six children. Catherine was the sister of Cardinal Thomas Weld, and a niece by marriage of Mrs. Fitzherbert. His sister, Charlotte Mary, married Joseph Weld, third son of Thomas Weld of Lulworth and his wife, Mary and succeeded to the Lulworth Estate.

William was succeeded as Baron by his eldest son Charles in 1846.

== Memoirs of Maria Fitzherbert ==
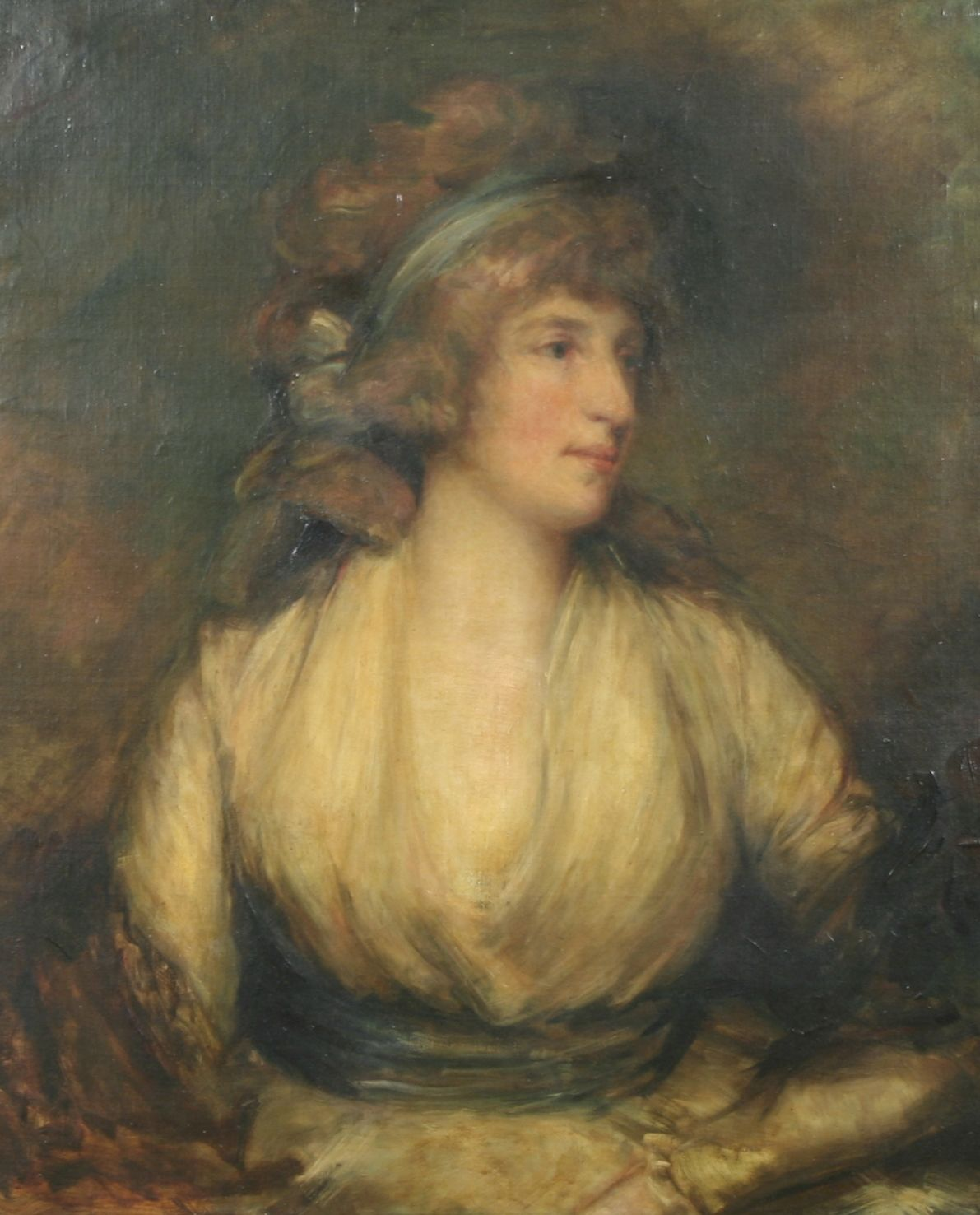
Maria Fitzherbert

William's mother, the Hon. Mary Langdale and Maria Fitzherbert were first cousins through their shared grandparents, Sir John Smythe, III Baronet of Acton Burnell, and his wife Constantia Blount who were themselves twelfth cousins, twice removed, by way of their shared ancestors, of Edward I of England and his second wife Margaret of France; William and Maria were also related by marriage, as mentioned above, William's wife, Catherine Winifred Weld was a niece of Mrs Fitzherbert's first husband, Edward Weld; also, William's sister, the Hon. Charlotte Mary Stourton, was married to Catherine Winifred Weld's brother, Joseph Weld. They were always on friendly terms, and she came to place great trust in him: she appointed him one of the executors of her will, and to act for her as her man of business generally, in her last years. Most crucially, he was one of her trustees who acted for her in regard to the destruction of her private papers. He was a witness on the celebrated occasion, 24 August 1833, when she permitted the Duke of Wellington to burn a horde of her private papers relating to her secret marriage to George IV. At her special request, a number of documents that she particularly valued, including her marriage certificate, were preserved and deposited in Coutts Bank, sealed and witnessed by Stourton.

Quite separate from these papers was the memoir which Mrs Fitzherbert dictated to Lord Stourton, and which he preserved. This contains invaluable evidence about her marriage to the future George IV, and of their years together. On one crucial and much-debated subject- whether there were any children of the marriage- she remained reticent. Stourton, who attributed her reticence to "natural delicacy" apparently believed that she was implying that there were no children.

Soon after Mrs. Fitzherbert's death, Stourton took great offence at the publication of the Memoirs of Lord Holland, which claimed that she had never regarded herself as more than a royal mistress. Stourton appealed to the Duke of Wellington to release the crucial documents, including the certificate which proved that a marriage had taken place, and which were still in Coutts Bank (although the marriage violated the Royal Marriages Act 1772, the certificate would show that Mrs Fitzherbert was, according to the laws of her own Church, lawfully married). The Duke, acting on the wishes of Queen Victoria, who detested any reminder of the Fitzherbert marriage, refused. The conscientious Stourton made several further appeals, but the Duke remained implacable. William at his death entrusted his brother Charles with the task of publishing the truth about the royal marriage. Charles was unable to obtain the documents deposited in Coutts Bank, but he used his brother's memoir as the basis for his biography of Mrs. Fitzherbert, published in 1856.

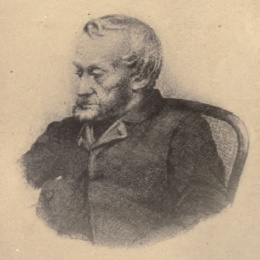
Charles Langdale, Lord Stourton's younger brother

== Notes ==
Peerage of England
Preceded by Charles Philip Stourton	Baron Stourton; 1816–1846	Succeeded by Charles Stourton
