= Steine House =

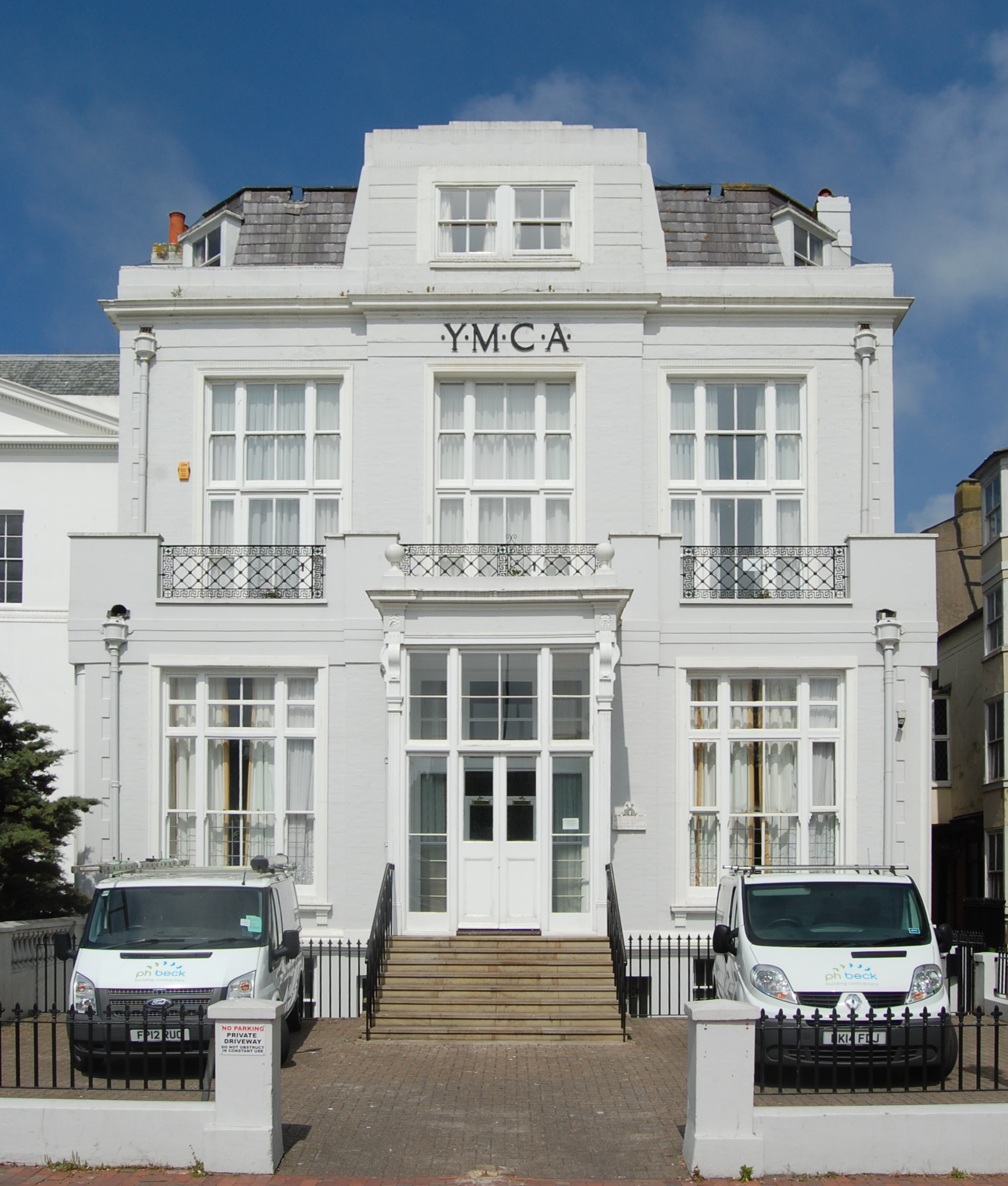
- The building from the east in 2018

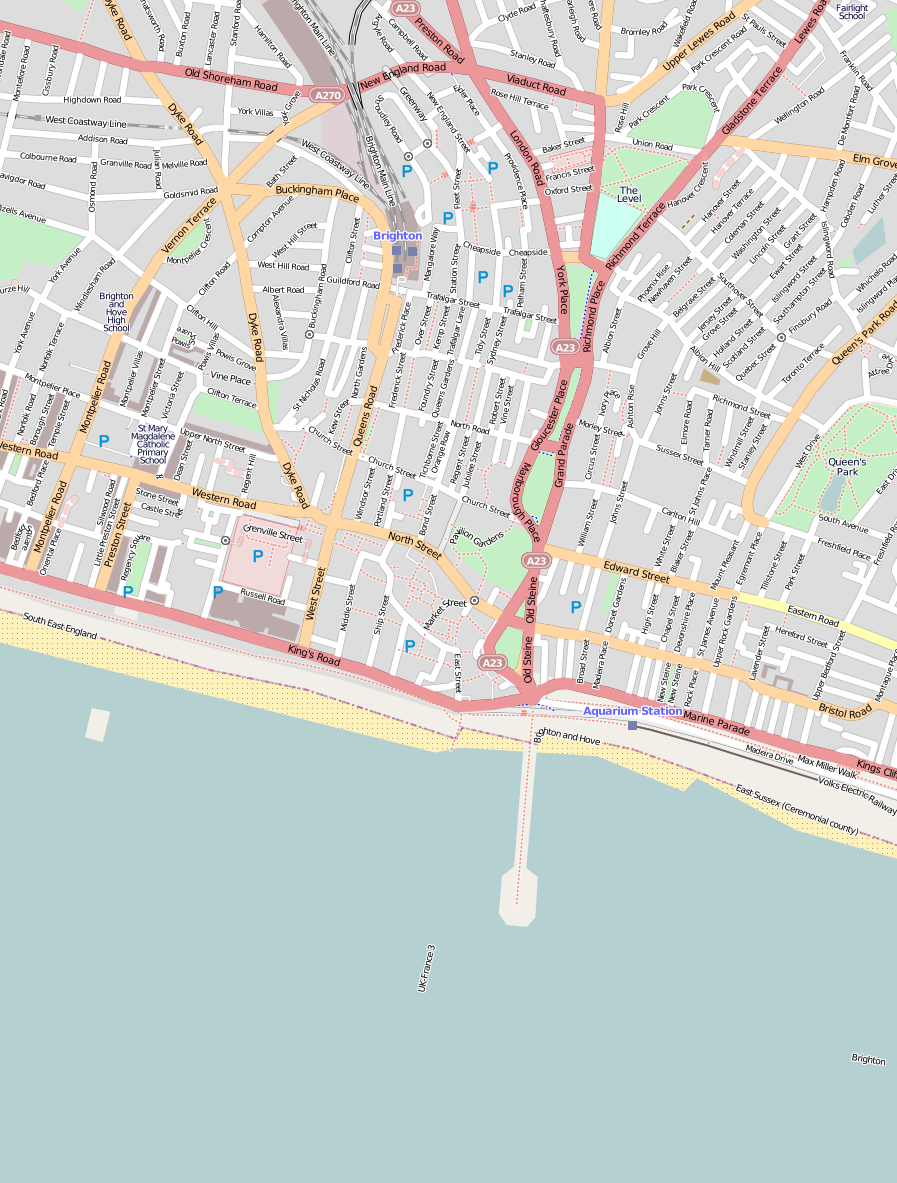
- Location within central Brighton
- 50.8212°N 0.1384°W
- Location: 55 Old Steine, Brighton, Brighton and Hove, East Sussex BN1 1NX, United Kingdom

History
- Built: 1804
- Built for: Maria Fitzherbert

Site notes
- Architect: William Porden

Listed Building – Grade II
- Official name: Steine House and attached walls, piers and railings, 55 Old Steine
- Designated: 13 October 1952
- Reference no.: 1380672

Steine House is the former residence of Maria Fitzherbert, first wife of the Prince Regent, in the centre of Brighton, part of the English city of Brighton and Hove. The building is now owned and used by Brighton YMCA.

Designed in 1804 by William Porden, who was the architect of many buildings on the Prince's Royal Pavilion estate and notably of the Royal Pavilion gardens, it was used by Fitzherbert until her death 33 years later. Porden's designs of Steine House were exhibited at the Royal Academy at the time, together with the designs of the Royal Pavilion. In 1870, Brighton YMCA was founded and started to provide accommodation from Steine House for single people such as servicemen and apprentices. In 1884, Brighton YMCA bought the building outright and continue to use it to this day.

An accidental fire in 2009 caused extensive damage, but Steine House was renovated and its purpose, to house formerly homeless people, maintained. Since 2012, the organisation's Registered Office is at Steine House, whilst a separate part of the building offers self-contained housing to 12 clients with support needs.

Alterations to the building have reduced its architectural importance, but Steine House has been listed at Grade II by English Heritage for its historical connections.

== History ==
The Prince Regent (later King George IV) was one of the earliest and most important regular visitors to Brighton in its early years as a resort. It was transformed from a small fishing village after about 1750 when sea-bathing and drinking seawater became fashionable and popular, on the advice of influential local doctor Richard Russell. The Prince's first visit to the town, in 1783 at the age of 21, lasted 11 days and attracted thousands of people eager to see both him and the sights which had attracted him. The following year, he stayed for ten weeks of the summer to take the water cure. He visited again in 1785—the same year as he met and fell in love with Maria Fitzherbert, a widowed Roman Catholic. They married (illegally, against the provisions of the Royal Marriages Act 1772) in December 1785, and she first visited Brighton the following year. At first, she stayed in a house whose site is believed to be near the present North Gate of the Royal Pavilion; a terrace of nine houses, Marlborough Row, existed there until 1820, when all but one were demolished when the Royal Pavilion estate was redeveloped. (The surviving house, number 8, is now called North Gate House and stands alongside the North Gate.) Even when the Royal Pavilion, the Prince's Brighton residence, was completed in 1787, the couple never stayed in the same house together. Under pressure to undertake a legal marriage to produce an heir, they divorced in 1794 and the Prince married Caroline of Brunswick; but they soon separated, and in June 1800 Mrs Fitzherbert and the Prince were reunited.

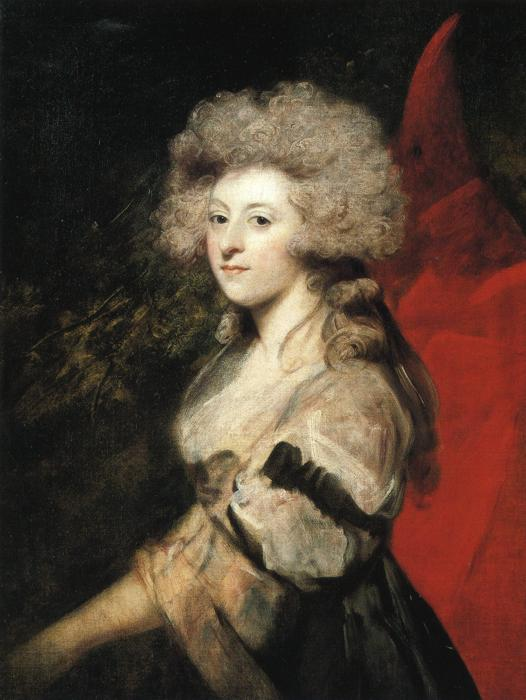
Portrait of Maria Fitzherbert by Sir Joshua Reynolds. Maria Fitzherbert lived at Steine House from 1804 until 1837.

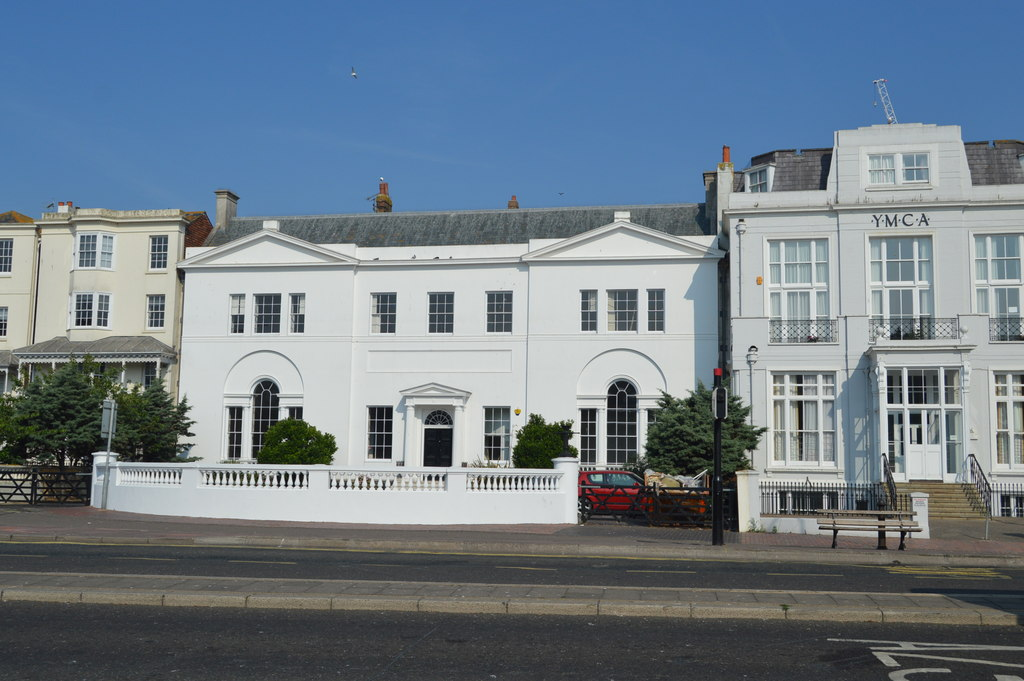
The house located next to the neoclassical Marlborough House.

The royal couple sought a site for a permanent home for Mrs Fitzherbert, and in 1804 she commissioned the Prince's favoured architect William Porden to design and build a house on the west side of Old Steine, next to Marlborough House, to replace a Mr Tuppen's lodging house. His design included a large colonnade across the front in an Egyptian style; this only lasted until the next year, when a storm destroyed it. He redesigned the façade in the Italianate style instead, with verandahs on both storeys. Maria Fitzherbert lived at Steine House until her death on 27 March 1837, after which she was buried at St John the Baptist's Church, Brighton's oldest surviving Roman Catholic church. Throughout her life in Brighton, she was treated extremely well by high society (statesman and writer John Wilson Croker remarked that "one reason why she may like this place is that she is treated as queen, at least of Brighton"), and for the first few decades of the 19th century Steine House was the second most important house in Brighton after the Royal Pavilion.

Steine House passed through several private owners after 1837, and finally passed out of residential use in the early 1860s when William Forder, a judge, sold it. At this time, a blocked staircase was discovered leading down from the cellar; false rumours abounded that a secret tunnel had been built between the house and the Royal Pavilion, and that the staircase led to this tunnel. It is considered more likely that the stairs gave access to Brighton's sewer network. The building was converted into the Civil and United Services Club, a social club, which required major internal renovations; these were completed in 1864.

In 1884, the building was bought by Brighton YMCA. In 1927, they carried out a major reconstruction: the building was used as a hostel for vulnerable men, and more bedrooms were added; the exterior was rebuilt, removing the verandas and balconies; and all remaining internal features except a petal shaped coving in the second floor lounge were removed or altered.

Steine House survived an attempt in 1964 to demolish it and replace it with offices, shops and a showroom. It is still owned by Brighton YMCA, and hosts the organisation's Registered Office, whilst still offering housing in 12 newly developed flats. In July 2009, the building was badly damaged by fire, and its residents had to be temporarily rehoused; it was soon restored.

Steine House was listed at Grade II by English Heritage on 13 October 1952. This status is given to "nationally important buildings of special interest". As of February 2001, it was one of 1,124 Grade II-listed buildings and structures, and 1,218 listed buildings of all grades, in the city of Brighton and Hove. The listing has been granted on the basis of the building's historical worth.

== Architecture ==
The work done to Steine House in 1927 changed its original appearance. It now presents a façade of white-painted brick with some stucco work. The roof is modern and in the mansard style. The building has two storeys.

The façade, facing east on to Old Steine, was partly set forward during the 1927 work, and dates solely from that time. There are three straight-headed windows to the upper storey, and two flanking the entrance porch. The corners of the porch have pilasters topped with spheres. The ground-floor windows have small corbels underneath them and architraves above. The windows on the upper floor open out on to a balcony which is formed by the top of the projecting ground floor; this has four short piers with ironwork between them. The top floor is an attic with a single centrally placed dormer window.

Inside, partly surviving, but without its original walls, is Maria Fitzherbert's oval-shaped private chapel on the first floor. There is petal shaped coving in the second floor lounge. No other original interior features are still in place.

== See also ==
- Grade II listed buildings in Brighton and Hove: S
- Marlborough House (the house next door)
- Media related to Steine House at Wikimedia Commons

== Bibliography ==
- Antram, Nicholas; Morrice, Richard (2008). Brighton and Hove. Pevsner Architectural Guides. London: Yale University Press. ISBN 978-0-300-12661-7.
- Brighton Polytechnic. School of Architecture and Interior Design (1987). A Guide to the Buildings of Brighton. Macclesfield: McMillan Martin. ISBN 1-869865-03-0.
- Collis, Rose (2010). The New Encyclopaedia of Brighton. (based on the original by Tim Carder) (1st ed.). Brighton: Brighton & Hove Libraries. ISBN 978-0-9564664-0-2.
- Dale, Antony (1950). The History and Architecture of Brighton. Brighton: Bredin & Heginbothom Ltd.
- Dale, Antony; Gray, James S. (1976). Brighton Old and New. East Ardsley: EP Publishing. ISBN 0-7158-1188-6.
- Musgrave, Clifford (1981). Life in Brighton. Rochester: Rochester Press. ISBN 0-571-09285-3.
- Nairn, Ian; Pevsner, Nikolaus (1965). The Buildings of England: Sussex. Harmondsworth: Penguin Books. ISBN 0-14-071028-0.
