= Eye miniature =

Miniature paintings of eyes

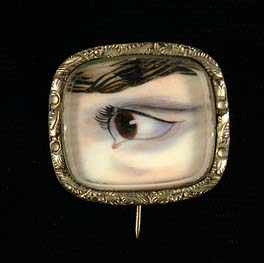
- Type: Watercolour on ivory

Eye miniatures or lovers' eyes were Georgian miniatures, normally watercolour on ivory, depicting the eye or eyes of a spouse, loved one or child. These were usually commissioned for sentimental reasons and were often worn as bracelets, brooches, pendants or rings with richly decorated frames, serving the same emotional need as lockets hiding portraits or locks of hair. This fad started in the late 1700s and miniaturists such as Richard Cosway and George Engleheart were responsible for some of the first pieces.

== History ==
External image
- Gallery The public domain review

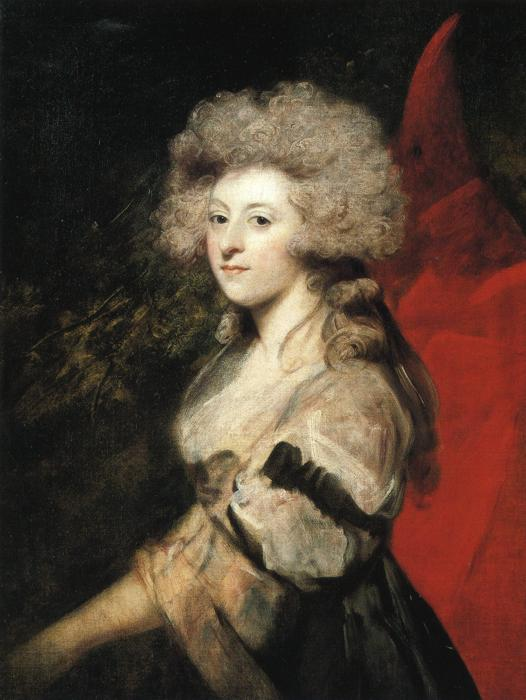
Portrait of Maria Fitzherbert by Sir Joshua Reynolds, circa 1788.

Eye miniatures are believed to have originated when the Prince of Wales (later George IV) felt the need to send the widow Maria Fitzherbert a token of his love. This gesture and the romance that went with it was frowned upon by the court, so a miniaturist was employed to paint only the eye and thereby preserve anonymity and decorum. The couple went through a form of marriage on 15 December 1785, though all present knew the marriage was invalid by the Royal Marriages Act, since George III had not approved. Reportedly Maria’s eye miniature was worn by George IV, hidden under his lapel. This is regarded as the event which led to lovers' eyes becoming fashionable, appearing between 1790 and the 1820s in the courts and affluent families of England, Russia, France and more rarely, America.

These portraits could also be found on various other trinkets, framed by precious stones on the lids of toothpick containers, snuffboxes and other small vessels. They would sometimes contain locks of hair gifted by the sitter to further accentuate the sentimentality of the piece. The hair could either be incorporated into the portrait itself or encased behind glass or crystal on the piece of jewellery.

The high prices fetched by these items has generated a thriving market in imitations.

A note in Lady Eleanor Butler's diary recorded the arrival of a young man who had made the Grand Tour, and had brought "an Eye, done in Paris and set in a ring – a true French idea."
