= Old Steine =

Street in Brighton

Coordinates: 50°49′14″N 0°08′15″W

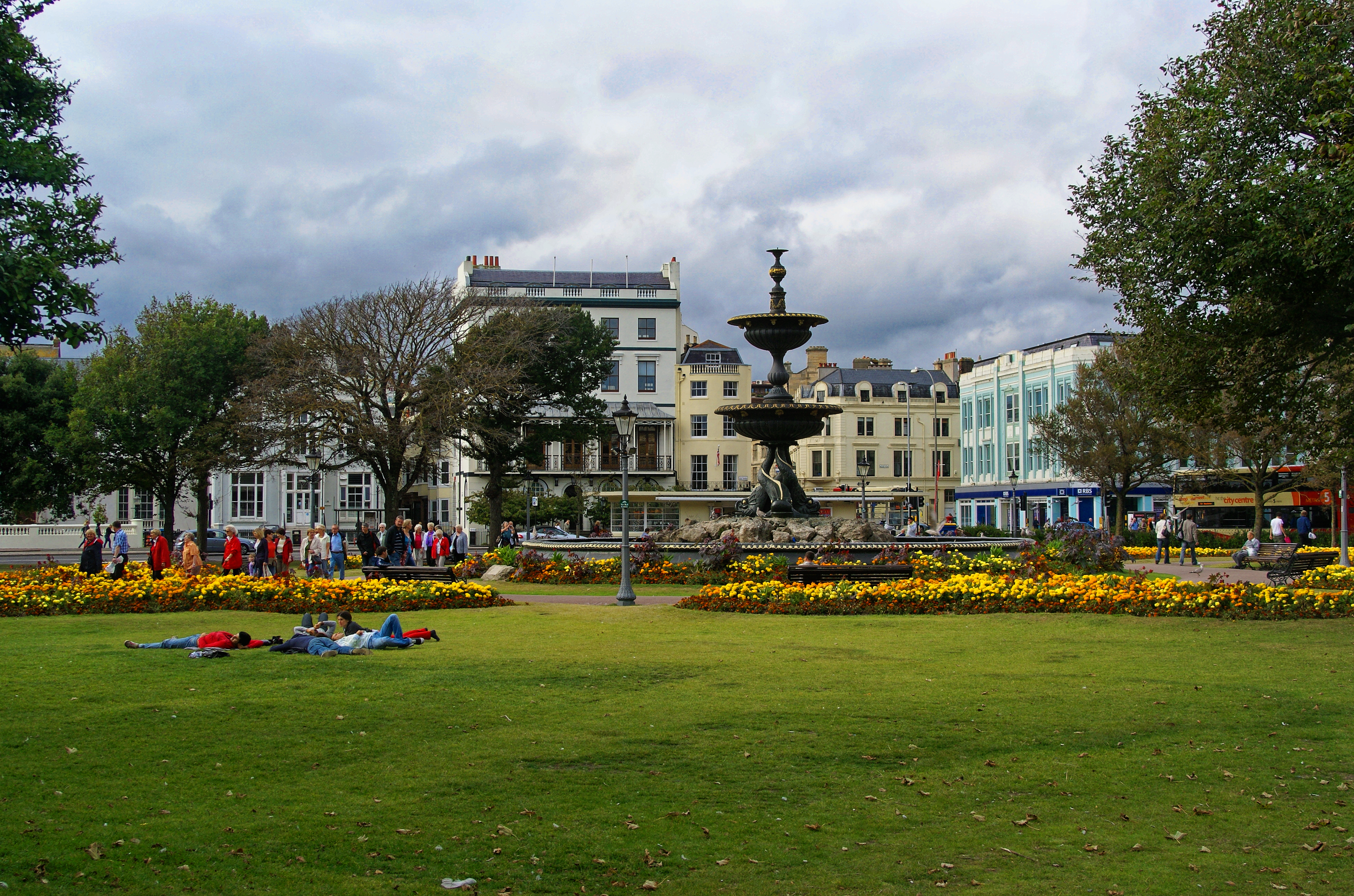
Northwest view of the Old Steine

The Old Steine (/ˈstiːn/) is a thoroughfare in Brighton city centre, East Sussex, and is the southern terminus of the A23. The southern end leads to Marine Parade, the Brighton seafront and the Palace Pier. The Old Steine is also the site of a number of City Centre bus stops for Brighton buses. The Royal Pavilion is located immediately to the north of the Old Steine.

== History ==
The Old Steine was originally an open green with a stream running adjacent to the easternmost dwellings of Brighthelmstone. The area was used by local fishermen to lay out and dry their nets. When Brighton started to become fashionable in the late 18th century, the area became the centre for visitors. Building around the area started in 1760, and railings started to appear around the green area in the 1770s, reducing its size. This continued throughout the 19th century. The eastern lawns of the Royal Pavilion were also originally part of the Old Steine.

Dr. Richard Russell, whose 1750 paper on the health benefits of sea water helped to popularise Brighton, had a house built on the Old Steine in 1759; the site is now occupied by the Royal Albion Hotel.

Maria Fitzherbert lived in Steine House on the west side of the Old Steine from 1804 until her death in 1837.

=== Etymology ===
The word Steine comes from the Old English stoene, meaning "stony place". The name is thought to come from the number of large sarsen stones which once lay in the area. Many of the stones can still be seen at the base of the Steine's Victoria Fountain, where they were placed when it was built in 1823.
