= St John the Baptist's Church, Brighton =

St John the Baptist, Brighton
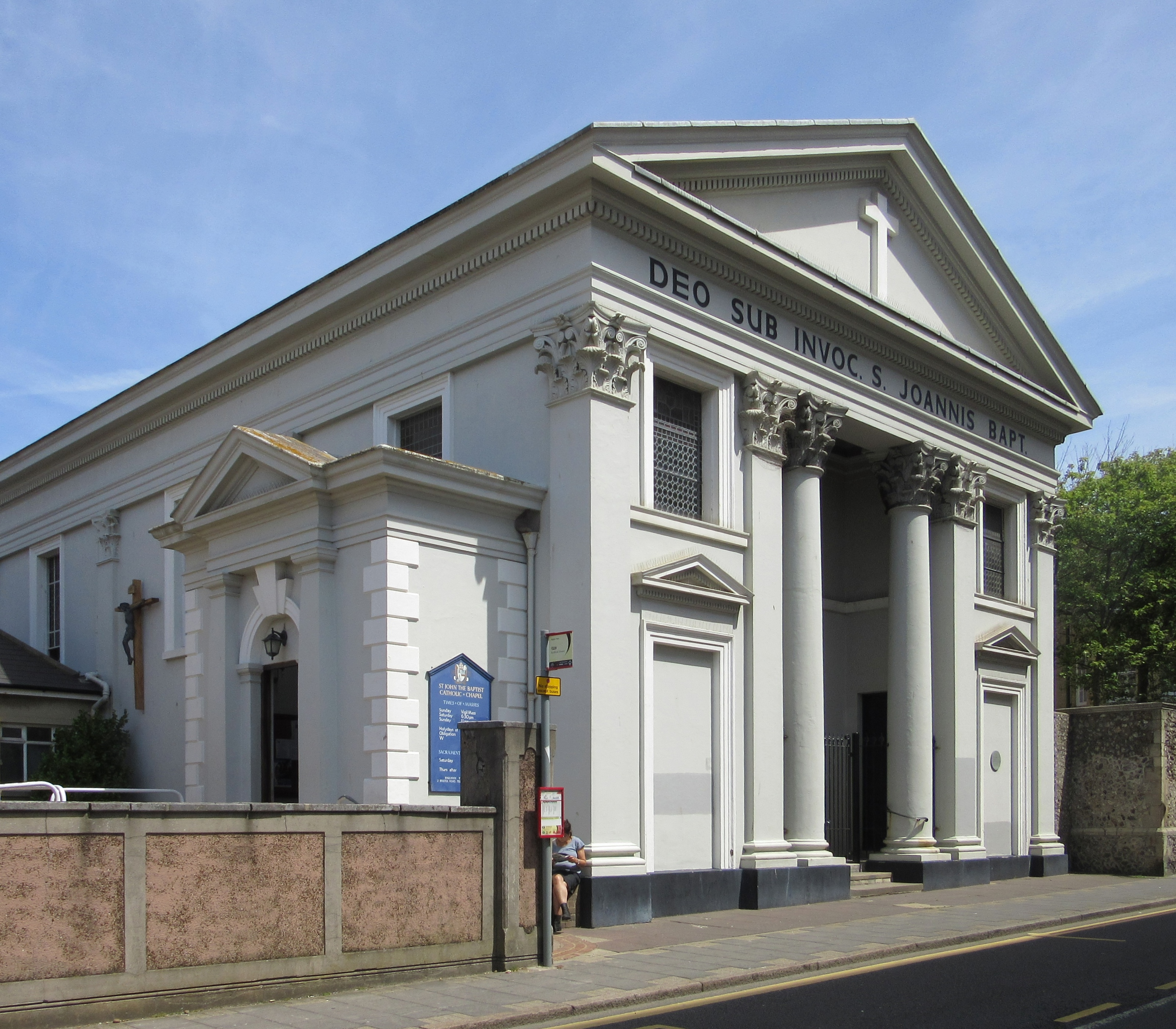
- St John the Baptist, Brighton
- 50.8194°N 0.1261°W
- Denomination: Roman Catholic

History
- Dedication: St John the Baptist

Administration
- Province: Southwark
- Diocese: Arundel and Brighton
- Deanery: Brighton
- Parish: St John the Baptist, Brighton

Clergy
- Priest: Revd David Foley

St John the Baptist's Church is a Roman Catholic church in the Kemptown area of the English city of Brighton and Hove. It was the first Roman Catholic church built in Brighton after the process of Catholic Emancipation in the early 19th century removed restrictions on Catholic worship. Located on Bristol Road, a main road east of the city centre, it is one of 11 Catholic churches in Brighton and Hove. The Classical-style building, which was funded by Maria Fitzherbert and completed in 1835, has been listed at Grade II* by English Heritage for its architectural and historical importance.

== History ==
Laws against Roman Catholic worship were in place in Britain until the early 19th century, although some restrictions were relaxed by the passing of Acts of Parliament in 1778 (the Papists Act) and 1791 (the Roman Catholic Relief Act). The 1791 Act allowed Catholic churches to be built for the first time, although there were restrictions on their design and appearance: no bells or steeples were allowed.

Brighton's Roman Catholic community at the time of the Relief Act was small, but two factors caused it to grow in the 1790s. Many refugees from the French Revolution settled in Brighton after escaping from France; and Maria Fitzherbert, a twice-widowed Catholic, began a relationship with the Prince Regent (and secretly married him in 1785 in a ceremony which was illegal according to the Act of Settlement 1701 and the Royal Marriages Act 1772). She accompanied the Prince Regent whenever he visited Brighton, and had her own house (Steine House on Old Steine).

The first Catholic place of worship in Brighton was established above a shop in 1798; it was one of the earliest in Britain. In 1805 the priest in charge, a French émigré, started to raise money for a permanent building; a site on High Street, east of the Royal Pavilion and Old Steine, was found, and the Classical-style church was completed in 1807. It was demolished in 1981.

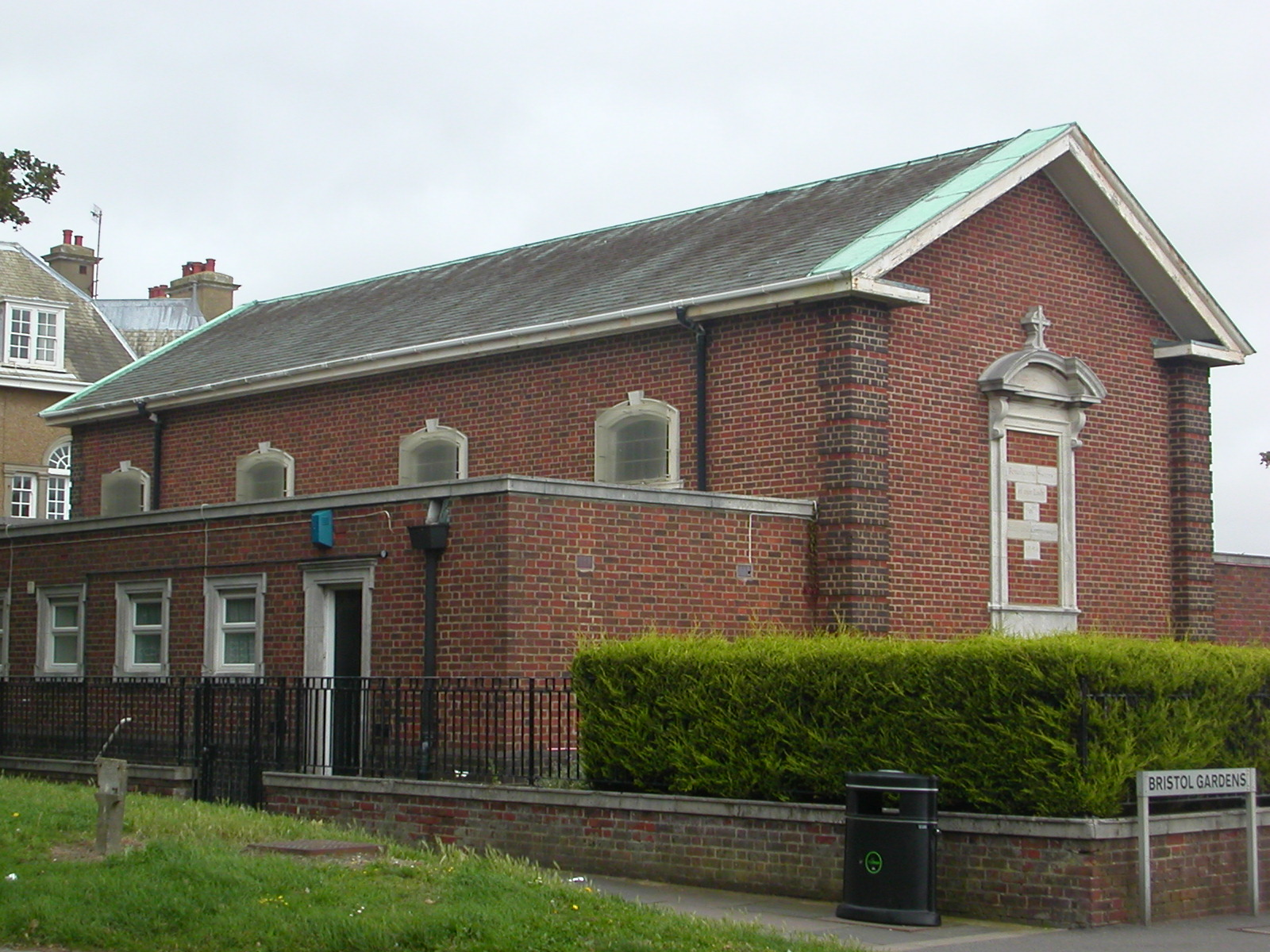
St Benedict's Chapel

In 1818 the new rector, a friend of Maria Fitzherbert, wanted to extend the church. Mrs Fitzherbert donated £1,000 for this purpose, but before any action could be taken the events of 1829, when Catholic emancipation was fully achieved, encouraged Brighton's Catholic community to seek a new site for a larger, more elaborate church. A piece of undeveloped land on the estate of the Marquess of Bristol was bought for £1,050, and William Hallett, later a mayor of Brighton, designed and built the new church of St John the Baptist. It was consecrated on 7 July 1835 and opened on 9 July 1835. Many of the 900 Catholic churches opened in England since the 1791 Roman Catholic Relief Act had not been consecrated by that stage, so St John the Baptist's was only the fourth new church to be consecrated in England since the Reformation in the 16th century.

Maria Fitzherbert died in 1837 and was buried at the church. A memorial stone and sculpture, showing her wearing three wedding rings, were placed in the nave. In the 1850s, a school bearing the church's name was opened and a Sisters of Mercy convent was built next to the church. A physical connection to the church was built in 1866. The church closed during 1875 while an extension was built on the eastern side, creating a new sanctuary and side chapels. The land cost £1,100, and construction work cost £2,000. It was reopened on 31 October 1875. More changes were made in 1887, with several new interior fittings added, although a proposed major remodelling and redesign, by S. J. Nicholl, during the same year was not carried out. The designs were displayed at the Royal Academy, however. The church has seen little change since then, although a set of 17th-century altar rails taken from a Belgian church were installed in 1957.

The church is licensed for worship in accordance with the Places of Worship Registration Act 1855 and has the registration number 8131.

The Benedictine Sisters of Our Lady of Grace and Compassion, a community of Benedictine nuns founded in 1954, were based at a chapel (St Benedict's) at the junction of Manor Road and Bristol Gardens. The community was within St John the Baptist's parish. The nuns left the convent in 2009 and demolition of the building was authorised in 2013.

== Architecture ==
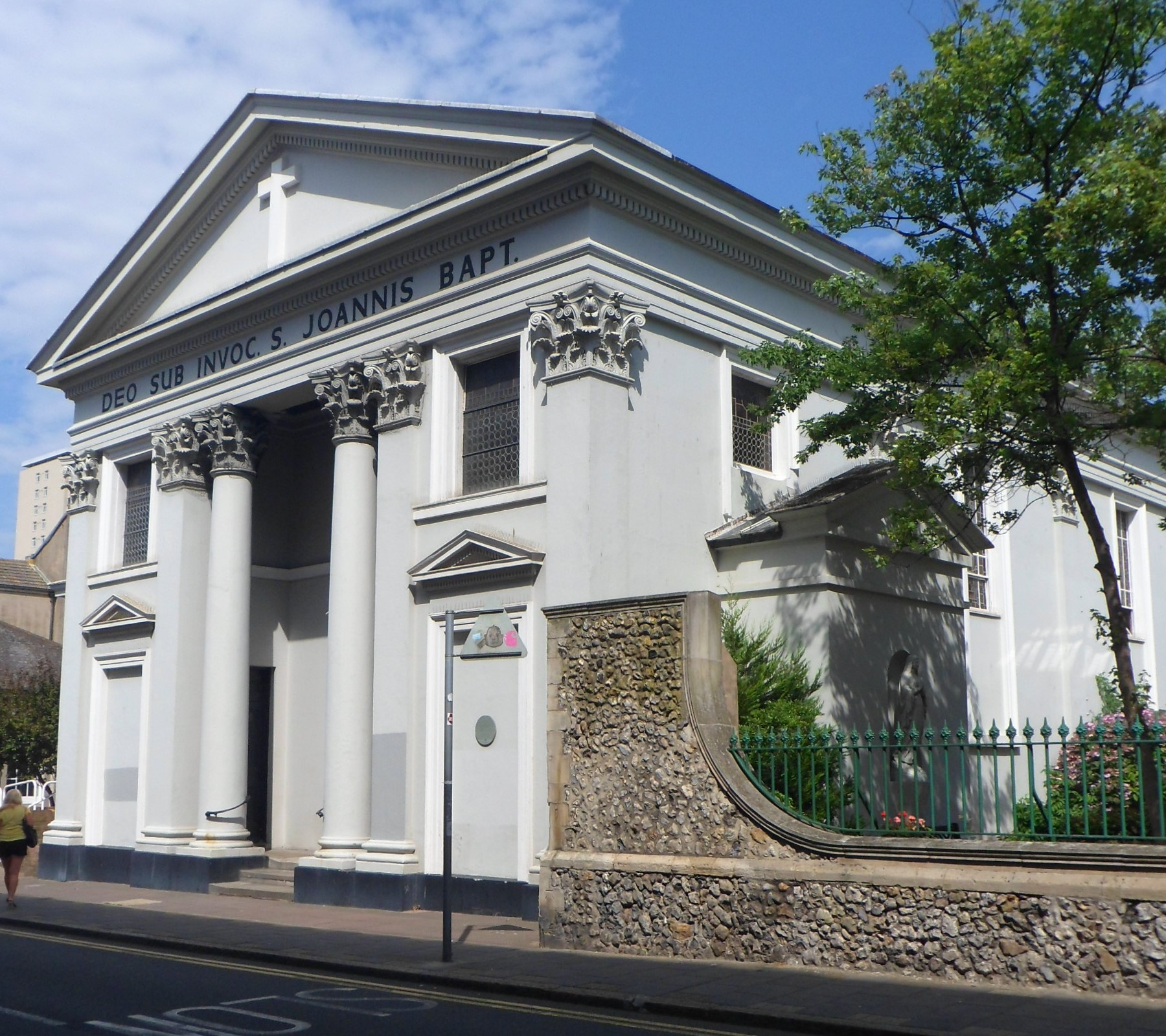
The southern and eastern faces, showing one of the side chapels added in 1875

William Hallett, the architect, is not known to have been responsible for any other buildings in Brighton or elsewhere, and he based the design of St John the Baptist's very closely on that of St Mary Moorfields in London, completed in 1820. In particular, the southern frontage – which faces Bristol Road – is almost identical to that of St Mary's. The church is Classical in style, with a stuccoed exterior and a large pediment above the entrance. The shallow roof is made of slate. The entrance porch is flanked by two columns with accompanying pilasters, and there are two more pilasters at the corner of the building. Blind doorways between the two sets of pilasters have small pediments and two deep-set windows above them. Below the main pediment and dentil cornice is a Latin inscription: DEO SUB INVOC. S. JOANNIS BAPT. ("To God, under the invocation of St. John the Baptist.") There is a side entrance in the western face, again with a pediment above it.

== The church today ==
St John the Baptist Catholic School moved away from its original site next to the church in 1989, when a new building was provided on Whitehawk Hill. The convent chapel is now used as a rest home, although its origins as a chapel are still apparent. The church holds Masses on Saturday evenings, Sunday mornings and Holy Days of Obligation.

The church has been listed at Grade II* since 13 October 1952. As of February 2001, it was one of 70 Grade II*-listed buildings and structures, and 1,218 listed buildings of all grades, in the city of Brighton and Hove.

== See also ==
- Grade II* listed buildings in Brighton and Hove
- List of places of worship in Brighton and Hove

== Bibliography ==
- Dale, Antony (1989). Brighton Churches. London: Routledge. ISBN 0-415-00863-8.
