= Thomas Weld (of Lulworth) =

English Catholic gentleman of the Enlightenment

Thomas Bartholomew Weld
- Born: 24 August 1750; Lulworth Castle, Dorset
- Died: 1810 (aged 59–60); Stonyhurst College, Lancashire
- Burial place: Lulworth Castle Chapel, Purbeck District, Dorset
- Occupations: Landowner, philanthropist and book collector
- Known for: Rare books collection, Philanthropy: Stonyhurst College, Stonyhurst Saint Mary's Hall
- Family: Thomas Weld, Edward WeldJr., Maria Fitzherbert, Weld-Blundell family

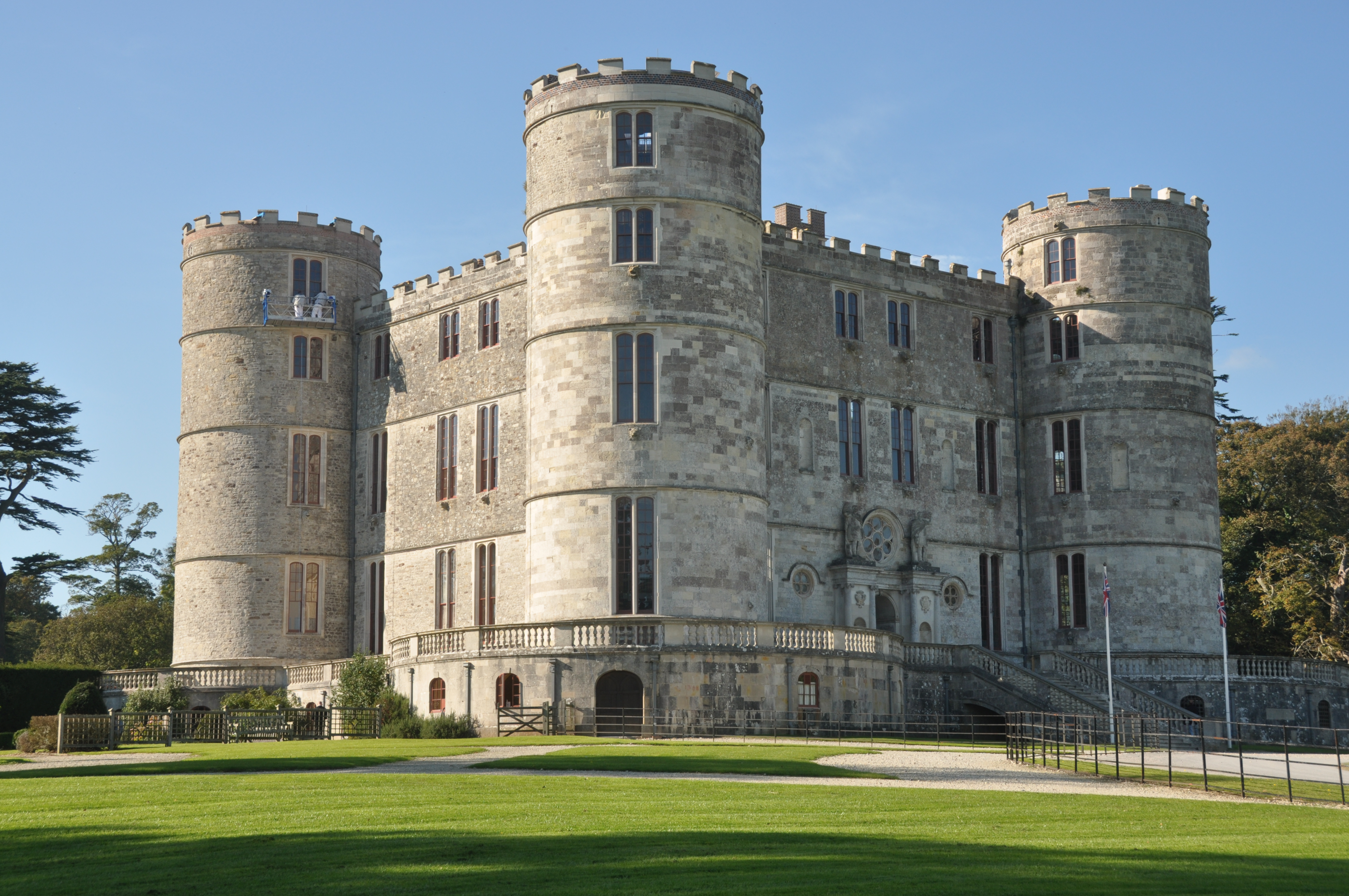
Lulworth Castle, Dorset, England

Thomas Bartholomew Weld (1750–1810), known as Thomas Weld of Lulworth Castle, was a member of the English Catholic gentry, landowner, philanthropist and bibliophile. He was connected to many of the leading Catholic families of the land, such as the Bodenhams, Cliffords, Erringtons, Petres and Stourtons.

Weld was a benefactor of the Society of Jesus in England in their educational and pastoral endeavours, as timely donor of his Stonyhurst estate in 1794. He was also a benefactor to other Roman Catholic religious and clergy. He was a personal friend of King George III. His sister-in-law was Maria Fitzherbert. After the French Revolution he hosted refugee remnants of the French royal family at his castle. He was the builder, in 1786, of the first Roman Catholic place of worship in England after the Protestant Reformation.

== Life ==
Thomas Weld was born into an old recusant family descended from Sir Humphrey Weld, a grocer, who was elected Lord Mayor of London in 1608. He was the fourth son of Edward Weld and Dame Mary Teresa, née Vaughan of the Welsh Bicknor exclave in Herefordshire. Two of his older brothers and both his parents died when he was still a child. At age six in 1761, on the death of his father, Weld inherited the Bowland-with-Leagram and Stonyhurst estates in Lancashire from his father's cousin, Maria Shireburn (died 1754), the independently wealthy widow of Thomas Howard, 8th Duke of Norfolk (1683-1732).

After home schooling, he was sent to the English Jesuit school at Watten and Bruges in Northern France and Austrian Netherlands. He was reputedly not a distinguished scholar, due to repeated disruptions of his schooling from local political turmoil, but he developed an attachment to the community he met there and it fostered his lasting interest in education. On return to England, he married Mary Stanley-Massey-Stanley daughter of Sir John Stanley-Massey-Stanley, 6th Baronet (1711–1794). They had six daughters and nine sons, the eldest of whom was also Thomas, who after being widowed and left with a daughter, entered the church and rose to the status of cardinal.

His older brother, Edward, died in a horse-riding accident three months after his marriage to Maria Smythe (later, Mrs Fitzherbert) in July 1775. Edward had not yet signed a new will reflecting his marriage, and the entire family inheritance fell to Thomas, who did not provide any support for his sister-in-law, forcing her to promptly remarry. Maria married Thomas Fitzherbert in 1778, who also died prematurely in 1781. She was introduced to the Prince of Wales, the future George IV and they contracted a morganatic marriage in 1785, which was repudiated both by the king and the Privy Council of England. Subsequently, William Stourton, 18th Baron Stourton, one of Weld's sons-in-law, became executor of Maria's will and fought hard to prove the validity of her marriage to the Prince of Wales, but met implacable opposition from Queen Victoria in the shape of the Duke of Wellington.

=== Bibliophile landowner ===
Bookplate in the Luttrell Psalter showing crest and ownership of Thomas Weld. British Library

As the new owner of Lulworth Castle and the Lulworth Estate, Thomas Weld, who until then had been living with his wife in Britwell in Oxfordshire, refurbished the interiors of the "castle" in the then fashionable Adam style. It is said the most sumptuous was the library indicating he was a keen bibliophile who possessed a number of exceptional rarities in his collection, including the Luttrell Psalter, and Shakespeare's history textbook, Holinshed's Chronicles 1587 2nd edition. Thomas Weld's ex libris bookplates all bear the family motto on the plates' ribbon "nil sine numine". Weld is known to have collected artworks. He was a friend of another Jesuit school alumnus, Giles Hussey (1710-1788), a Dorset artist specialising in portraiture and depictions of Charles Edward Stuart. Two pencil drawings of Thomas and his wife Mary are known to have survived.

Although the "Castle", originally intended as a hunting lodge, fell victim to a disastrous fire in 1929, a number of valuable items it housed appear to have been saved. Unless it had been sold prior to the fire, one of them would have been Engelbert Kaempfer's History of Japan, translated from the German manuscript held by Sir Hans Sloane and published in 1728.

=== Builder ===
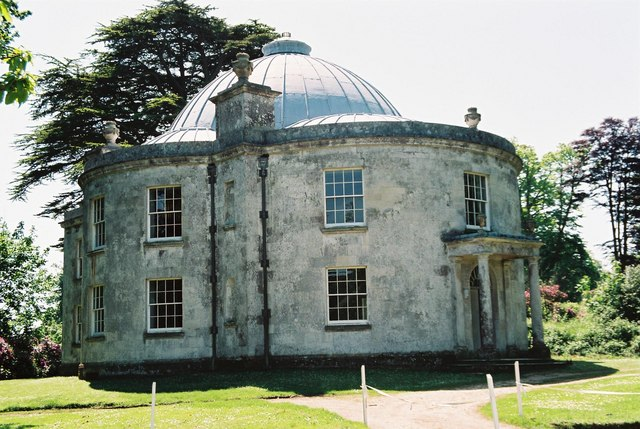
Grade I listed RC Chapel of St Mary, built to look like a house, 1786

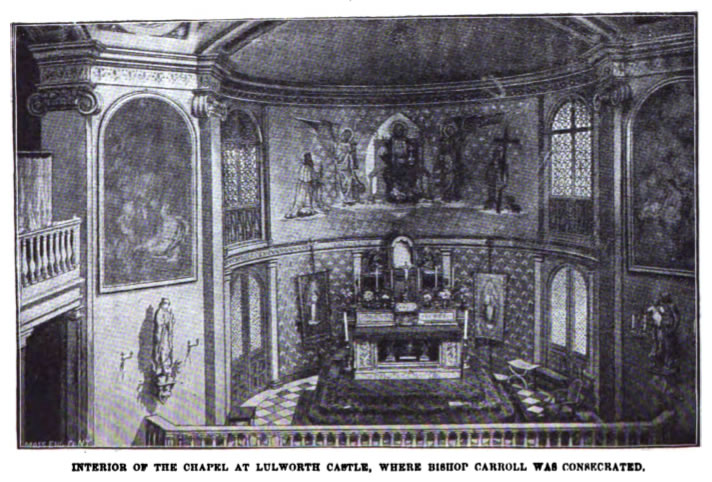
Interior of St Mary's Chapel, Lulworth Castle

In the absence of public catholic worship, the Welds were accustomed to having services celebrated by a personal chaplain in a chapel space within the castle. One of these came to them fleeing the French Revolution. He was a French ordained Jesuit priest, named Jean Grou, who as well as fulfilling his pastoral duties, was a prolific writer on spiritual matters. He stayed at Lulworth for almost a decade, until his death in 1803.

Owing to his personal friendship with King George III, Thomas Weld was able in 1786 to build a Roman Catholic church dedicated to St. Mary to serve as the family chapel in the grounds of Lulworth Castle. Pevsner relates that he needed permission from the King which he obtained on condition it did not look like a church from outside. He asked John Tasker who was responsible for the interior refurbishment of the castle, to design it drawing inspiration from a classical Greek mausoleum, at a cost of £2,380. It was to be the first Roman Catholic chapel to be erected since the time of the Protestant Reformation. It was indeed to be his and his wife's final resting place. The building has been Grade I listed.

On August 15, 1790, John Carroll, an American Jesuit friend of Thomas, was consecrated bishop by Bishop Charles Walmesley, assisted by another school friend and personal chaplain, the Jesuit, Charles Plowden, in the chapel of Lulworth Castle. Carroll was later to become the first Roman Catholic archbishop of Baltimore. The next episcopal consecration took place there on 19 December of the same year when John Douglass was consecrated bishop of The London District (which included the home counties, the West Indies with the exception of Trinidad, and the Channel Islands of Jersey and Guernsey) by William Gibson, titular bishop of Acanthus, and Vicar Apostolic of the Northern District.

=== Philanthropist ===
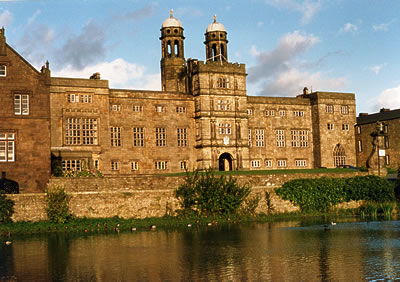
Stonyhurst college, a 1794 benefaction by Weld to the English Jesuits still under Suppression

Weld became known especially for his charitable works on behalf of the English refugees of the French Revolutionary wars. He donated his Lancashire seat, Stonyhurst, near Clitheroe, with 30 acres (120,000 m^{2}) of land, to the returning exiled English Jesuits. He supported the English Poor Clares who had fled from Gravelines. He founded and maintained a Trappist monastery at Lulworth (now Mount Melleray Abbey, Ireland).

Following the French Revolution, surviving members of the French royal family were invited to use Lulworth as one of their residences-in-exile. Later Charles X of France and family also stayed there briefly as guests of Joseph Weld, following the July Revolution of 1830 on their way to Edinburgh.

He was regarded as very pious and greatly hospitable. He endowed a church, St Michael's and St John's in Clitheroe, and requested that the parish priest say Mass annually for the repose of his and his wife's souls. He was one of the first English Catholics to entertain the king, in 1789 and in 1791 at his Lulworth Estate. He was also a supporter of John Milner. He died suddenly at Stonyhurst, where two of his sons also died, one of them, John, was its Jesuit Rector at the time. He was buried in the chapel of Lulworth Castle. Thomas Weld is believed to have given away half his income to charitable causes.

== The Weld family motto ==
Nil sine numine translates as "Nothing without divine providence", and is the motto of the Weld family. The motto happens to be shared with the State of Colorado on the seal it adopted in 1877, and with a number of American institutions.

== Issue ==
Some sources refer to fourteen children of Thomas Weld and his wife, Mary Massey-Stanley: there were fifteen:

- Thomas, b. 1773, married Lucy Clifford, 1796, had issue. Widowed, became a priest and cardinal
- Juliana, b. 1774 died unmarried
- Edward, b. 1775 (died young)
- Joseph, b. 1777, married Charlotte Mary Stourton, 1802, had issue
- Catherine Winifred, b.1776, married William Stourton, 18th Baron Stourton, had issue
- John, b. 1780 became a Jesuit priest and rector of Stonyhurst
- William, b. 1781 (died young)
- Humphrey, b. 1783, married Christiana-Maria Clifford, had issue
- Mary Theresa, b. 1784, became a nun of the Order of the Visitation of Holy Mary
- James, b. 1785, married Juliana-Anne Petre, had issue
- George, b. 1786, married Maria Searle, had issue
- Francis, b. 1787, (died young)
- Clare, b. 1788?, became a nun of the Order of the Visitation of Holy Mary
- Elizabeth Mary, b.1789? married Charles Thomas Bodenham de la Barre of Rotherwas, Herefordshire, had issue
- Theresa, b. 1792? married William Vaughan of Courtfield, Monmouthshire

=== Descendants ===
- Joseph Weld, was the third son of Thomas Weld of Lulworth Castle and succeeded his brother Thomas to the Lulworth Castle and estates, and is remembered as one of the first to build and handle fast-sailing yachts. His best known boat was The Arrow, which took part in the first America's Cup race in 1851 under the ownership of Thomas Chamberlayne. Joseph was also founder of the Isle of Wight based Royal Yacht Squadron.
  - Thomas Weld (1808-1887) heir to Lulworth, took on the name Blundell to inherit the Ince Blundell estate.
- Humphrey Weld of Chideock (21 September 1783 – 9 January 1852), sixth son of Thomas of Lulworth Castle, settled at Chideock Manor, Dorset.
  - Charles Weld, eldest son of Humphrey Weld of Chideock, was an artist of some note, who also made copies of several of the pictures of the English martyrs, the originals of which are now missing.
  - Sir Frederick Weld (1823–1891), another son of Humphrey Weld of Chideock, Prime Minister of New Zealand and Governor of Western Australia, appointed GCMG.
- James Weld of Cowsfield (30 April 1785 – 26 February 1855), seventh son of Thomas Weld of Lulworth.
  - Mgr Francis Weld (died 1898), son of James Weld, was the author of Divine Love, and the Love of God's Most Blessed Mother (London, 1873).
- George Weld of Leagram Park (28 September 1786 – 31 March 1866), eighth son of Thomas Weld of Lulworth.
  - Alfred Weld (1823–1890), son of Mary, née Searle, and George Weld, was a leading English Jesuit. He was the author of The Suppression of the Society of Jesus in the Portuguese Dominions (London, 1877).

== See also ==
- William Clifford
- Edward Stourton
- Cardinal Herbert Vaughan

== Bibliography ==
- Turner, F.J. Weld, Thomas(1750–1810) https://doi.org/10.1093/ref:odnb/39555
- GERARD, Stonyhurst College (Belfast, 1894)
- Weld of Lulworth Castle archive (ref: D/WLC), family and estate papers, 1261–1951, held at the Dorset History Centre
- Kauffman, Miranda (2007). "English Heritage Properties - 1600-1830, Slavery Connections - A Report Undertaken to Mark the Bicentenary of the Abolition of the British Atlantic Slave Trade". One: Report and Appendix 1. Historic England: 46–7. Lulworth Castle: Genealogy of Weld Family
- Whitehead, Maurice (2016). English Jesuit Education: Expulsion, Suppression, Survival and Restoration, 1762-1803. Routledge. ISBN 978-1-3171-4305-5.
