= Eleanor Anne Porden =

English poet

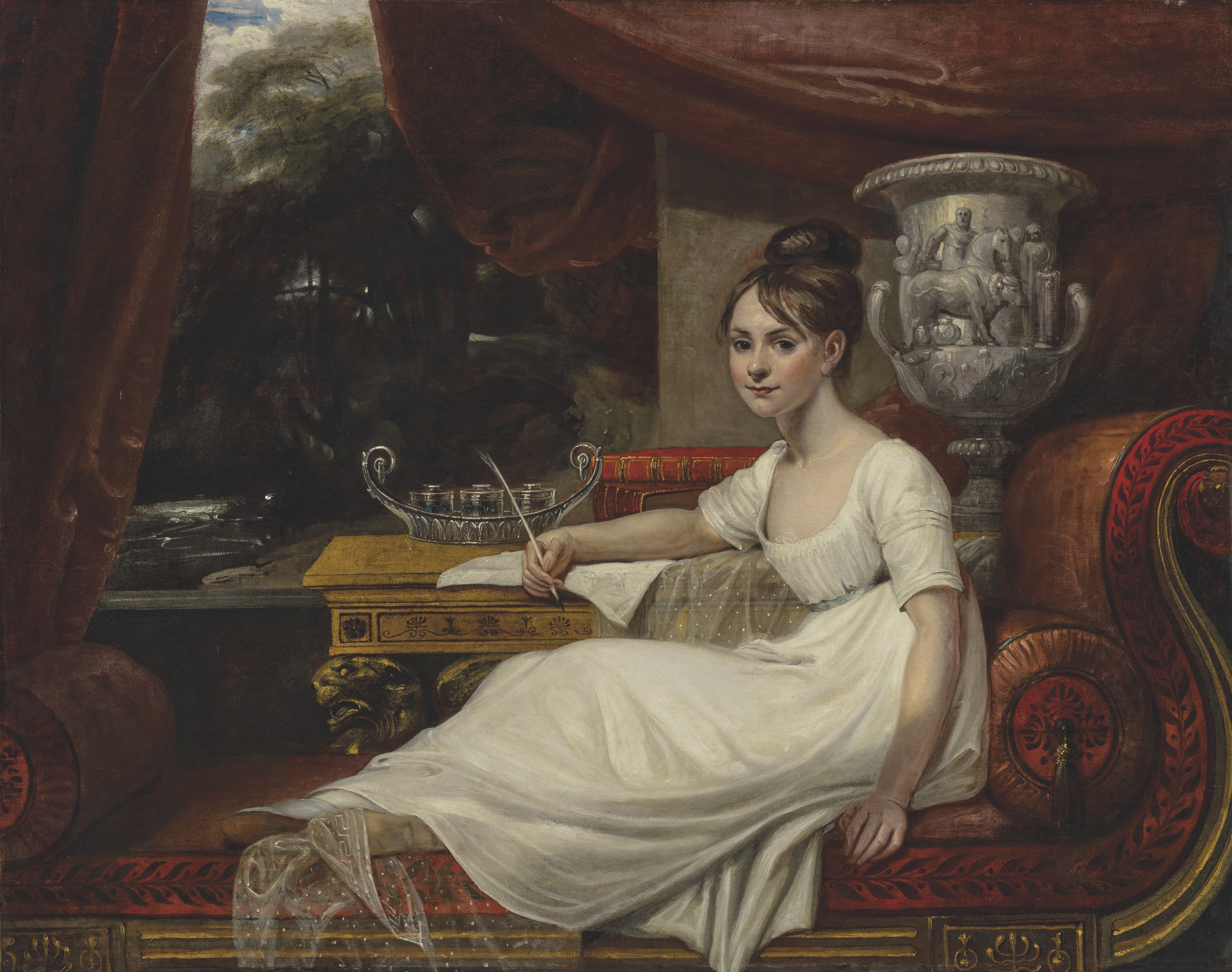
- Portrait of Eleanor Anne Porden, by Mary Ann Flaxman, circa 1811
- Born: 14 July 1795; London, England
- Died: 22 February 1825 (aged 29)
- Occupation: Poet
- Spouse: John Franklin (m. 1823)
- Children: 1
- Parent(s): William Porden; Mary Plowman
- Writing career
- Language: English
- Notable works: Cœur de Lion, or The Third Crusade. A poem, in sixteen books
- Movement: Romanticism

Eleanor Anne Porden (14 July 1795 – 22 February 1825) was a British Romantic poet. She was the first wife of the explorer John Franklin.

== Early years and education ==
Eleanor Anne Porden was born in London, 14 July 1795. She was the younger surviving daughter of William Porden of Berners Street, London, an eminent architect, and his wife Mary Plowman. Another sister and brother had died in infancy. Her mother was an invalid, and after an older sister's marriage, Eleanor nursed her mother from 1809 until her death in 1819.

An intelligent young woman, Porden was educated privately at home. She learned several languages, and was interested in the arts and sciences. Porden attracted attention for her poetry from an early age. Her family and friends liked literature, and a salt-box for poetical contributions was kept at her father's house. Her first major work, the allegorical The Veils; or the Triumph of Constancy, was placed in that depository before she turned 18.

== Career ==
Published in 1815, when she was twenty, she prefaced The Veils with an introduction which gave a clear indication of her interests and education:—"The author, who considers herself a pupil of the Royal Institution, being at that time attending the Lectures given in Albemarle-Street, on Chemistry, Geology, Natural History, and Botany, by Sir Humphry Davy, Mr. Brand, Dr. Roger (sic, for Roget), Sir James Edward Smith, and other eminent men, she was induced to combine these subjects with her story; and though her knowledge of them was in a great measure orally acquired, and therefore cannot pretend to be extensive or profound, yet, as it was derived from the best teachers, she hopes it will seldom be found incorrect." It included a dedication to the Countess Spencer, and obtained the admiration of her social circle. The reviews of the period made favourable mention of the work. It represents the regions of the four so-called elements, earth, air, fire, and water; and shows their active properties under the imagery of fabled inhabitants engaged in antagonistic struggles for supremacy. A critic of Virtue and Company (1875) stated:—"The operation of this Rosicrucian machinery is ingenious, and the versification not below mediocrity. Crudeness and pedantry are the most prominent faults of The Veils."

In 1818, she met her future husband, John Franklin, on board his ship, HMS Trent, before his departure on David Buchan's British Naval North Polar Expedition. This inspired a short poem, The Arctic Expeditions.

In 1822, she produced her best work, an epic poem on the subject of the third Crusade. It was during Franklin's absence that she researched and wrote the historical epic poem, Cœur de Lion, or The Third Crusade. A poem, in sixteen books. This was published in two volumes, with a dedication to the king, George IV. Based on historical research, and also on mediaeval romances, it recounts the adventures of Richard I of England on the Third Crusade. Other prominent characters include Guy of Lusignan, Isabella of Jerusalem (portrayed as a femme fatale), and Conrad of Montferrat, whom she depicts as a flawed, tragic Byronic hero, in contrast with the unequivocally hostile treatment by her contemporary Walter Scott in The Talisman. She also depicts Richard's former fiancée, Alasia of France, fighting for the Saracens as the female knight Zorayda, and being mortally wounded by her own son (fathered by Henry II). Indeed, despite such fanciful episodes, strongly influenced by Torquato Tasso, her poem has more historical content than Scott's better-known novel. Her sources for it included the works of Joseph François Michaud and Charles Mills and a range of medieval texts, including the Itinerarium Regis Ricardi and the fourteenth-century romance Richard Coer de Lyon.

Also in 1822, Franklin returned from the Arctic, her father died, and she ruptured a blood-vessel on the lungs, which increased an inherent tendency to consumption. She made her acceptance of Franklin's proposal conditional on his acceptance of her continuing her career as a poet after their marriage. She wrote to him six months before the wedding:—"it was the pleasure of Heaven to bestow those talents on me, and it was my father's pride to cultivate them to the utmost of his power. I should therefore be guilty of a double dereliction of duty in abandoning their exercise."

== Death ==
She married Franklin on 19 August 1823. She gave birth to their daughter, Eleanor Isabella, on 3 June 1824, after which for a short time her health revived. Childbirth, however, accelerated the advance of the tuberculosis from which she suffered, and she died on 22 February 1825, aged twenty-nine. She had encouraged her husband not to let his concerns for her health impede his career, and he had set off on the second Arctic Land expedition shortly before her death. On his return, he married her friend Jane Griffin.

Mary Russell Mitford, in the introduction to her Dramatic Works, said:—

“It was during the run of Julian, that, seeing much of my dear friend, Miss Porden (afterwards married to Sir John Franklin), and talking with her of subjects for a fresh effort, one or the other, I hardly know which, hit upon ‘Rienzi.’ Miss Porden had herself written an heroic poem called Coeur de Lion, which, if anybody now-a-days could read an epic two volumes long, would be found remarkable as a promise; so she was far from being startled at my boldness, and took a vivid interest in my attempt. A year or two after, when in London negotiating about this very play, I saw her again as Mrs. Franklin. Her husband was in Lincolnshire, taking leave of his relations before setting forth on one of his adventurous voyages; and in the midst of her warm and undiminished sympathy with my anxieties, she talked of that husband whose projects of polar discovery had filled her imagination, showed me his bust and their little girl, and a flag which she was working for him, as her own Berengaria had done for Richard. It was poetry in action, epic poetry; and I, too, sympathised with the devoted wife. But I saw, what at that time her own sister had not suspected, that she was dying. This warmhearted and large-minded woman was of a frame and temperament the most delicate and fragile. The agitation of parting was too much for her, and before Captain Franklin’s expedition was out of the Channel she was dead.”
