= Charles Stourton, 17th Baron Stourton =

English peer

Arms of Stourton: Sable, a bend or between six fountains

Charles Philip Stourton, 17th Baron Stourton (1752–1816) was an English peer.

== Early life ==
Stourton was the son of William Stourton, 16th Baron Stourton and Winifred Howard, a great-granddaughter of the 6th Duke of Norfolk and a leading Roman Catholic.

== Career ==
The seventeenth Baron succeeded his father in 1781, and was succeeded by his son William Joseph in 1816. Charles inherited Roundhay Park in Leeds, from his father, whose father, Captain the Hon. Charles Stourton, son of William Stourton, XII Baron Stourton, had acquired the estate by marriage and inheritance but sold it in 1803 before acquiring the Allerton Mauleverer estate in Yorkshire.

== Personal life ==
On 12 July 1775, Charles married Mary Langdale, a daughter of Marmaduke, 5th Baron Langdale and his wife, Constantia Smythe, a sister of Walter Smythe and therefore an aunt of Maria Anne Smythe, who, following her second marriage became known as Mrs. Fitzherbert, the longtime companion of George, Prince of Wales (later King George IV of the United Kingdom). They had eight children, including:

- William Stourton, 18th Baron Stourton
- Sir Edward Marmaduke Joseph Vavasour, 1st Baronet Vavasour of Hazelwood.
- Charles Langdale, who became one of the first Roman Catholics in the House of Commons and was a leading Roman Catholic layman in the 19th century.

Lord Stourton died in 1816.

Peerage of England
Preceded by William Stourton	Baron Stourton; 1781–1816	Succeeded by William Stourton
