= Thomas Weld (cardinal) =

Catholic cardinal

His Eminence Thomas Weld
- Cardinal-priest of San Marcello al Corso
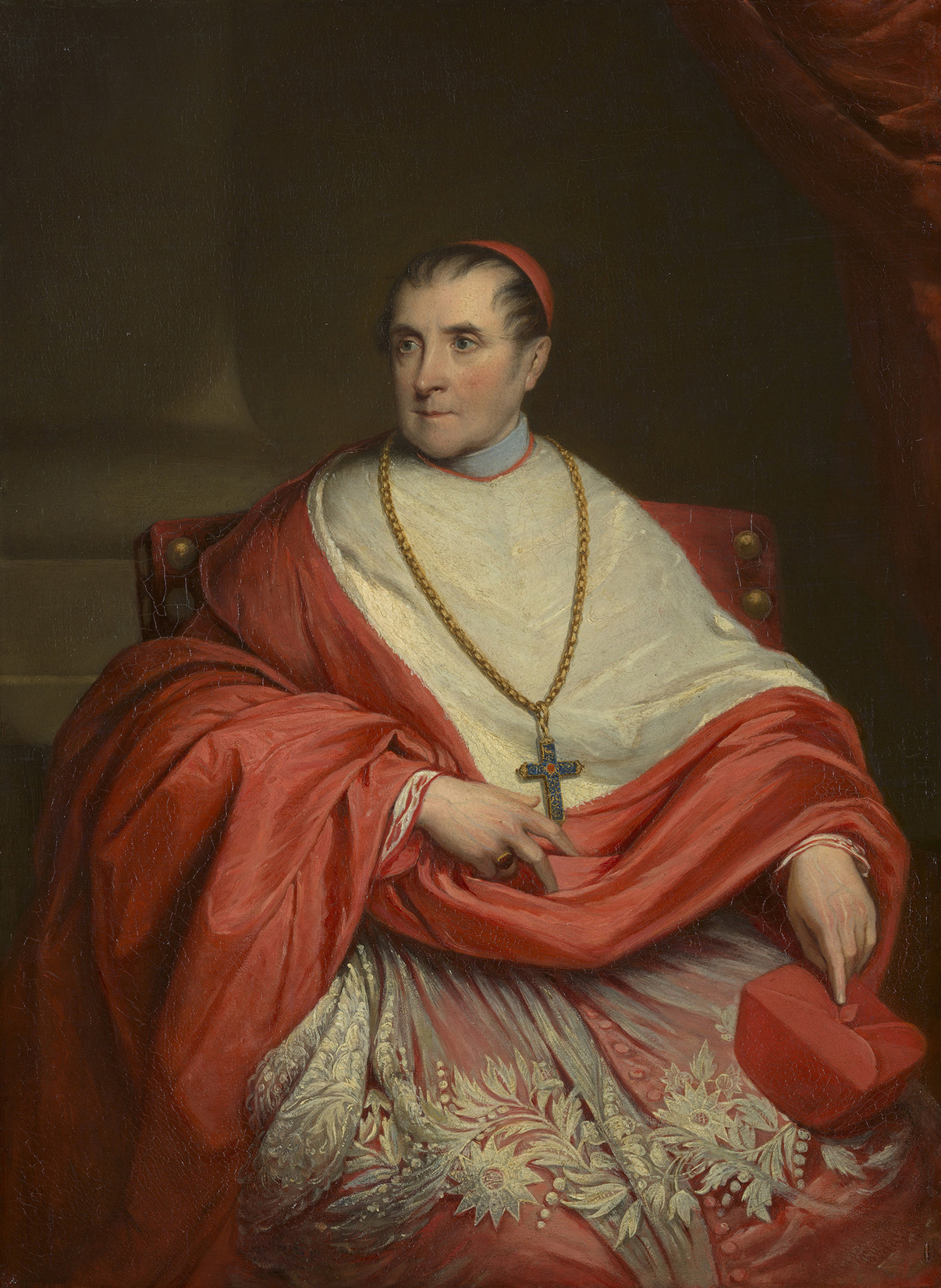
- Church: Catholic Church
- Other post: Cardinal-priest of San Marcello al Corso
- Previous posts: Coadjutor Bishop of Kingston and Titular Bishop of Amyclae

Orders
- Ordination: 3 April 1821 by Hyacinthe-Louis de Quélen
- Consecration: 6 August 1826 by William Poynter
- Created cardinal: 15 March 1830 by Pius VIII
- Rank: Cardinal-priest

Personal details
- Born: 22 January 1773 London
- Died: 10 April 1837 (aged 64) Rome
- Buried: Santa Maria in Aquiro, Rome
- Denomination: Roman Catholic
- Parents: Thomas and Mary Weld
- Spouse: Lucy Bridget Clifford
- Children: Mary Lucy Weld

Thomas Weld (22 January 1773 – 10 April 1837) was an English landowner who renounced his assets to enter the priesthood. He was consecrated bishop and cardinal.

== Early life ==
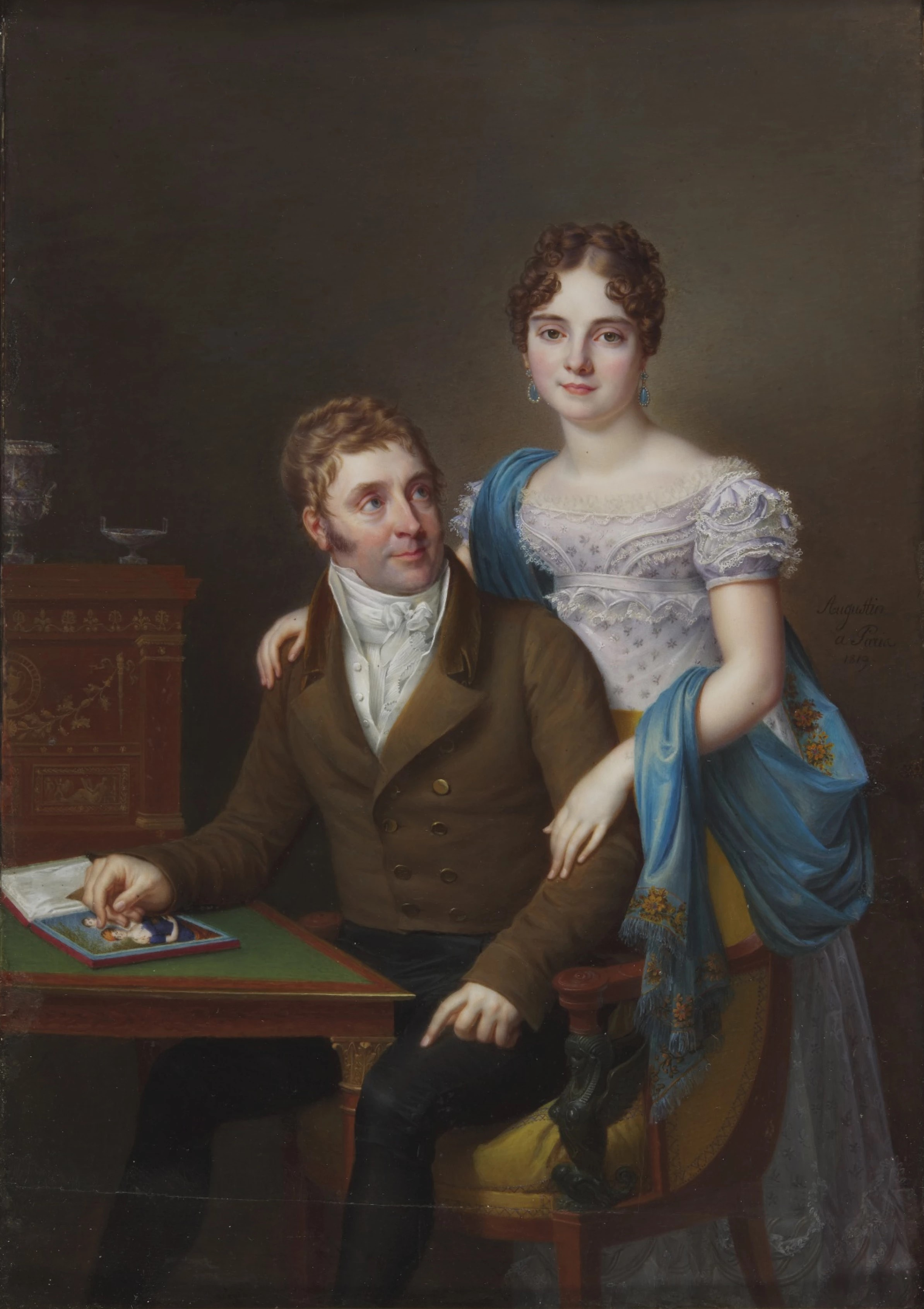
Portrait miniature of Thomas Weld and his daughter Mary Lucy, painted in Paris in 1819 by Jean-Baptiste Jacques Augustin

Weld was born in London on 22 January 1773, the eldest son of the fifteen children of Thomas Weld of Lulworth Castle, Dorset, by his wife Mary Stanley, eldest daughter of Sir John Stanley Massey Stanley of Hooton, who belonged to the elder and Catholic branch of the Stanley family, now extinct. He was educated at home under Jesuit Charles Plowden.

His father, Thomas Weld, a former pupil of the Jesuit school in Bruges, had in 1794 donated 30 acres of land with buildings, to the Society of Jesus to establish Stonyhurst College. He distinguished himself in relieving the misfortunes of the refugees of the French Revolution, and supported the English Poor Clares who had fled from Gravelines, and the Visitandines; and he founded and maintained a Trappist monastery at Lulworth.

His uncle, Edward Weld (c.1740–1775), married Maria Smythe in July 1775, but he died just three months later after a fall from his horse. His widow later married Thomas Fitzherbert in 1778, but he died in 1781. The widowed Mrs Fitzherbert was introduced to George, Prince of Wales (later King George IV) in spring 1784, and they went through a form of marriage on 15 December 1785. The marriage was considered invalid under the Royal Marriages Act 1772 because it had not been approved by King George III and the Privy Council. Later when Weld was installed as a cardinal in Rome, he persuaded Pope Pius VII to declare his aunt's marriage to George sacramentally valid.

== Career ==
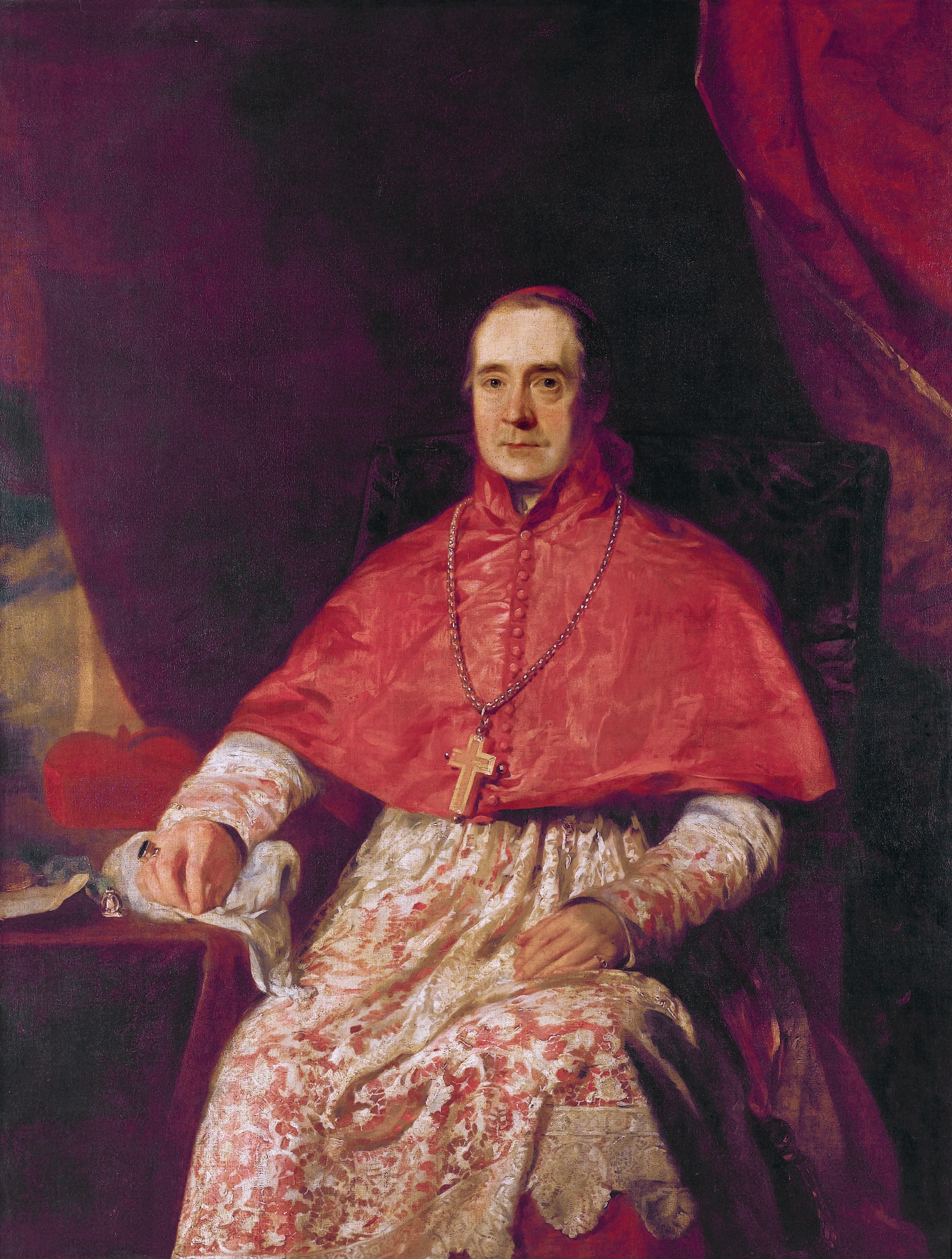
Portrait of Cardinal Weld by Andrew Geddes

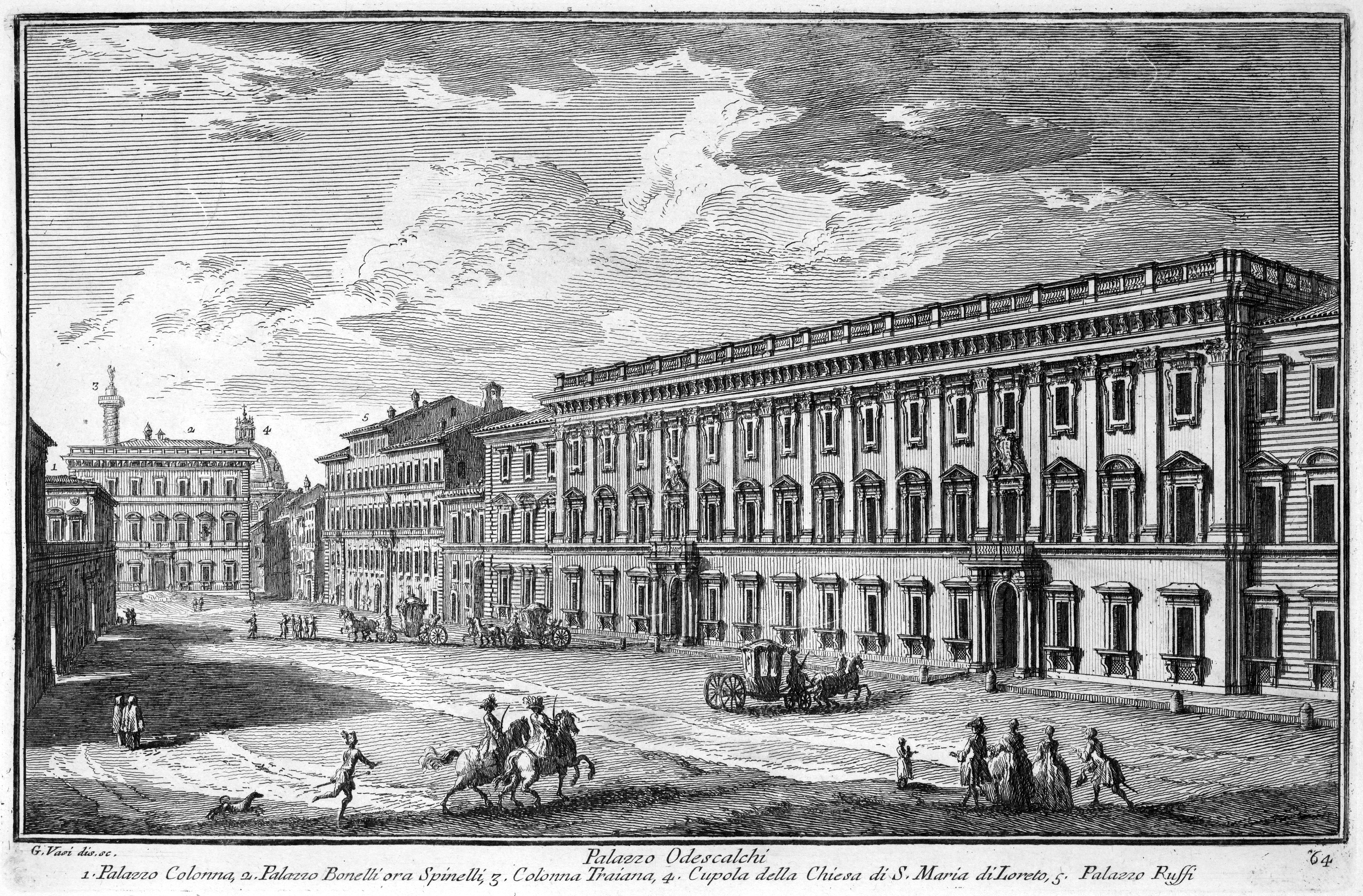
Palazzo Chigi-Odescalchi Rome, from an etching

On 14 June 1796, Weld married Lucy Bridget, who eventually died in 1815. Widowed and with no further family responsibilities, Weld found himself at liberty to follow a religious vocation and become a priest. He renounced the Lulworth and other estates in favour of his next brother, Joseph Weld. He placed himself under the religious guidance of his old friend, the celebrated Abbé Carron. Another friend, the Archbishop of Paris, Hyacinthe-Louis de Quélen ordained him priest in Paris on 7 April 1821. Weld had meanwhile sponsored an orphanage in London.

On 20 June 1822 he began to assist the priest in charge of the Chelsea mission, and after some time he was moved to Hammersmith. The Holy See nominated him coadjutor to Alexander Macdonell (1762–1840), the Bishop of Kingston, Ontario. On 6 August 1826 Weld was raised to the titular see of Amyclae, a town in the Peloponnese, in a ceremony performed at St Edmund's College, Ware, by Bishop William Poynter.

Family circumstances delayed his departure for Canada. As his daughter, Mary, was in failing health, he decided to accompany her and her husband to Italy. Shortly after their arrival in Rome, on 19 January 1830, Cardinal Albani announced to Weld that Pope Pius VIII had decided to elevate him to the College of Cardinals. The ceremony occurred on 15 March 1830, with Weld becoming cardinal priest of San Marcello al Corso in Rome.

His elevation to the Sacred College prompted assurances from people of high influence in England that his nomination had excited no jealousy, and was met with general satisfaction. He took up residence in an apartment in the immense Odescalchi Palace in Rome. In his opulent premises he periodically received visits from the aristocracy of Rome, native and foreign, and from large numbers of his fellow-countrymen.

Meanwhile, his brother, Joseph Weld (1777–1863), had received the Pylewell Park estate on the Solent as a wedding gift from his parents on his marriage in 1802 to Charlotte Mary Stourton, daughter of Mary Langdale and Charles Stourton, 17th Baron Stourton. Having succeeded to the Lulworth estate, Joseph and his family moved to Lulworth. There he hosted the exiled Royal family of France at Lulworth in August 1830, the king and his suite remaining there for some days, until their move to Holyrood House. Joseph, a keen yachtsman, was also founder of the Isle of Wight-based Royal Yacht Squadron. He owned several yachts, the "Alarm", "Arrow" and "Lulworth", which he navigated himself until very late in life. He took a personal interest in the construction and sailing of his vessels.

== Personal life ==
On 14 June 1796 Weld married, at Ugbrooke, Lucy Bridget, second daughter of Thomas Clifford of Tixall, fourth son of Hugh, third Lord Clifford. Their only child was born at Upwey, near Weymouth:

- Mary Lucy Weld (1799–1831), who married her second cousin, Hugh Charles Clifford (afterwards seventh Baron Clifford of Chudleigh), in 1818.

His wife died in Clifton on 1 June 1815. His daughter died in Palo on 15 May 1831, and was buried on 18 May in her father's Roman church. Cardinal Weld died on 10 April 1837. His remains were deposited in the church of Santa Maria in Aquiro. The funeral oration, delivered by Nicholas (afterwards Cardinal) Wiseman, was later published.

=== Descendants ===
Through his daughter Mary, he was a grandfather of two granddaughters and six grandsons, among them, Charles Hugh Clifford, 8th Baron Clifford of Chudleigh (1819–1880), William Clifford, later Bishop of Clifton from 1857 to 1893 and Sir Henry Hugh Clifford (1826–1883), who was awarded the Victoria Cross. In 1857, Henry married Josephine Anstice. The couple had three sons and five daughters.

== Sources ==
This article incorporates text from a publication now in the public domain: "Weld, Thomas (1773-1837)". Dictionary of National Biography. London: Smith, Elder & Co. 1885–1900.
