= William Porden =

English architect (c. 1755–1822)

William Porden (c. 1755 – 1822) was a versatile English architect who worked for the 1st Earl Grosvenor and the Prince Regent.

== Life ==
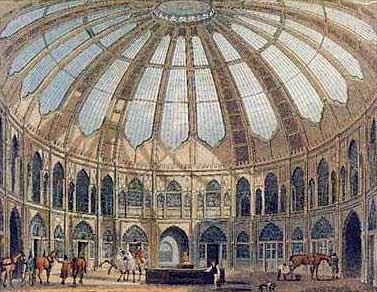
Brighton Pavilion Riding School and Stables

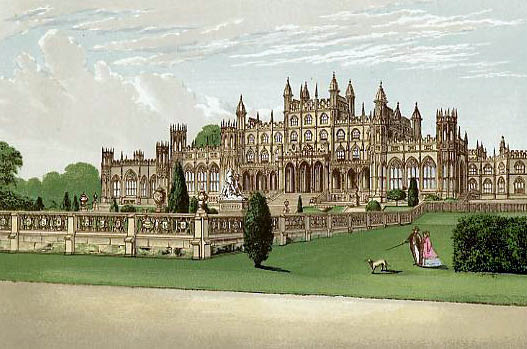
Eaton Hall, later remodelled and extended by Alfred Waterhouse, demolished c.1960

Born in Kingston upon Hull, he trained under James Wyatt and Samuel Pepys Cockerell.

In 1784, the year of his marriage to Mary Plowman, Porden was appointed estate surveyor by the 1st Earl Grosvenor. This position involved assessing buildings on the Grosvenor Estate in Mayfair and determining the "fine" which an occupier had to pay when his lease fell in, and the revised ground rent. More than twenty years later, Porden was appointed to reconstruct the Grosvenors' country seat, Eaton Hall in Cheshire. This project was carried out in a Gothic Revival style.

From 1804 to 1808, he designed the stables, riding house and tennis court at the Brighton Pavilion for the Prince of Wales. The riding school was in the "Indo-Saracenic" style, inspired by pictures of Indian buildings. The main building was a notable technical accomplishment for the time, being circular and domed, with a diameter of 24 metres (79 ft) and a height of 19 metres (62 ft). It survives and is now a concert hall called "The Dome". Also in 1804, he designed Steine House for Maria Fitzherbert, the Prince's wife.

Porden was also a garden architect and furniture designer and he was involved in the development of housing on the Phillimore Estate in Holland Park, London.

== Family ==
In 1785, William and Mary Porden had twin daughters, Mary Hannah (who died at the age of two years) and Sarah Henrietta (who married Porden's assistant William Kay). A son, William, born in 1793, also died at the age of two. The youngest child, the poet Eleanor (born in 1795), became the first wife of John Franklin, Arctic explorer and later Governor of Tasmania, but she died before reaching thirty.
