= Maria Fitzherbert =

Royal mistress (1756–1837)

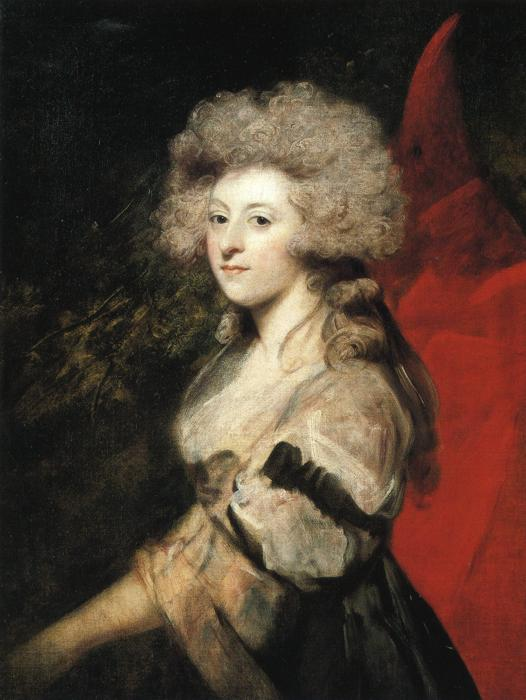
- Portrait of Maria Fitzherbert by Sir Joshua Reynolds, 1788
- Born: Maria Anne Smythe; 26 July 1756; Tong Castle, England
- Died: 27 March 1837 (aged 80); Steine House, Brighton, England
- Resting place: St John the Baptist's Church, Kemptown, Brighton
- Spouse: Edward Weld (m. 1775; died 1775) Thomas Fitzherbert (m. 1778; died 1781)
- Children: at least 1 (with Thomas Fitzherbert)
- Parents: Walter Smythe (father); Mary Ann Errington (mother)

Maria Anne Fitzherbert (née Smythe, previously Weld; 26 July 1756 – 27 March 1837) was a longtime companion of George, Prince of Wales (later King George IV of the United Kingdom). In 1785, they married secretly in a ceremony that was invalid under English civil law because his father, King George III, had not consented to it. Fitzherbert was a Catholic, and the law at the time forbade Catholics or spouses of Catholics to become monarch, so had the marriage been approved and valid, the Prince of Wales would have lost his place in the line of succession. Before marrying George, Fitzherbert had been twice widowed. Her nephew from her first marriage, Cardinal Weld, persuaded Pope Pius VII to declare the marriage sacramentally valid.

== Early life ==
Fitzherbert was born at Tong Castle in Shropshire. She was the eldest child of Walter Smythe (c. 1721–1788) of Brambridge, Hampshire, younger son of Sir John Smythe, 3rd Baronet, of Acton Burnell, Shropshire. Her mother was Mary Ann Errington of Beaufront, Northumberland, maternal half-sister of Charles William Molyneux, 1st Earl of Sefton. Fitzherbert was educated in Paris at a French convent.

== Marriages ==
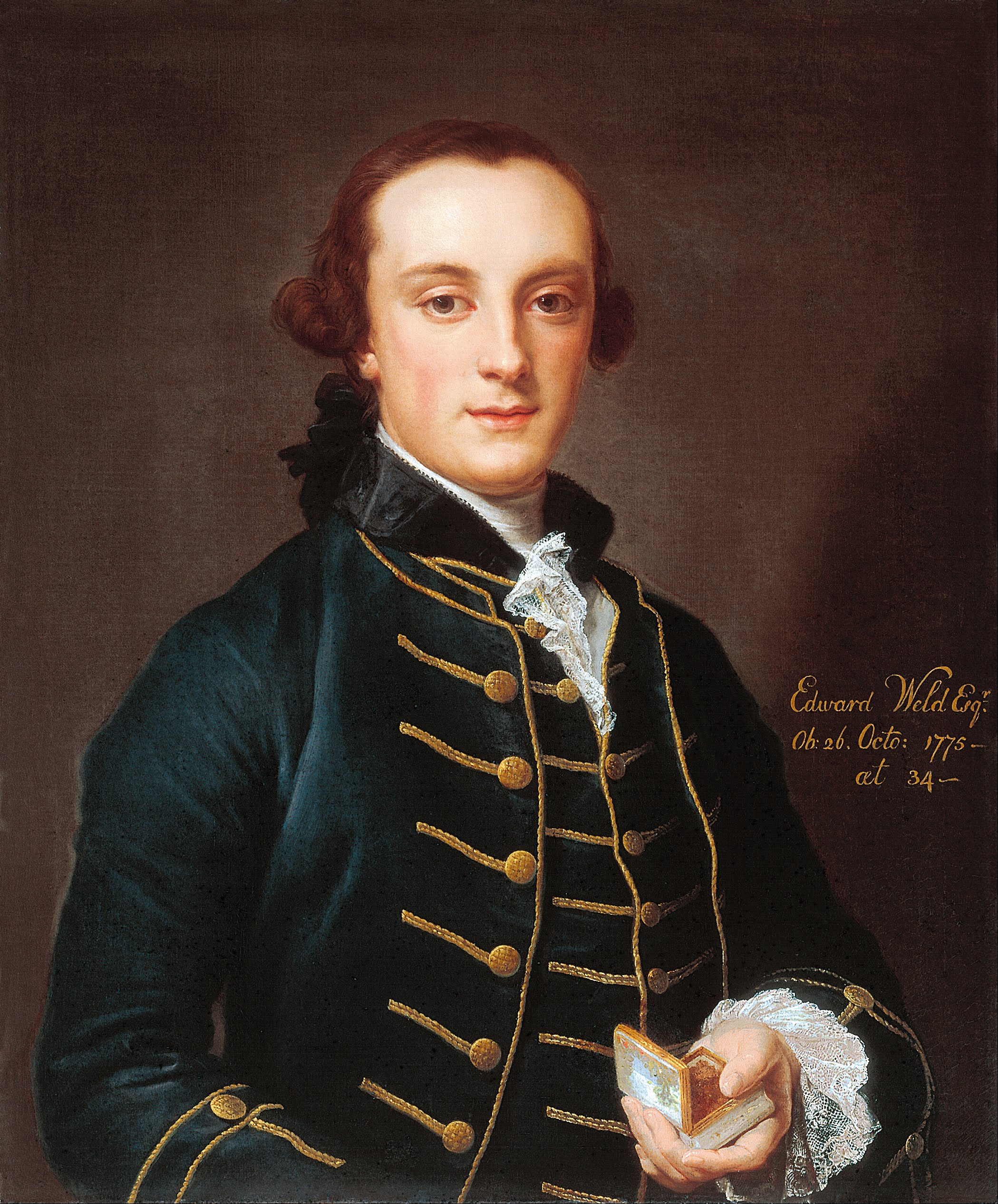
Maria's first husband, Edward Weld, by Pompeo Batoni

At eighteen, Maria married Edward Weld, 16 years her senior, a rich Catholic widower and landowner of Lulworth Castle in July 1775. Weld died just three months later, after a fall from his horse; having failed to sign his new will, his estate went to his younger brother Thomas, the father of fifteen children, including the future Cardinal Weld. His widow was left effectively destitute, had little or no financial support from the Weld family, and was obliged to remarry as soon as she was able.

Three years later, in 1778, she married Thomas Fitzherbert of Swynnerton Hall, Staffordshire. He was ten years her senior. They had a son who died young. She was widowed again on 7 May 1781. He left her an annuity of £1,000 (£148,000 in 2025), and a town house in Park Street, Mayfair.

== Relationship with George ==
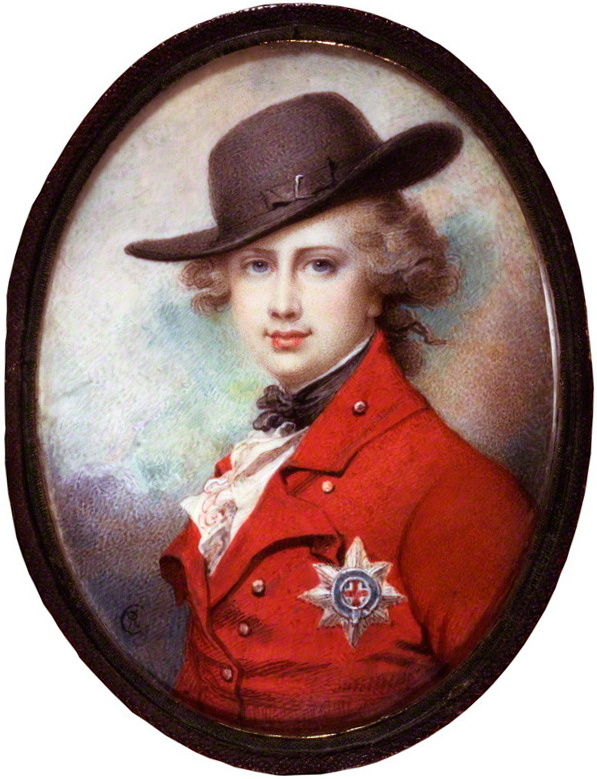
George as Prince of Wales by Richard Cosway, circa 1780–1782

The twice-widowed Fitzherbert soon entered London high society. In spring 1784, she was introduced to a youthful admirer: George, Prince of Wales, six years her junior. The prince became infatuated with her and pursued her endlessly until she agreed to marry him. Secretly, and – as both parties were well aware – against the law, they went through a form of marriage on 15 December 1785, in the drawing room of her house in Park Street, London. Her uncle, Henry Errington, and her brother, John Smythe, were the witnesses. The marriage ceremony was performed by one of the prince's Chaplains in Ordinary, the Reverend Robert Burt, whose debts of £500 (£68,000 in 2025) were paid by the prince to release him from Fleet Prison.

The marriage was not valid under English law because it had not received the prior approval of King George III and the Privy Council as required by the Royal Marriages Act 1772. Had approval been sought, it might not have been granted for many reasons, including, for example, Fitzherbert's Catholic religion. Had consent been given and the marriage been legal, the Prince of Wales would have been automatically removed from the succession to the British throne under the provisions of the Bill of Rights and the Act of Settlement 1701 and replaced as heir-apparent by his brother, the Duke of York. In a similar case, his brother, Prince Augustus Frederick, contracted an invalid marriage with Lady Augusta Murray in 1793 without the King's consent and had two children with her.

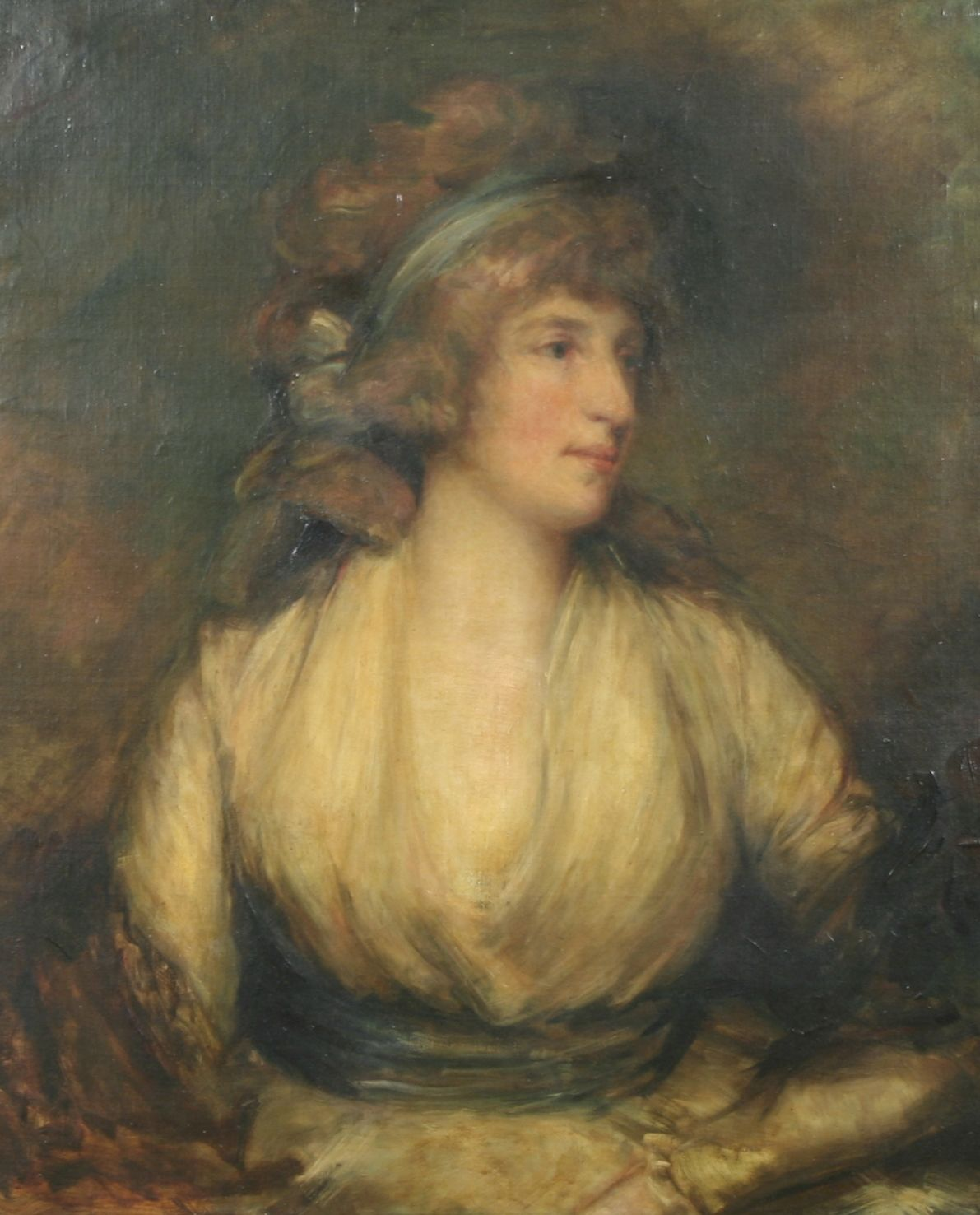
Portrait of Fitzherbert

On 23 June 1794, Fitzherbert was informed by letter that her relationship with the Prince was over. George told his younger brother, the Duke of York, that he and Fitzherbert were "parted, but parted amicably", conveying his intention to marry their first cousin, Duchess Caroline of Brunswick. According to King George III it was the only way out of a hole: his heir apparent's enormous debts of £600,000 (£69 million in 2025) would be paid the day he wed. So the Prince married Caroline on 8 April 1795. However, in 1796, three days after Caroline gave birth to their daughter, Princess Charlotte of Wales, on 10 January, the Prince of Wales wrote his last will and testament, bequeathing all his "worldly property ... to my Maria Fitzherbert, my wife, the wife of my heart and soul". Although by the laws of the country she "could not avail herself publicly of that name, still such she is in the eyes of Heaven, was, is, and ever will be such in mine". However, this did not lead to a reunion. The Prince finally sought a reconciliation with his "second self" during the summer of 1798. By then, he had separated from Caroline for good. He was bored with his mistress, Frances Villiers, Countess of Jersey. In 1811, after becoming Regent, he invited Maria Fitzherbert to the Carlton House Fête. Still, his insistence on seating her at a lower table led to her refusal to attend.

During the first few years of his reign as King George IV, he turned violently against Fitzherbert and several former associates. Whenever he mentioned her name it was "with feelings of disgust and horror", claiming that their union "was an artificial marriage ... just to satisfy her; that it was no marriage – for there could be none without a licence or some written document." Fitzherbert had documents, and after their final break, her demands for her annuity payments were often accompanied by veiled threats to go public with her papers if she did not receive the funds. In June 1830, when the King was dying, he eagerly seized her "get well soon" letter and, after reading it, placed it under his pillow. Fitzherbert – who had no idea just how ill he was – was deeply hurt that he had never replied to her final letter. However, before dying, the King asked to be buried with Fitzherbert's eye miniature around his neck, which was done.

Following the death of George IV on 26 June 1830, it was discovered that he had kept all of Fitzherbert's letters, and steps were taken to destroy them. Fitzherbert told George IV's brother, King William IV, about their marriage and showed him the document in her possession. He "begged her to accept the title of Duchess, but she refused, asking only permission to wear widow's weeds and to dress her servants in royal livery".

== Death ==
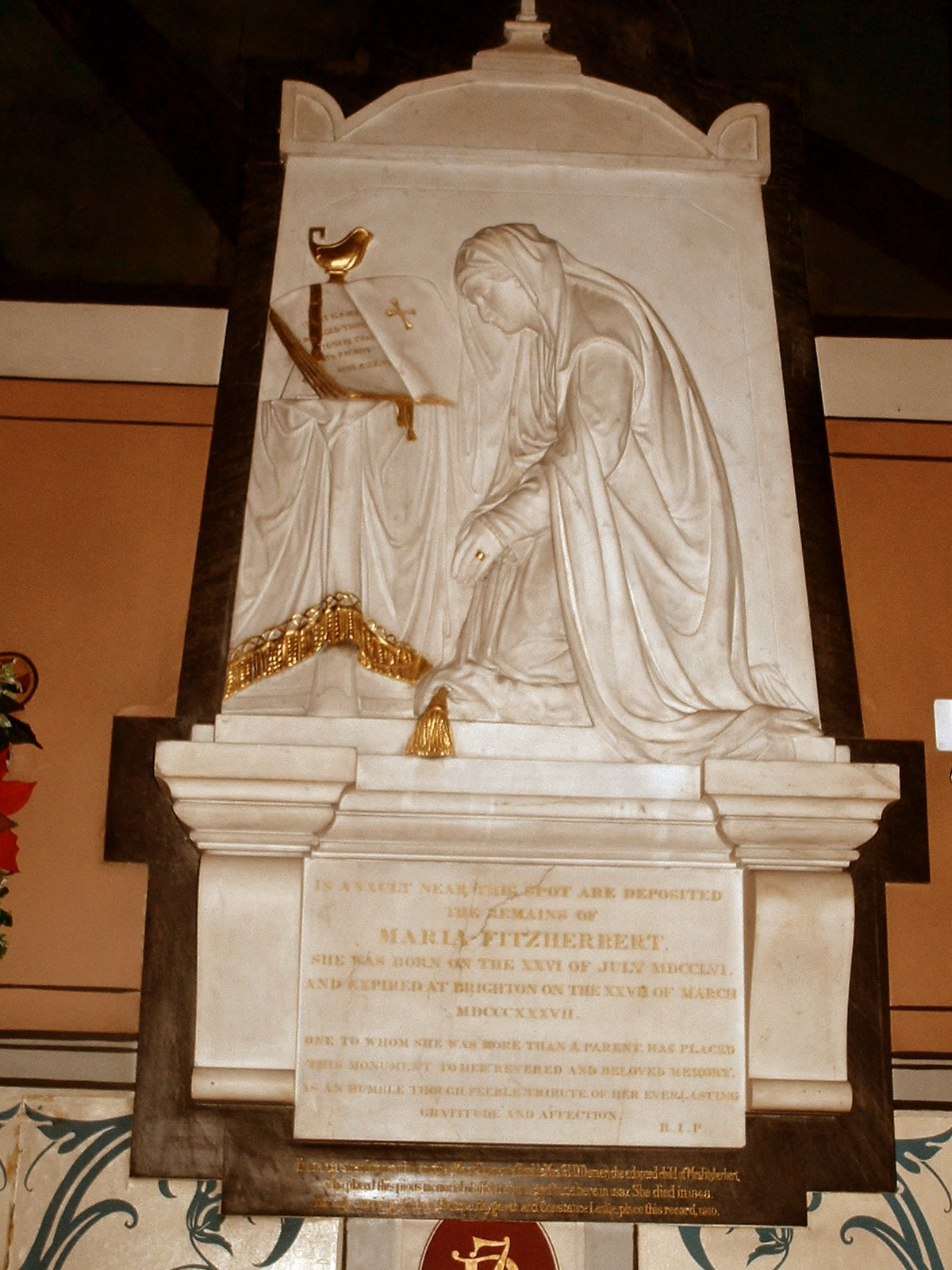
Memorial in St John the Baptist's Church

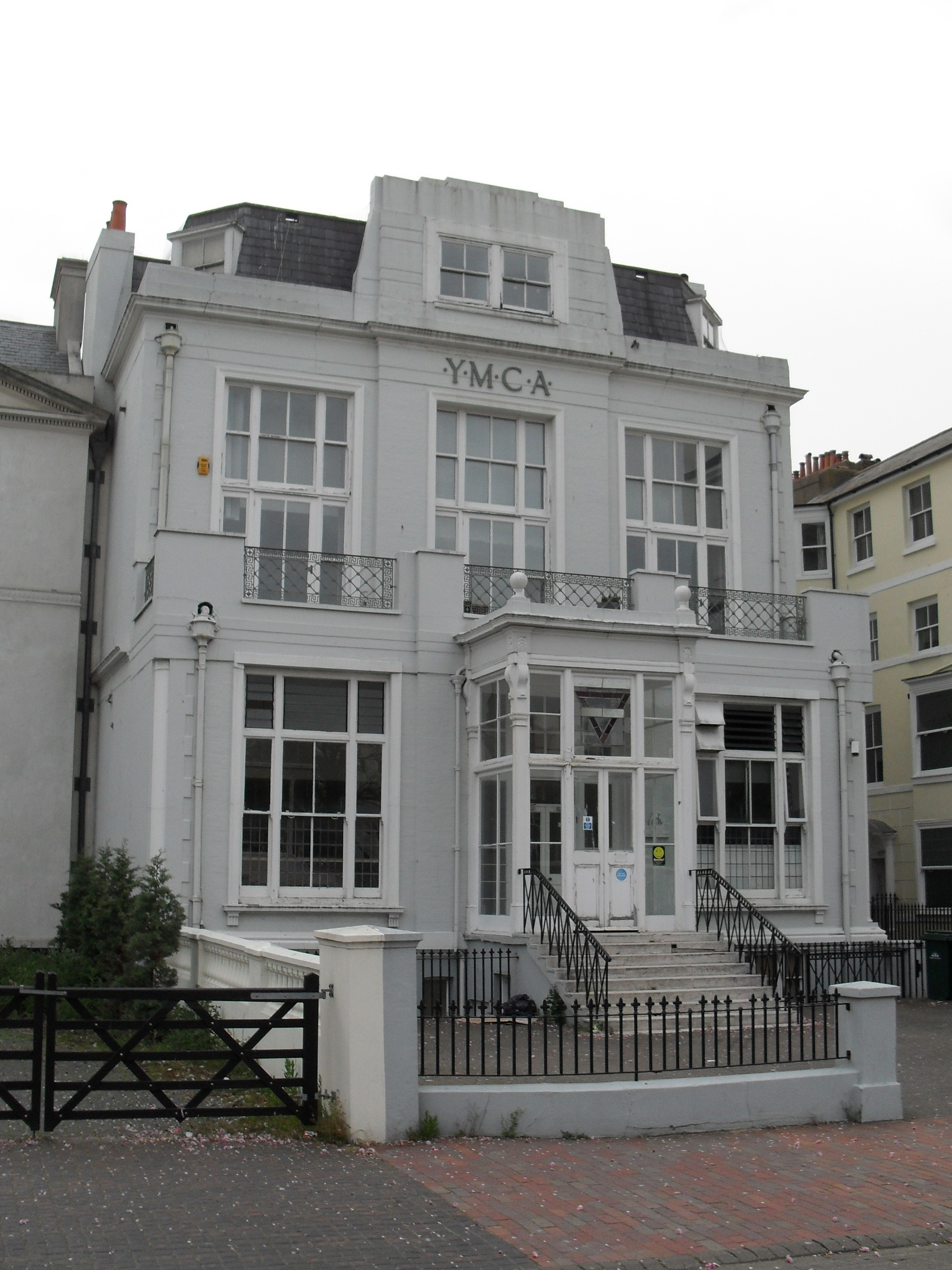
Maria Fitzherbert lived at Steine House in Brighton from 1804 until her death

Architect William Porden designed Steine House, on the west side of Old Steine in Brighton, for Fitzherbert. She lived there from 1804 until she died in 1837. She was buried at St John the Baptist's Church, Brighton, a church built largely with her funds. The memorial sculpture in the nave shows her wearing three wedding rings.

== Possible children by George IV ==
Some scholars have suggested that Maria Fitzherbert had one or two children by her marriage to the future king. "In 1833, after the King's death, one of [his] executors, Lord Stourton, asked her to sign a declaration he had written on the back of her marriage certificate. It read: 'I Mary Fitzherbert ... testify that my Union with George P. of Wales was without issue.' According to Stourton, she, smiling, objected, on the score of delicacy." Indeed, during her early days in Brighton with the Prince of Wales, his uncle, the Duke of Gloucester, and other friends believed Mrs. Fitzherbert to be pregnant.

Members of the Wyatt family claim to be descendants of George IV by her. On Fitzherbert's death, it is stated that her children were adopted by a Scottish family named Wyatt, whose name they assumed. Afterwards, they came south, settling in Erith, Kent. The Wyatt family, in the person of J. G. Wyatt, a former Erith man who later moved to Moose Jaw, Saskatchewan, Canada, and Isabella Annie Wyatt, claimed title to a portion of the Fitzherbert estate in 1937.

One suggested child of the Prince and his longtime paramour was James Ord (born 1786), whose curious history of assisted relocations and encouragement has been chronicled. Ord eventually emigrated to the United States where he worked first near Norfolk, Virginia, as a shipbuilder, next in Charles County, Maryland, in ship construction, and then on a farm outside of Washington, D.C. He joined the Society of Jesus in 1806, but left the order in 1811. Soon thereafter, Ord joined the Navy, but he served in the infantry during the War of 1812. Ord lived in Allegheny County, Maryland, from 1815 to 1819, in Washington, D.C., from 1819 to 1837, in Sault Sainte Marie, Michigan, in the mid-1800s, and in California after 1855. James Ord died in 1873.

In addition to James Ord, the long-term relationship between Fitzherbert and George, as prince and king, appears to have led to more than a dozen claims of children conceived out of wedlock. These join the many additional catalogued cases of George's liaisons, some of which have received further discussion vis-a-vis largely inexplicable financial care given by King George IV or his peers to the immediate purported descendant.

Edward VII, George's grandnephew, granted permission to historian and Fitzherbert biographer William H. Wilkins to open her vault at Coutts Bank in 1906. The release of Wilkins' book later that year prompted several supposed descendants of the Prince and Fitzherbert to claim the latter's substantial estate. A Rebecca Fitzherbert Harris of Kenvil, New Jersey, maintained that through family lore, she was the couple's great-granddaughter via a purported son named Thomas Edward, named after Fitzherbert's first two husbands. In a letter to Edward VII, Harris claimed that Thomas also had a brother and sister who lived for a time with their mother in Dublin. Thomas was supposedly sent to the United States in 1833 by Fitzherbert, who thought her children would be safer there following her death. Harris further stated that her family had received an income from an unknown source in the United Kingdom for many years. Harris requested access to Fitzherbert's papers to pursue her claim of the estate. Edward VII was noted to have acknowledged Harris's letter but stated that he would not assist her further.

The second codicil to Maria Fitzherbert's will outlines her two principal beneficiaries and includes a personal note: "This paper is addressed to my two dear children ... I have loved them both with the tenderest affection any mother could do, and I have done the utmost in my power for their interests and comfort".

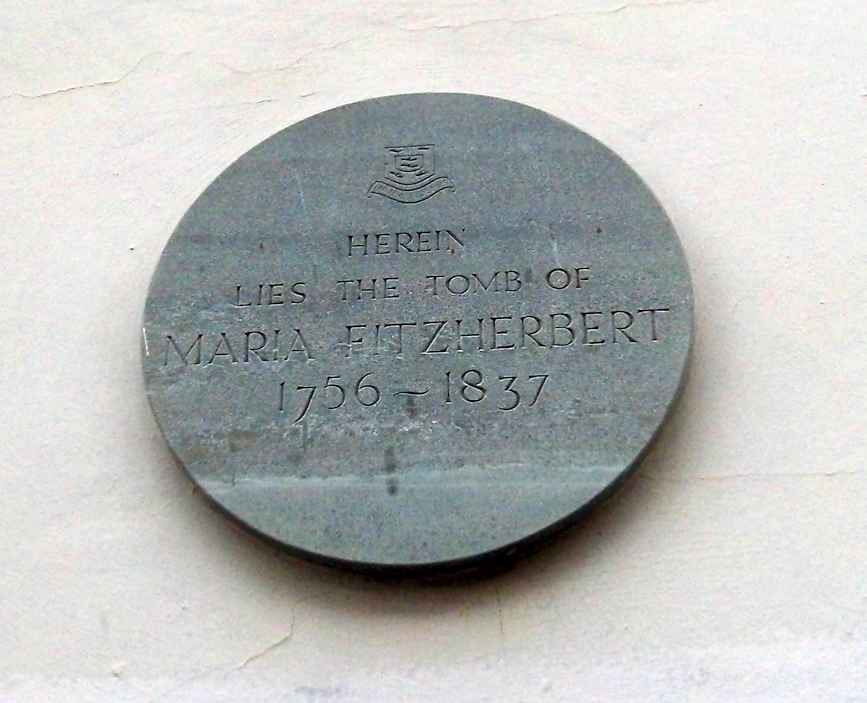
Commemorative plaque at Maria Fitzherbert's burial place in Brighton

Their married names were Mary Ann Stafford-Jerningham and Mary Georgina Emma Dawson-Damer. Stafford-Jerningham was nominally Fitzherbert's 'niece', and was raised as Mary Ann Smythe. Dawson-Damer was nominally the daughter of Admiral Lord Hugh Seymour and Lady Anna Horatia Waldegrave. Seymour had been a close associate of George IV since their youth and Seymour's son George was an executor and minor beneficiary of Fitzherbert's will. There is no evidence that either of these women were the natural children of Maria Fitzherbert – indeed, the reference to 'the affection any mother could do' (with stress on mother) could indicate she only saw herself as a mother figure to them and no more. The will does not refer to any sons, though this observation must be seen in its historical context: of the ten illegitimate children of Dorothea Jordan, Anglo-Irish actress and mistress of 20 years to the Duke of Clarence, later King William IV, care for the five boys was initially assumed by their father and his households, and custody and care for the girls given to Jordan.

Notably, any historical claim of descent is accompanied by controversy, and many preceding have been challenged. Given the death of Princess Charlotte without surviving children, should the Ord link be substantiated, the line descended through them would join a large number of claimed surviving descendants of King George IV.

== Appearance ==
Fitzherbert was described as having an aquiline nose and loose teeth. She had hazel eyes, silky blonde hair, and a flawless complexion.

== On screen ==
Maria is portrayed by:

- Nora Swinburne in the 1943 film The Man in Grey
- Joyce Howard in the 1947 film Mrs. Fitzherbert
- Rosemary Harris in the 1954 film Beau Brummell
- Jeanette Sterke in the 1957 BBC Sunday-Night Theatre teleplay The Lass of Richmond Hill
- Sorcha Cusack in the 1975 BBC television series Private Affairs
- Susannah York in the 1979 television series Prince Regent
- Caroline Harker in the 1994 film The Madness of King George
