= Portrait of Maria Fitzherbert =

Painting by Joshua Reynolds

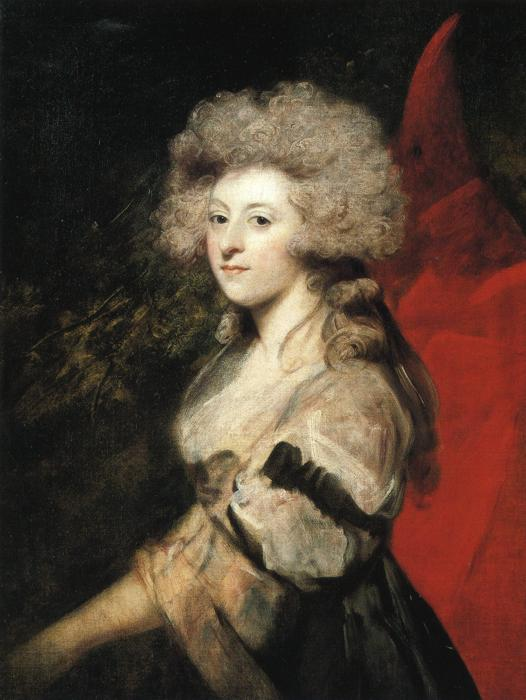
- Artist: Joshua Reynolds
- Year: 1788
- Type: Oil on canvas, portrait
- Dimensions: 91.4 cm × 71.1 cm (36.0 in × 28.0 in)
- Location: National Portrait Gallery; London

Portrait of Maria Fitzherbert is a 1788 portrait painting by the British artist Sir Joshua Reynolds.

The widowed Maria Fitzherbert had entered into a clandestine marriage with George, Prince of Wales in 1785. Although technically illegal due to the Royal Marriages Act, the couple lived together as husband and wife. The issue of this secret earlier marriage became a potentially controversial issue when George entered a dynastic marriage with his cousin Caroline of Brunswick in 1796. Despite this and his numerous affairs, George remained emotionally attached to his earlier marriage and was buried with a miniature of Maria Fitzherbert in 1830.

Reynolds was President of the Royal Academy when he painted Fitzherbert. Today the painting is on display in the National Portrait Gallery in London, having been lent from a private collection in 1976.

== See also ==
- Portrait of George IV, portrait by Thomas Lawrence of Maria Fitzherbert's husband

== Bibliography ==
- Baetjer, Katharine. British Paintings in the Metropolitan Museum of Art, 1575-1875. Metropolitan Museum of Art, 2009.
- Black, Jeremy. George III: America's Last King. Yale University Press, 2008.
- Garfield, Simon. In Miniature: How Small Things Illuminate the World. Simon and Schuster, 2019.
- Irvine, Valerie. The King's Wife: George IV and Mrs Fitzherbert. A&C Black, 2007.
- McIntyre, Ian. Joshua Reynolds: The Life and Times of the First President of the Royal Academy. Allen Lane, 2003.
- Millar, Stephen. Lust, Lies and Monarchy: The Secrets Behind Britain's Royal Portraits. Museyon, 2020
- Postle, Edward (ed.) Joshua Reynolds: The Creation of Celebrity. Harry N. Abrams, 2005.
- Schama, Simon. The Face of Britain: The Nation through Its Portraits. Penguin UK, 2015.
