= Weld-Blundell family =

Branch of English gentry family

The Weld-Blundell family are a cadet branch, arisen in 1843, of the English Welds of Lulworth. It is an old gentry family which claims descent from Eadric the Wild and is related to other Weld branches in several parts of the United Kingdom, notably from Willey, Shropshire, and others in the Antipodes and America. A notable early Weld was William de Welde (or atte Welde), High Sheriff of London in 1352, whose progeny moved in and out of obscurity.

This Weld line is itself a cadet line originating from John Weld of Eaton Hall, Cheshire, and descends from his youngest son, Sir Humphrey Weld, Lord Mayor of London (1608), a Protestant, whose grandson of the same name, having reverted to Catholicism, purchased Lulworth Castle in Dorset, England, in 1641.

They were a notable recusant family prior to Catholic Emancipation in the 19th century. The distantly related Catholic Blundell family died out at the start of the 19th century and passed on their Ince Blundell estate to Thomas Weld (1808-1887), the second son of the then owner of Lulworth Castle, Joseph, on condition that he and his issue adopted the "Blundell" name. The branch in England had died out by 1924, since Herbert Weld Blundell, last of the line, dropped the suffix, "Blundell".

== The Weld History ==
After Humphrey Weld, governor of Portland Castle and grandson of Sir Humphrey Weld, Lord Mayor of London, had bought the Lulworth estates from the Howards and become "Humphrey of Lulworth", his only issue was his daughter, Mary. When he died in 1685, his successor was his nephew, William Weld, son of Humphrey's younger brother, Sir John Weld of Compton Bassett, Knight banneret. William had married Elizabeth Shireburn in 1672 the daughter of the squire of Stonyhurst. William died in 1698 and was succeeded by his surviving younger son, Humphrey. Humphrey married Margaret Simeons and had surviving issue, one of whom, Thomas, changed his surname to Weld-Simeons and married into the Fitzherbert family and went to live in Bruges. Meanwhile, the older surviving son, Edward (1705-1761), became his heir when Humphrey III died in 1722.

Edward Weld and his wife Dame Maria née Vaughan, of the Welsh Bicknor exclave in Herefordshire had four sons and a daughter. The latter became a Poor Clare religious. The eldest of the sons, also Edward (1740 - 1775), became his heir in 1761 aged just 21. He was widowed after his first marriage in 1763 to Juliana Petre, daughter of Robert James Petre, 8th Baron Petre, who died in 1772. In 1775 he married the impecunious Maria Smythe, a cousin by marriage, later Mrs Fitzherbert and the morganatic wife of the Prince of Wales. Three months after the wedding he fell off his horse and died of his injuries, before having time to sign his new will. There was no issue from either marriage, the estate therefore passed to his surviving younger brother, Thomas (1750-1810). Thomas had married Mary Stanley-Massey-Stanley daughter of Sir John Stanley-Massey-Stanley, 6th Baronet (1711–1794). They had six daughters and nine sons, the eldest of whom was also Thomas, who after being widowed and left with a daughter, entered the church and rose to the status of cardinal.

As a result, the Lulworth and other estates were ceded to the third and next surviving son of Thomas and Mary, who was Joseph Weld (1777-1863). He is remembered as one of the earliest Englishmen to build and handle fast-sailing yachts. His best known boat was The Arrow, which took part in the first America's Cup race in 1851 under the ownership of Thomas Chamberlayne. Joseph was also founder of the Isle of Wight based Royal Yacht Squadron. Joseph Weld's heir was his son, Thomas Weld (1808-1883), who would subsequently start the Weld-Blundell line as a result of an inheritance on Merseyside in 1837.

== The Blundell history ==
The first documentation of the name of Blundell on the Ince Blundell site on Merseyside is that of Richard Blundell in 1212. Following the Reformation the Blundells became recusants and kept their Catholic faith and were subjected to the consequent hardships and hazards. They should not be confused with the Anglican merchant Blundells, one of whom, Bryan (c. 1675-1756), was a prominent mariner and slave trader. Despite the penal restrictions placed on Catholics, the Blundell family acquired more assets either by legal transactions or dowries from advantageous marriages. By the end of the 18th century they held 15 manors together with other property, some of it in Liverpool and Preston. One of the noted family members was Nicholas Blundell (1669–1737), of Little Crosby and seated at Crosby Hall, Lancashire, probably best known for his diaries which provide a first-hand insight into the life of 18th-century English gentry.

The extant Ince Blundell Hall was built by Robert Blundell (1700–73) who inherited the estate in 1711. The house was designed by Henry Sephton, who was the "leading mason-architect in the area" at that time. In 1761 Robert Blundell moved from the house to Liverpool, and the estate passed to his eldest son, Henry (1724–1810). Henry extended the house "without the help of a Wyat (sic) or any architect". He made other improvements to the grounds, including a lake and a ha-ha.

Henry Blundell was a collector, of paintings, statues and antiquities. The collection amounted to over 500 items. In order to house them at Ince Blundell, he constructed various buildings in the grounds of the hall to house his pieces. In 1790–92 he built the Garden Temple, a building in Classical style. This was followed in about 1802–05 by the Pantheon, based on the Pantheon in Rome. When Henry died in 1810, the hall passed to his son, Charles. After his death, most of the paintings were sold, and the collection of antiquities given to the National Museums Liverpool and put on show in the Walker Art Gallery. Charles died childless in 1837, and the estate passed to Thomas Weld, a cousin.

== Thomas "Weld-Blundell" ==
As a condition of the inheritance, Thomas took the name of Thomas Weld Blundell, and restored, refurnished and redecorated the Blundell Hall. On 11 March 1843 Queen Victoria granted Thomas Weld (1808-1887), second son of Joseph, her royal licence and authority for him and his issue to use and bear the surname of Blundell in addition to Weld. His cadet Weld line thus became Weld-Blundell upon inheriting the Lancashire estates, previously seated at Ince Blundell Hall and had been a cadet branch of the ancient Blundells of Crosby. The English Catholic Who's Who (1912) mentioned three Weld-Blundells and six Welds.

The Lulworth branch died out by the 1920s, after two sons of Charles Joseph Weld-Blundell died young. Lulworth Castle devolved in 1924 upon Herbert Weld Blundell. His father was Thomas Weld-Blundell of Ince Blundell.

== Reversion of Lulworth to the Welds ==
After the death of the childless Herbert Weld-Blundell in 1935, the Lulworth estates in Dorset reverted to another Weld family member, Col. Sir Joseph William Weld. Meanwhile, the Grade II* listed Ince Blundell Hall in Lancashire, still owned by a branch of the Welds, was sold in 1959 partly to the local council for housing and the hall to an order of nuns, the Canonesses of Saint Augustine, to run it as a nursing home.

== See also ==
- Weld-Blundell Prism
- Blundell of Crosby

== Bibliography ==
- ANON., A history of the Cistercian Order, with a life of Thomas Weld (London, 1852);
- BURKE, Landed Gentry;
- Dillon, James (2009), The Hall in the Woods: Ince Blundell Hall, Augustinian Canonesses of Ince Blundell Hall, ISBN 978-0-9562109-0-6
- Henry Foley, Records S.J.;
- Peter Gallwey, Funeral words on Mr. Charles Weld (Rockhampton, 1885);
- GERARD, Stonyhurst College (Belfast, 1894);
- Letters and Notices, XX (Rochampton, 1890), 317-25;
- MARSHALL, Genealogist's Guide (London, 1893);
- Pollard, Richard; Pevsner, Nikolaus (2006), Lancashire: Liverpool and the South-West, The Buildings of England, New Haven and London: Yale University Press, ISBN 0-300-10910-5
- The Tablet, II (London, 1898), 822;
- Weld of Lulworth Castle archive (ref: D/WLC), family and estate papers, 1261-1951, held at the Dorset History Centre
- Nicholas Wiseman, Funeral Oration on Thomas Cardinal Weld (London, 1837);
