= Edward Weld (Senior) =

Wealthy English landowner (1705–1761)

Edward Weld (1705 – 8 December 1761) was an English gentleman of the landed gentry and a member of an old recusant family. Weld is notable for two trials, one when he was accused of impotency, the other for treason at the time of the Jacobite rising of 1745.

He also made significant improvements at Lulworth Castle.

== Early life ==
Born at East Lulworth, Weld was the third and oldest surviving son of Humphrey Weld (died 1722) of Lulworth Castle, a great-nephew of Humphrey Weld, a Member of parliament who in 1641 had bought the Lulworth Estate on the Jurassic Coast. His mother was Margaret Simeons, a daughter of Sir James Simeons of Chilworth. He was descended from Sir Humphrey Weld, a City of London merchant who was Sheriff of London in 1599 and Lord Mayor of London in 1608, originally from a family in Shropshire.

Weld succeeded his father in 1722. On coming of age, he was the fourth generation of Welds to own the Lulworth estate.

A practising Roman Catholic and a member of the gentry, Weld took care to maintain good relations with his peers. He was esteemed for his "amiable character" and was a good landowner.

== Architectural designer ==
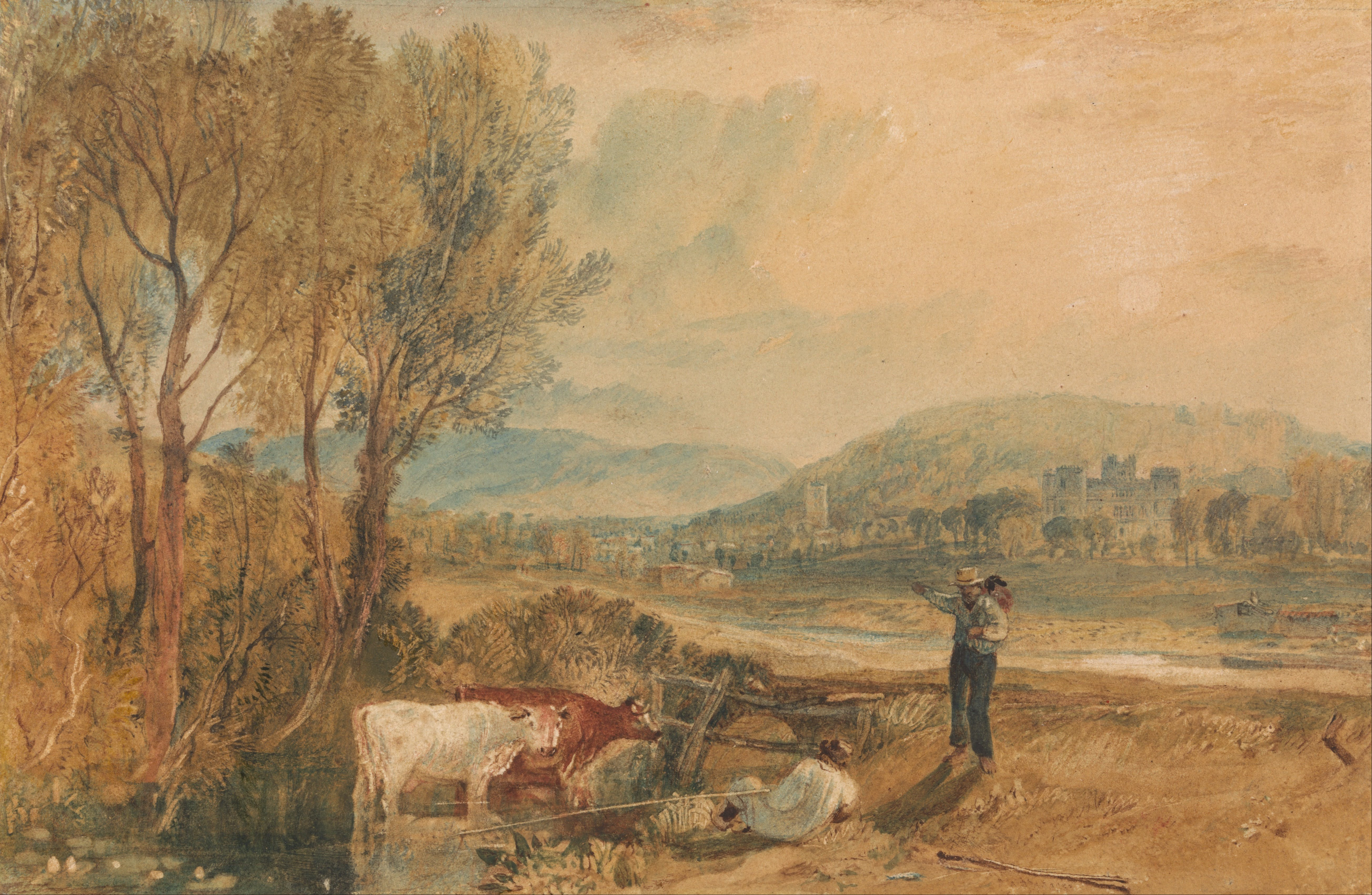
Turner's view of Lulworth Castle, Dorset

Having inherited Lulworth Castle, a country house attributed to Inigo Jones, Weld spent thirty years improving it. The Castle’s interiors were decorated by the Dorset firm of architects Bastard brothers of Blandford Forum. Weld also continued laying out the grounds, begun by his father, extending the castle's southern balustraded terrace and making a walled garden.

He was responsible for initiating the internal Adam style decor and 18th-century furnishing of a rare example of an early 17th century mock Jacobean castellated hunting lodge.

== Personal life ==
In 1727, Weld married Catherine Elizabeth Aston (1708–1739), a daughter of Walter Aston, 4th Lord Aston of Forfar and of Lady Mary Howard, daughter of Lord Thomas Howard and Mary Savile, a sister of Edward Howard, 9th Duke of Norfolk. After three years they had no children. Weld became the subject of a sensational lawsuit taken out by his wife in the ecclesiastical Arches Court at Canterbury on the grounds of non-consummation of their marriage, in effect accusing him of impotence. Having consulted a range of surgeons in London, and undergone a simple surgical procedure, Weld successfully countersued. The couple resolved to live apart, which continued until the death of Mrs Weld in 1739. A sensational report of the lawsuit was published in 1732 by the pseudonymous Crawfurd.

In 1740 Weld married secondly Dame Mary Theresa Vaughan of Courtfield in Monmouthshire, with whom he had a daughter and four sons. The eldest of these was Edward Weld, future husband of Maria Fitzherbert; the youngest was Thomas Weld, who with his wife Mary Stanley had fifteen children, a philanthropist and friend of George III, whom he entertained at Lulworth. Their eldest grandson was Cardinal Thomas Weld.

== Treason trial ==
In 1745 Weld was accused of being associated with the Jacobite rising of 1745, then raging in Scotland and the northern counties of England, due to a letter allegedly found on the road to Poole. He was taken into custody and taken before the magistrates, but they deemed the letter to be a hoax. While the case against him was dismissed, he was ordered to surrender his coach horses, on account of their strength and size, as potentially useful equipment to the rebels. To clear his name, Weld visited the Duke of Newcastle, older brother and minister of the then Prime Minister, Henry Pelham. Upon his death at the age of 56, Weld, by then widowed a second time, received many tributes including eulogies in verse.

== Legacy ==
As Catholic members of the English gentry in the Age of Enlightenment, Edward and his second wife, Mary, chose to have their three surviving sons educated by English Jesuits on the continent. Accordingly, Edward, John and Thomas were despatched to the College of St Omer, later at Bruges in the Spanish Netherlands, where their relatives, the Simeon Welds had settled, and which aside from providing a good education, prepared them for the Grand Tour with social openings in the power centres of Paris and Rome. These connections would later feature prominently in the life of their son Thomas and his descendants' lives, by enabling the repatriation, after over two hundred years, of the English Jesuits to Stonyhurst College donated to them by Thomas, and the Welds' continuous connections with French religious and surviving members of the French royal family. Thomas' subtle influence may have eased the passage of the Catholic Relief Act 1791, (Thomas was a supporter of bishop John Milner), eventually leading to Catholic emancipation with the Roman Catholic Relief Act 1829. While their sons were being schooled abroad, first Mary died in 1754 followed by the middle son, John in 1759 and finally by Edward himself late in 1761.

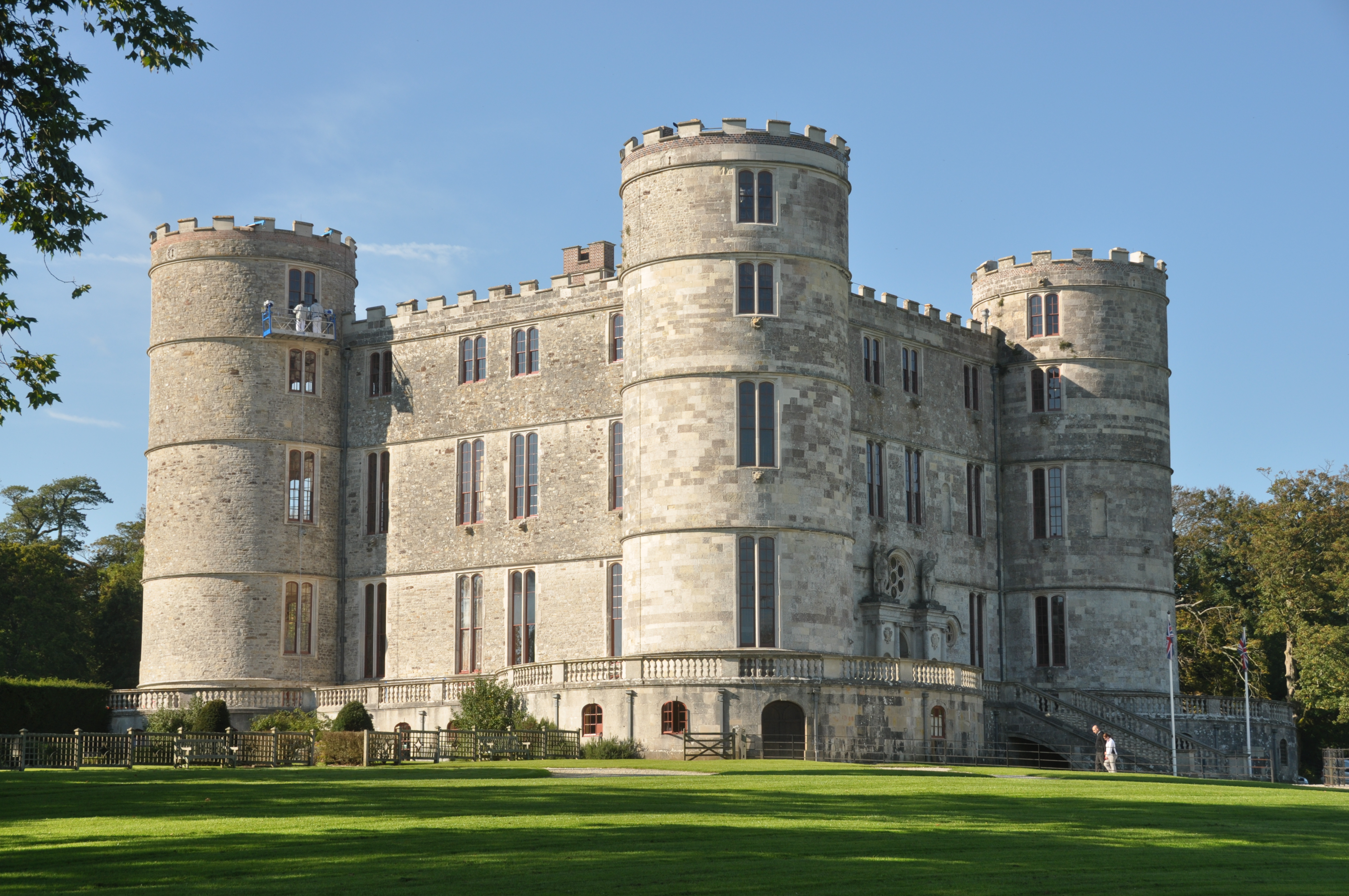
Lulworth Castle in 2013

Edward's grandfather, William Weld, reclaiming Lulworth after its forcible occupation by Roundheads in the English Civil War, came close to insolvency. It was saved mainly through the dowry brought in by Edward's mother, Margaret Simeons, and later by Edward's own skills, which set it on a course to prosper for two centuries in the hands of the Weld family. In 1929, however, during the tenure of Herbert Weld Blundell, Lulworth castle was completely gutted by fire. Edward's and all subsequent improvements to the eighteenth century Adam style interiors, furnishings and pictures, including the magnificent library, were lost, except for a quantity of valuable pictures, books and furniture which were rescued with the help of two teams of Girl Guides who happened to be camping in the park. Fortuitously, a photographic and documentary record of the castle had been made in 1926 by the publication, Country Life. The castle lay a derelict ruin for seventy years until one of Edward's descendants, Wilfrid Weld, undertook a painstaking restoration in partnership with Historic England to bring it to its current status as a museum. Very occasionally, furniture and pictures from Lulworth have appeared in auction rooms, which by their provenance and mid-eighteenth century dating suggest their original acquisition was by Edward Weld.

Edward Weld is the subject of an extant portrait in oil attributed to the painter Adrien Carpentiers.
