= Humphrey Weld (of Lulworth) =

English lawyer and public official

Humphrey Weld DL, MP, JP
- Monarch: Charles II

Governor of Portland Castle, Keeper of Sandsfoot Castle
- In office 1660–1667

Member of Parliament for Christchurch (UK Parliament constituency)
- In office 1661 – August 1679

Gentleman of the Privy Chamber
- In office 1668–1685

Recusancy Commission
- In office March 1675 – July 1675

Personal details
- Born: 22 January 1612 Edmonton, Middlesex
- Died: 10 November 1685 (aged 73) London
- Resting place: possibly Henry VII Chapel, Westminster Abbey
- Spouse: Clare Arundell
- Relations: Sir Humphrey Weld, Thomas Arundell, 1st Baron Arundell of Wardour, 2nd Earl of Carlingford, Sir John Weld (died 1681)
- Children: Mary Weld Lady Carlingford
- Parent(s): Sir John Weld; Frances Whitmore
- Education: Trinity College, Cambridge
- Occupation: Lawyer, landowner, art collector and politician

Humphrey Weld (22 January 1612 – 1685), DL, JP was an English lawyer, member of the Royal household, public official, landowner and property administrator who was elected to the House of Commons for Christchurch in Hampshire in 1661. Weld was a crypto-recusant who kept his religious allegiance secret in order to stay in public office during a turbulent political period in English history. He was appointed Cup-bearer to the Catholic Queen Henrietta Maria 1639-44 and later as Gentleman of the Privy Chamber 1668-85 under her son, Charles II. He served as a magistrate and in numerous other public roles in London, Middlesex, Cambridgeshire, Hampshire and in Dorset, where he was governor of Portland Castle. In 1641 he bought the Lulworth Estate in Dorset where he started the "Lulworth" line of the (recusant) Weld family which has continued for over 350 years.

== Background ==
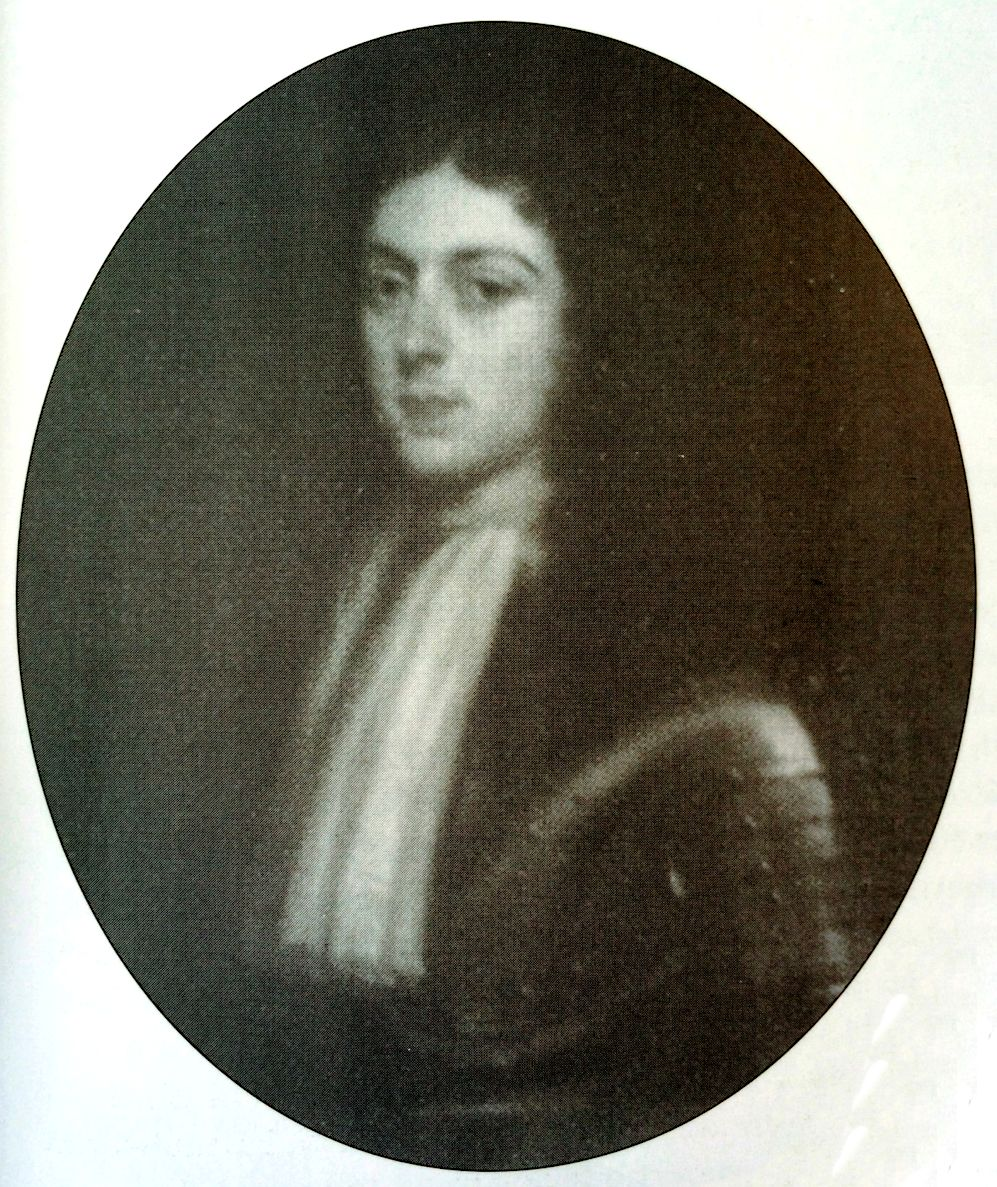
Sir John Weld (1585-1622), father of Humphrey

Weld was the first surviving son of Sir John Weld of Arnolds, Edmonton, Middlesex and Frances née Whitmore of Apley Park, Shropshire. The Whitmores and the Welds intermarried over several generations. His paternal grandfather and namesake was Sir Humphrey Weld, a merchant originally from Shropshire and Lord Mayor of London. Weld graduated in Law from Trinity College, Cambridge in 1629 and was admitted to the Inner Temple in 1631. Between 1633 and 1636 he went on a Grand Tour of Europe. Weld's parents and sisters were apparently committed Protestants, but he and his two brothers married into prominent Roman Catholic families and changed their religious adherence.

== Life ==
On his return to London from the Continent, Humphrey Weld was quickly appointed to the Queen's household as Cup-bearer in 1639 and began his official career. In 1641 he was assessed as a recusant for the London Poll tax. Correspondence between Weld and the secular English Catholic priest, Peter Biddulph, alias 'Fitton' (b. 1600), stationed in Rome, suggests they would have first met in Europe and kept a long association based on the older man's religious influence and connoisseurship of art which led to Weld himself becoming a collector.

=== Property portfolio ===
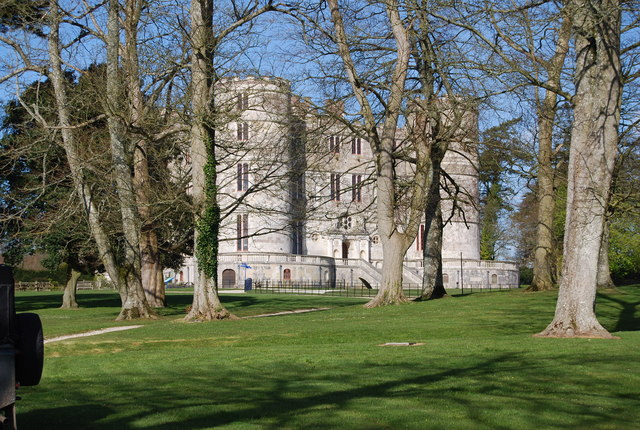
Lulworth Castle, Dorset

Weld had acquired a newly built mansion in Aldwych Close on 25 February 1639 or 1640 for the sum of £2,600. He named the large property at the back of Drury Lane then just inside the county of Middlesex, "Weld House". In 1649 he bought out the rest of the Close and assigned it to his widowed mother, Frances, who three years later, reassigned it back to him. He drew rents from its wealthy occupants, including the ambassadors of France, Portugal and Spain over a number of years. In 1641, with the assistance of his brother Sir John Weld of Compton Bassett, he bought the vast Lulworth Manor and its castellated Mock castle from Thomas Howard, 3rd Viscount Howard of Bindon for £42,860. He spent most of the Civil War with the Court in Oxford, and he was at Worcester when the Cavalier garrison surrendered in 1646.

Meanwhile, his own property at Lulworth had been commandeered by a garrison of Roundheads who caused some damage to the fabric of the castle. Armed with a certificate of (Anglican) church attendance and of having received communion at St Giles in the Fields and at East Lulworth, he petitioned to collect on the damages to his properties during the civil conflict, but was instead fined £996, a moderate sum for him. Though he alleged damage to his property of £2,200 and debts of £12,400, he could still manage to afford to commission paintings from Europe ‘exquisitely done and by the best masters’. Since some of these were ‘pieces of devotion’, and since all his servants were recusants, the Dorset committee had sufficient grounds to exact from him the oath of abjuration, which he managed to evade. He had sufficiently purged his recusancy to be allowed to buy back the forfeited estates of his nephew, Henry Arundell, 3rd Baron Arundell of Wardour, and the Bedfordshire property of the Earl of Cleveland, which had been mortgaged to him.

=== Royal Conduit, controversialist and MP ===
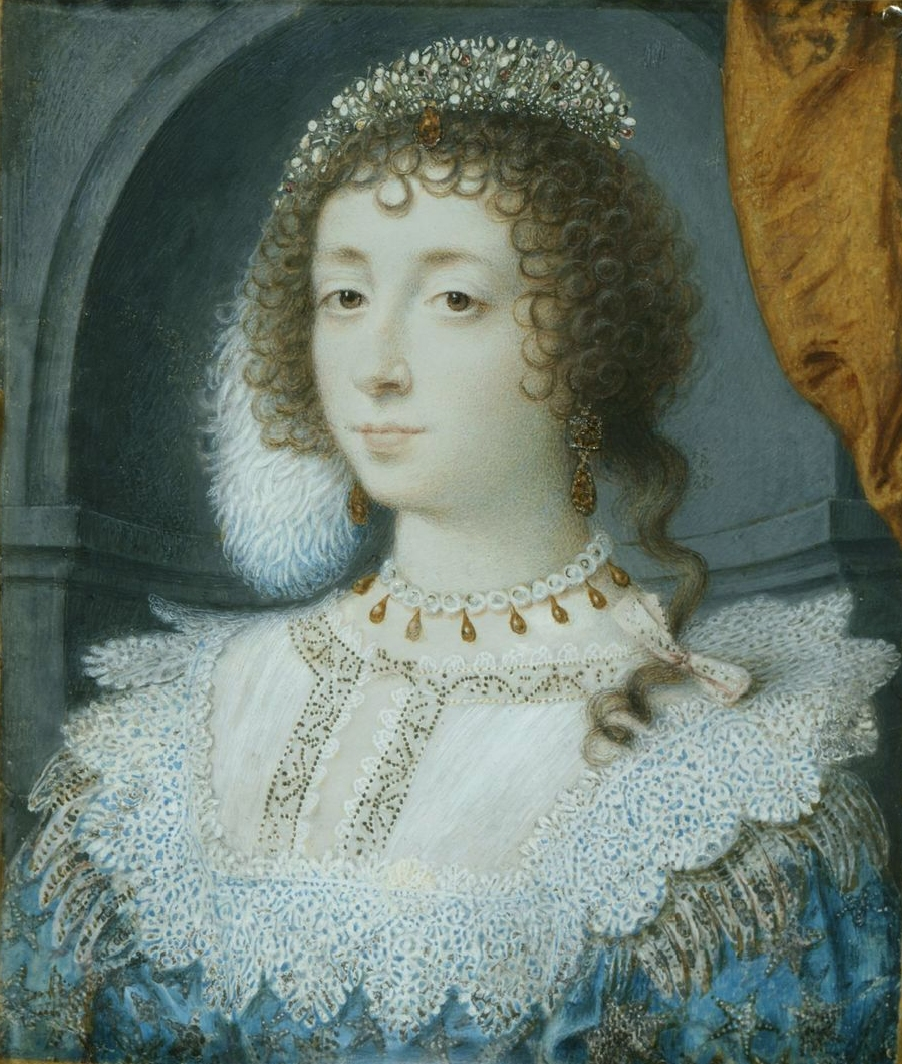
Queen Henrietta Maria, wife of Charles I of England

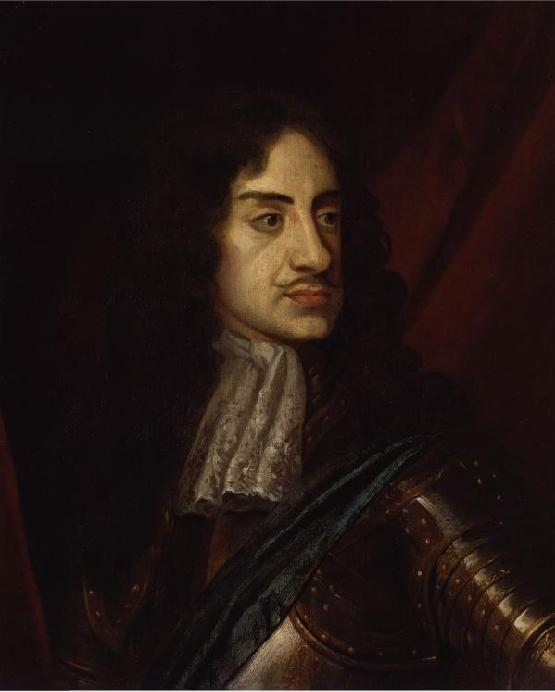
King Charles II (1665) anon.

At the Restoration of Charles II, Weld was made governor of Portland and granted a secret service pension of £1,000 p.a. for maintaining an underground correspondence between the King and the French Court. In 1661 he applied unsuccessfully to the electors of Wareham, six miles from Lulworth, but was returned to the Cavalier Parliament for Christchurch, where his wife and her sisters owned the manor. He had a Protestant Weld cousin in Parliament. Only five committees are attributed to him by full name, and he was probably a less active Member of the Cavalier Parliament than his cousin, George Weld. But as a Middlesex Justice of the peace he was both active and unpopular. Sir Richard Everard, 2nd Baronet complained that Weld's attitude towards those applying the laws against "Popery", ‘argues more affection to Babylon than to the crown of England’. As treasurer of the Middlesex workhouse, it was probably Weld rather than his cousin, Sir John Weld, who served on the committee for the additional Poor Law of 1664. Although listed as a court dependant, he lost the Dorset lieutenancy later in 1664, probably as a result of a dispute with Charles Stewart, 3rd Duke of Richmond over defences at Sandsfoot Castle, but after he petitioned government with local support, it was restored to him. In 1666, he took the chair for his brother's bill to permit foreclosure in 1667–8. He was given a royal court appointment as Gentleman of the Privy Chamber in 1668, a position he kept until his death, and his pension, which had been suspended, was also restored. On 15 May 1671 he complained that "Weld House" had been attacked by a mob yelling, ‘This is the grand justice that hangs and quarters us all’, and was saved by the chance arrival of a guard patrol.

=== Recusancy Commission ===
Weld was appointed to the first Hampshire 'recusancy commission' of 1675, but struck off four months later. Despite reservations about him, in 1677 Lord Shaftesbury nevertheless considered him ‘worthy’. In this period Weld had offered to 'discover' lands in Bedfordshire bequeathed to trustees for the benefit of the Roman Catholic Church. In 1678 he was probably appointed to the committee for the bill to enable the trustees of Sir Ralph Bankes to sell his lands. After consultation he pronounced on the spuriousness of the petition which led to yet further enquiries.

=== During the Popish Plot ===
During the Popish Plot, it was reported that Weld had been expelled from the House of Commons. Titus Oates swore that he had attended Mass with him at "Weld House", and that Weld had received a dispensation from the general of the Jesuits to "take the oaths and the Test", which would enable him ‘by his interest to hinder proceedings in Parliament against the Roman Catholics’. In his only recorded Commons speech, Weld said: ‘I desire to know what I am accused of. I never had Mass in my house in my life, nor went to an ambassador's house to hear Mass. Let any man spit in my face if he can prove it.’ Weld was on the court list of government supporters at this time, but not on the opposition list of the ‘unanimous club’.

The sale of the Lordship of the manor of Christchurch to Edward Hyde, 1st Earl of Clarendon meant Weld was left without a constituency, and he did not stand again. He procured a Certificate of conformity from St. Martin in the Fields, where his daughter was married to the Earl of Carlingford the following year, in 1663. However this did not prevent a search of his Middlesex property, "Weld House", which was partly let to the Spanish Embassy, or his dismissal from local office. He was forced to seek a loan by mortgaging his estates to Lord Folliot for £4,000, and five years later Weld was censured in court for debt.

== Offices held ==
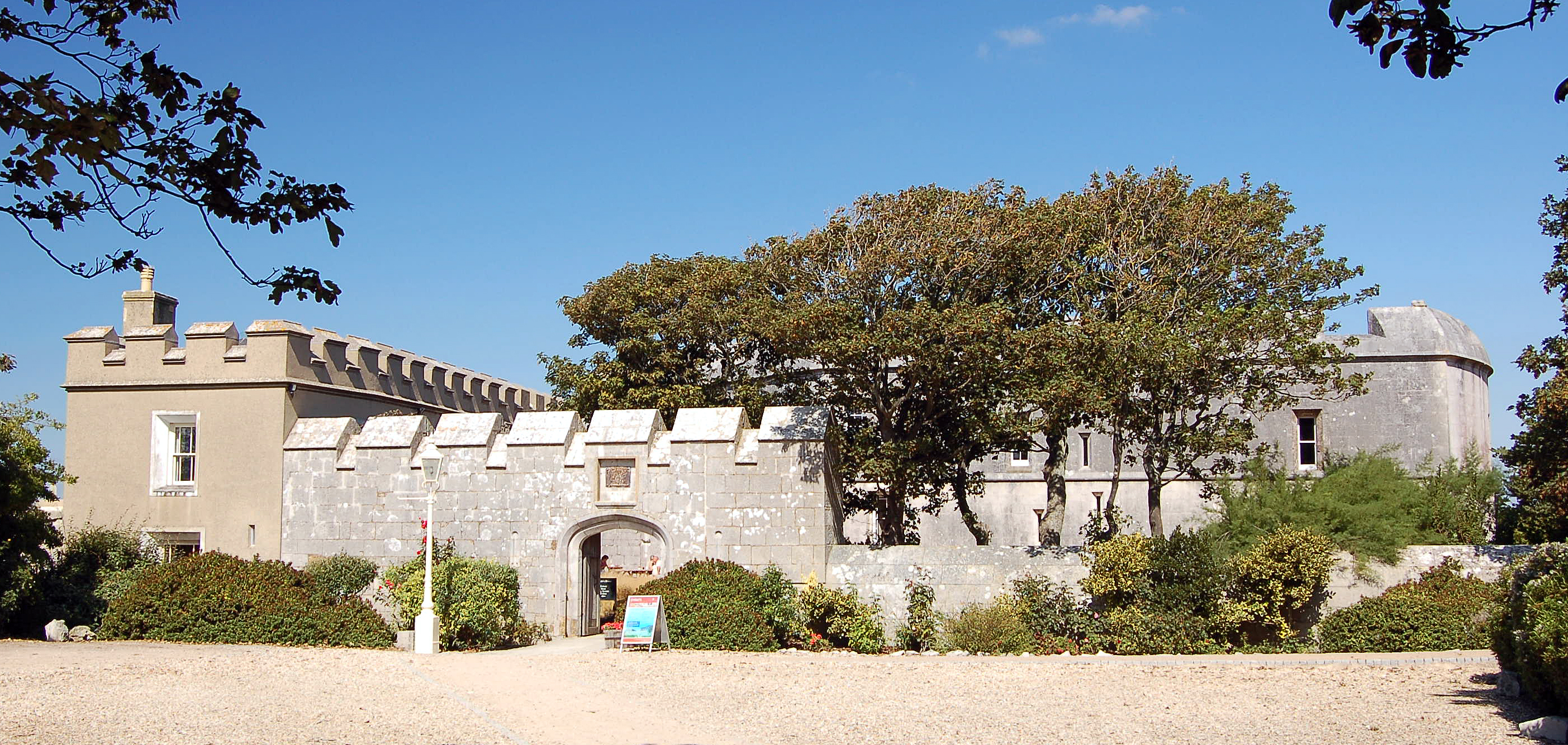
Entrance to outer courtyard of Portland Castle

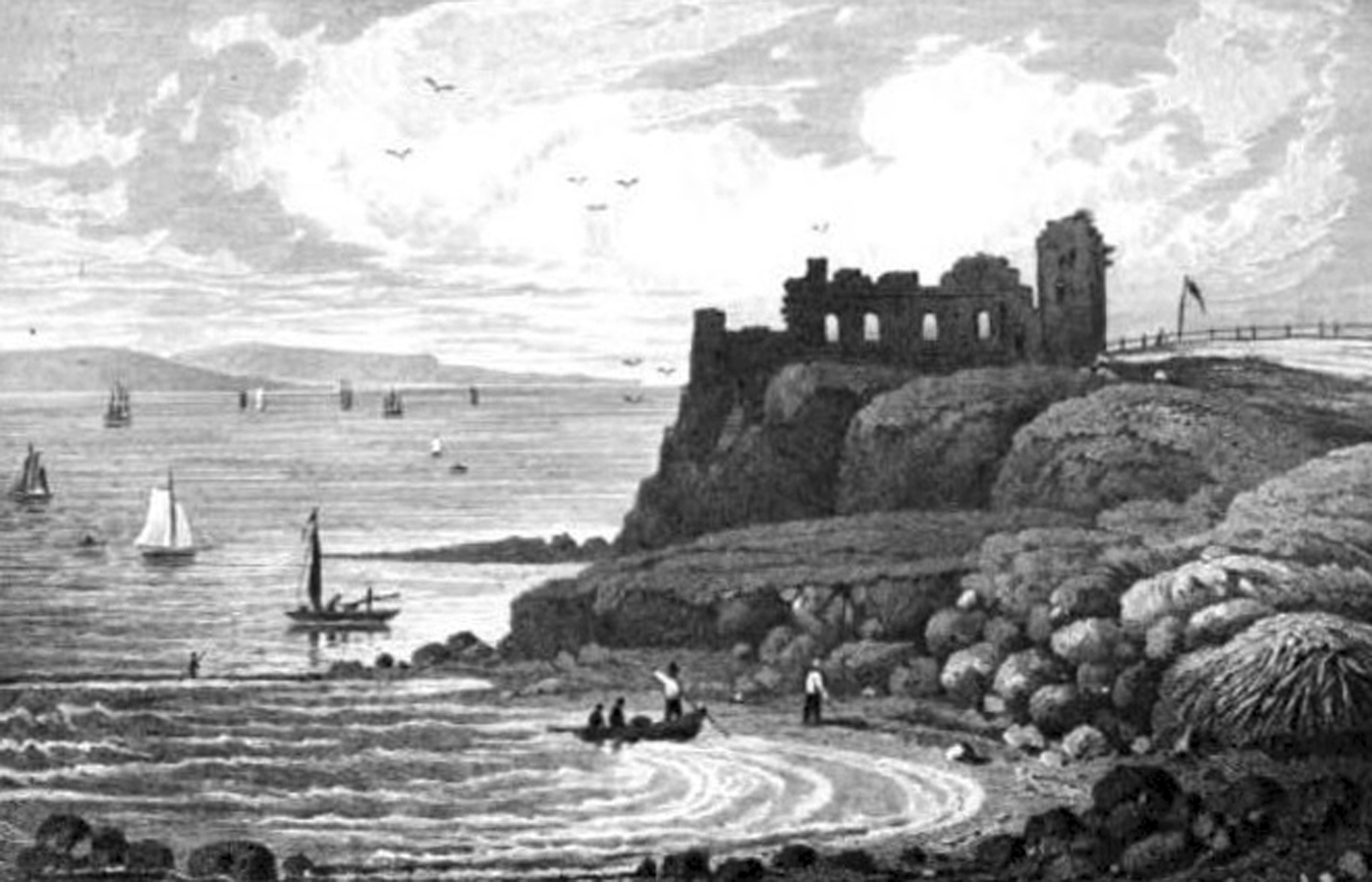
Engraving of Sandsfoot Castle, 1825

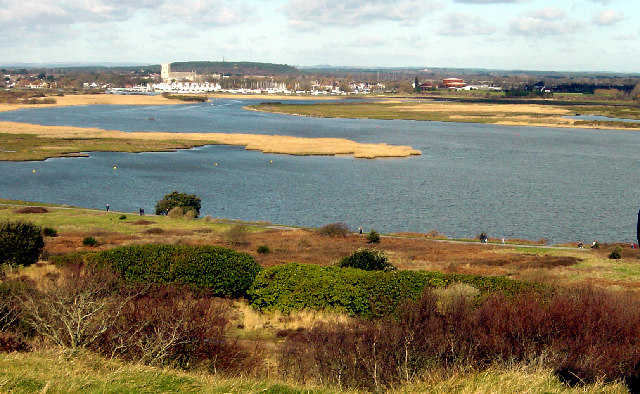
Christchurch Harbour, Dorset

- Justice of the peace Dorset, July 1660-79
- Justice of the peace Middlesex. August 1660-79
- Justice of the peace Cambridgeshire 1677-9
- Governor of Portland Castle September 1660-79
- Keeper of Sandsfoot Castle September 1660-5
- First Member of parliament for Christchurch, Hampshire 1661
- Commissioner for London 1661
- Freeman of Weymouth 1661
- Commissioner for assessment, Middlesex August 1661-79
- Commissioner for assessment, Hampshire and Dorset 1663-4
- Commissioner for assessment, Dorset 1667-79
- Commissioner for assessment, Cambridgeshire 1673-9
- Commissioner for assessment, loyal and indigent officers, Middlesex. 1662
- Commissioner for the foreshore, Dorset 1662
- Treasurer, corporation of the poor, Middlesex 1664
- Commissioner for assessment of recusants, Hampshire March–July 1675

=== Royal appointments ===
- Cup-bearer to Queen Henrietta Maria 1639-1644
- Deputy Lieutenant of Dorset 1665-79
- Gentleman of the Privy Chamber 1668-85

== Family ==
In 1639, Weld married Clare (died 1691), daughter of Thomas Arundell, 1st Baron Arundell of Wardour. They had one daughter, Mary. She married Nicholas Taaffe, 2nd Earl of Carlingford. After his death, aged 73, Weld was said to have been buried in the Henry VII Chapel of Westminster Abbey in November 1685, in a presumed secret Roman Catholic service, as there is no entry in the register. His heir was his nephew, William, son of Sir John Weld of Compton Bassett, and his wife, Mary, daughter of William Stourton, 11th Baron Stourton, his co-religionists. William married Elizabeth Shireburn and their first son and heir was Humphrey (died 1722).

== See also ==
- Edward Weld (Senior)
- Edward Weld
- Thomas Weld (of Lulworth)
- Herbert Weld Blundell
- Wilfrid Weld

Parliament of England
Preceded by John Hildesley	Member of Parliament for Christchurch (UK Parliament constituency); 1661–1679; With: Henry Tulse 1661	Succeeded by Sir Thomas Clarges
