= Joseph William Weld =

British army officer and landowner

Sir Joseph William Weld TD OBE
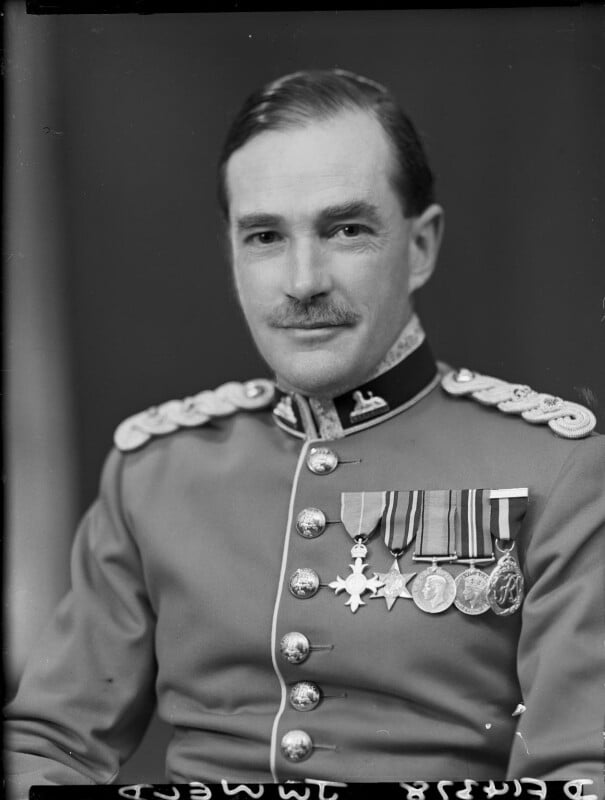
- Weld in 1951

Lord Lieutenant of Dorset
- In office 1964–1984
- Monarch: Elizabeth II
- Preceded by: Edward Digby, 11th Baron Digby
- Succeeded by: Edward Digby, 12th Baron Digby

Personal details
- Born: Joseph William Weld; 1909
- Spouse: Elizabeth Bellord
- Awards: OBE, TD, KB

Colonel Sir Joseph William Weld, OBE, TD (1909-1992), was Lord Lieutenant of Dorset, a British army officer and landowner. A direct descendant of Sir Humphrey Weld (died 1610), and member of a noted recusant family, he became owner of the Lulworth Estate and Lulworth Castle in Dorset, in 1935 after the death of his cousin, Herbert Weld Blundell. He volunteered for the Territorial Army.

From 1942 to 1943 he was the first Territorial officer to be on the permanent staff of the Staff College, Camberley, Surrey. During World War II he had a distinguished career in the army. He served as adjutant to Lord Louis Montbatten and in that connection made several trips as Liaison officer between the South East Asia Command and the War Cabinet.

Following D-Day, he escorted Edwina Mountbatten on her visit to France to inspect field hospitals behind the advancing allied armies. Although General Eisenhower had flown them across the English Channel in his Flying Fortress, Lady Mountbatten insisted on getting close to the front line. They had to transfer to a smaller aircraft, but on the way to Nijmegen the low flying plane strayed over German lines. One engine was shot out, but the pilot succeeded in gliding and landing the party in safety. Weld was appointed an OBE in 1946 in recognition of his service.

After the war he reformed the Dorset Regiment's 4th Battalion which he commanded until 1951. On retirement, he became its Honorary Colonel. That same year he served as High Sheriff of Dorset.

Between 1964 and 1984 he was Lord Lieutenant for the county of Dorset. He was Chairman of Police Authority between 1960 and 1980. He was knighted for public services in Dorset in the Queen's 1973 Birthday Honours.

As a landowner, he divested some of the Weld family's valuable art collection to finance improvements to farms on his estate.

He handed the management of the estate to his son and heir, Wilfrid Weld when he and his wife, Elizabeth, retired. Weld died in August 1992 and the funeral was held at St Mary's Chapel on the Lulworth Estate, which he had restored in the 1950s. The Queen was represented at the ceremony by Lord Digby, Weld's successor as Lord Lieutenant of Dorset.
