= Dorset History Centre =

The Dorset History Centre (formerly Dorset Record Office) is the archive service for the county of Dorset, England. It collects, stores, preserves and makes available documents relating to the history of Dorset. It is a local authority archive service, jointly funded by Dorset Council, and Bournemouth, Christchurch and Poole Council, serving both authorities. The oldest document in the archives is from 965 AD.

The Dorset History Centre has scored consistently well in The National Archives Self Assessment programme, which evaluates local authority archive services on a number of key indicators. It received a 4* rating in 2010 – the highest rating which can be awarded.

== History ==
Dorset Record Office was founded in 1955, and based at the County Hall in Dorchester. It expanded through the remainder of the 1950s by taking in the archives stored at the Dorset County Museum, and becoming the Diocesan Record Office in 1959. The Record Office continued to be based at County Hall through the 1960s, 1970s and 1980s, with a new research room being added in 1971. In 1991 a new purpose-built office was opened on Bridport Road in Dorchester, with approximately 6 miles of shelving capacity in environmentally controlled repositories, including a special storage area for modern media. In 1997, the Record Office became the joint archives service for Dorset, Bournemouth and Poole councils. The county's Local Studies Library was moved into the record office building in 2005, at which point it became the Dorset History Centre.

== Collections ==
The Dorset History Centre holds a wide range of archive collections created by organisations, families or businesses based in Dorset. It holds records for the Church of England parishes in Dorset, including parish registers of baptisms, marriages and burials. It also holds some records for other denominations. The Centre also holds the historical records of the Unitary Councils and the former County Council, District and Borough councils and predecessor bodies. Other such public bodies represented in the collections include the local courts, prisons and hospitals. The oldest document in the collection is a charter from the Saxon king Edgar granting land in Cheselbourne which dates from 965 AD.

Notable author and artist archives include:

- Thomas Hardy
- Elisabeth Frink
- Sylvia Townsend Warner and Valentine Ackland
- William Barnes
- Reynolds Stone
- Mary Spencer Watson
- John Makepeace

Business archives include:

- Poole Pottery
- Gundry of Bridport, rope makers
- Stewards of Ferndown, plantsmen and garden centre
- Eldridge Pope of Dorchester, brewers
- Cosens of Weymouth, paddle steamer operator
- Beales Department Stores
- Bournemouth Transport Limited/Yellow Buses

Family and estate collections include:

- Bankes family of Kingston Lacy, including the travel papers of William John Bankes
- Fox-Strangways family, Earls of Ilchester
- Weld family of Lulworth Castle

Additionally it holds two library collections. The first is the Local Studies Library, which includes books, magazines and journals on the history of the county on the region. The other is the Dorset Authors Collection – books by (and about) Dorset writers including Thomas Hardy, William Barnes and the Powys brothers.

== Services ==
The Dorset History Centre is open 9am - 5pm Wednesday to Friday and 9am - 4:30pm every first Saturday of the month. There is a by appointment search room for requesting and viewing original documents, a microfilm room, library and study areas and computers for public use.

The Dorset History Centre was one of the first archive services to go into partnership with a commercial organisation in order to digitise a significant percentage of its records and make these available online. The first set of Dorset records were released by Ancestry.com in summer 2011.

Aside from its enquiry service, the History Centre also offer talks and group visits, learning sessions for schools or further and higher education bodies, copying of documents and a paid research service for people unable to visit in person. The History Centre also has a conservation lab which supports its preservation objectives.
