= Giuntini =

Giuntini is a surname. Notable people with the surname include:

- Lorenzo Giuntini (c. 1843-1920), English plaster modeler
- Osvaldo Giuntini (1936–2025), Brazilian Roman Catholic prelate

== See also ==
- Giuntini Project
