= Wilfrid Weld =

British landowner

Wilfrid Joseph Weld ( 1934 – 3 December 2015 Tahiti) was a British landowner. He was a member of the Weld family of Lulworth Castle, a direct descendant of Sir Humphrey Weld and son of Col. Sir Joseph William Weld and Elizabeth, née Bellord. Like his father before him, Weld served in 1996 as High Sheriff of Dorset.

He is credited with the restoration of the fire gutted Listed monument in Dorset and turning the family heirloom dating from 1641, into a popular visitor attraction. Under his stewardship, Lulworth Cove and Durdle Door, on his estate and part of the Jurassic Coast, were declared a UNESCO World Heritage Site. He was a supporter of many local charities and sporting associations.
