= Herbert Weld Blundell =

Herbert Joseph Weld Blundell (1852 – 5 February 1935) was an English traveller in Africa, archaeologist, philanthropist and yachtsman. He shortened his surname from Weld Blundell to Weld, in 1924.

== Life to 1922 ==
He was educated at Stonyhurst College. He travelled to Persia in 1891, then for a decade 1894 to 1905 in North Africa and East Africa. He was a correspondent for the Morning Post during the Second Boer War. Expeditions included

- 1891-2 Persepolis, with Lorenzo Giuntini, making casts of the reliefs
- 1894-5 Libya and Cyrenaica, creating a photographic record
- 1898 Abyssinia Expedition with Lord Lovat and Reginald Koettlitz
- 1904-5 Around Addis Ababa
- 1922 Weld Blundell Expedition, found the Weld-Blundell Prism, now in the Ashmolean Museum

In 1921–1922 he presented the Weld Blundell Collection to the University of Oxford.

== From 1923 ==
He backed a 1923 expedition to the Yemen, and the Field Museum-Oxford University Joint Expedition to Mesopotamia (Kish).

In 1923 he married Theodora Mclaren-Morrison, who died in 1928. In the same year he inherited Lulworth Castle, from a cousin, Reginald Joseph Weld Blundell. In 1928, on the death of Reginald's brother Humphrey, he inherited the rest of the Lulworth Estate, of the Weld-Blundell family.

In 1923 he started campaigning against Army use of Bindon Hill as a firing range, the beginning of the long conflict that centred on the fate of Tyneham and other parts of the Lulworth Estate. From 1924 he owned a large yacht, S/Y Lulworth. It was a prominent racing craft of its time, competing 28 times in 1925 and always placing in the first three.

In 1929, Weld's intention to sell two family heirlooms, the Luttrell Psalter and the Bedford Book of Hours at Sotheby's came up against a legal issue, when just three days before these famous illuminated manuscripts were due to go under the hammer, it was discovered by British Museum lawyers that they and all the heirlooms and 'chattels' in Lulworth Castle were apparently the property of Mrs Mary Angela Noyes, née Mayne, wife of the poet Alfred Noyes, earlier married to Richard Shireburn Weld-Blundell, the Weld-Blundell heir who had been killed in 1916. Weld went to court, but his appeal was rejected only a few hours before the sale. The British Museum then purchased both manuscripts from Mrs Noyes with a loan from John Pierpont Morgan. Later in 1929 Lulworth Castle was badly damaged by fire, and some of the disputed heirlooms were burned. Upon his death, the Lulworth Estate passed to a cousin, Joseph William Weld, subsequently a Lord Lieutenant of Dorset.

== Works ==
- The Royal Chronicle of Abyssinia, 1769–1840, with Translation and Notes (1922)
