= East Lulworth =

Hamlet in Dorset, England

Coordinates: 50.6394°N 2.1995°W

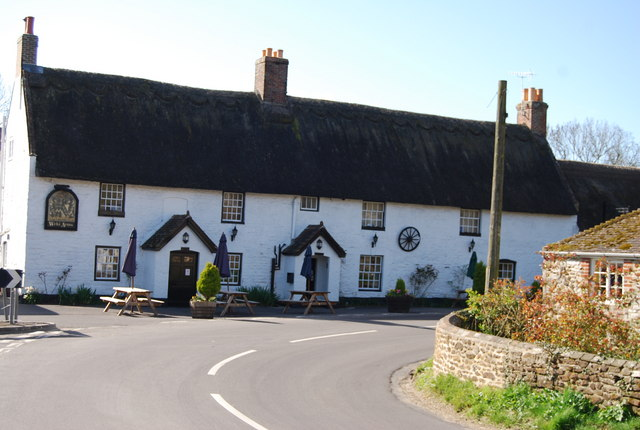
- The Weld Arms

- Location within Dorset
- Population: 241 (2021)
- OS grid reference: SY860822
- Civil parish: East Lulworth
- Unitary authority: Dorset
- Ceremonial county: Dorset
- Region: South West
- Country: England
- Sovereign state: United Kingdom
- Post town: Wareham
- Postcode district: BH20
- Police: Dorset
- Fire: Dorset and Wiltshire
- Ambulance: South Western
- UK Parliament: South Dorset

East Lulworth is a village and civil parish nine miles east of Dorchester, near Lulworth Cove, in the county of Dorset, England. The village, which consists of 17th-century thatched cottages, is dominated by the barracks of the Royal Armoured Corps Gunnery School who use a portion of the Purbeck Hills as a gunnery range. The parish population recorded at the 2021 census was 241.

An area east of the village is known as Whiteway.

The nearby Lulworth Estate grounds contain the first Roman Catholic chapel to be built after the Protestant Reformation. It was designed in 1786 by John Tasker in the form of a Greek mausoleum at a cost of £2,380 and was the private chapel of the recusant Weld family. The Weld-Blundell family, formerly owners of the estate, were descendants of the Welds.

The Church of England parish church is dedicated to St. Andrew. Only the perpendicular tower and octagonal font are original from the medieval building; the rest of the church was rebuilt in 1864 to designs of John Hicks, who also designed East Holme church. The church is a Grade II* listed building.

Henry Rolls (1803–1877) was a shoemaker who taught himself to read and write. He kept a journal of the main happenings of village life from 1824 until 1877. After Henry's death, his son George Rolls (1846–1929) continued the journal, covering the period from 1877 to 1928. George's daughter Agnes Mary Rolls (1879–1961) took over responsibility for the journal from 1929 to 1955.

== See also ==
- West Lulworth
