= Lorenzo Giuntini =

Andrew Lawrence (“Lorenzo”) Giuntini was born ca. 1843 in Cheltenham, Gloucestershire, England. His father, Andrea Giuntini, was born ca. 1808 in Italy and, having immigrated to England, married Mary Woulds on 12 May 1839 in Lincoln. Lorenzo Giuntini married Susannah Louisa Barnett on 11 September 1866 in Frome, Somerset and had 8 children. He died in London on 29 December 1920.

How Lorenzo Giuntini looked some years before meeting Alfred Maudslay

Lorenzo Giuntini was a plaster modeller. This was a family gift, as his father, brothers and sons had the same profession. Lorenzo worked at one time for a known firm in the field, Brucciani (Brucciani D, &Co. Ltd, 40 Russel street, Covent Garden).

Lorenzo Giuntini took part in several archaeological expeditions:

- in 1883 et 1885, in Quiriguá (Guatemala) and Copán (Honduras) with Alfred Maudslay, where he made plaster moulds of low-reliefs
- in 1892 in Persepolis with Herbert Weld-Blundell: the plaster was replaced by "papier-mâché", due to transport difficulties.

These expeditions were covered by articles in the Times on 19 August 1893, 9 September 1892 and 27 November 1898.

Some of Lorenzo's casts are displayed in the British Museum
