= Portland Castle =

16th-century English artillery fort

- Dorset, England
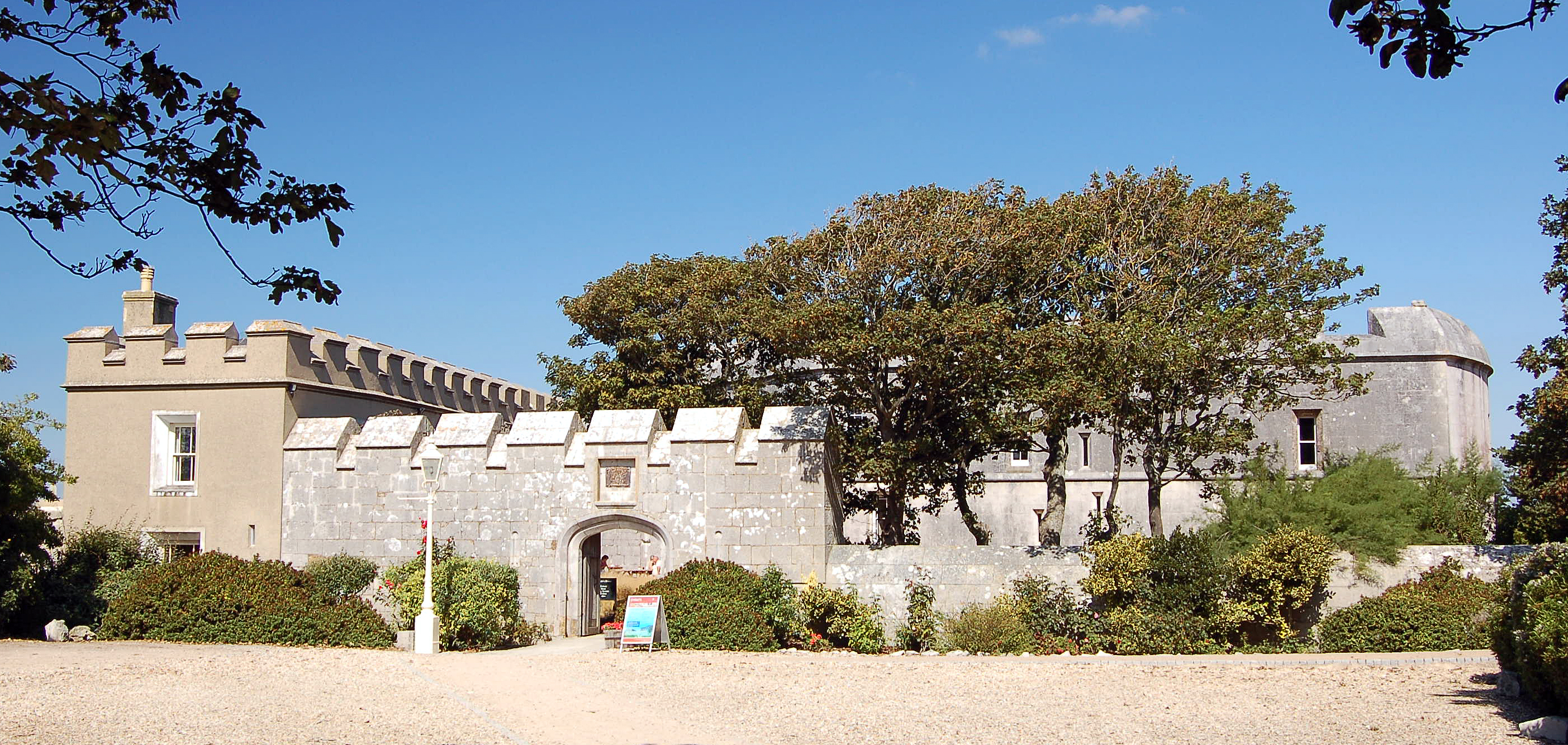
- The entrance to the outer courtyard

Site information
- Type: Device Fort
- Owner: English Heritage
- Open to the public: Yes
- Condition: Intact

Location
- Shown in Dorset
- Location within Dorset
- Coordinates: 50°34′06″N 02°26′48″W

Site history
- Built: 1539–41
- In use: 1949
- Materials: Portland stone
- Events: English Civil War; First Anglo-Dutch War

Scheduled monument
- Official name: Portland Castle
- Designated: 9 October 1981
- Reference no.: 1015326

Listed Building – Grade I
- Official name: Portland Castle
- Designated: 17 May 1993
- Reference no.: 1205262

Portland Castle is an artillery fort constructed by Henry VIII on the Isle of Portland, Dorset, between 1539 and 1541. It formed part of the King's Device programme to protect against invasion from France and the Holy Roman Empire, and defended the Portland Roads anchorage. The fan-shaped castle was built from Portland stone, with a curved central tower and a gun battery, flanked by two angular wings. Shortly after its construction it was armed with eleven artillery pieces, intended for use against enemy shipping, operating in partnership with its sister castle of Sandsfoot on the other side of the anchorage. During the English Civil War, Portland was taken by the Royalist supporters of King Charles I, and then survived two sieges before finally surrendering to Parliament in 1646.

Portland continued to be used as a fort until the end of the Napoleonic Wars in 1815, when it was converted into a private house. Fresh concerns over invasion led to the War Office taking it over once again in 1869, but the castle was not rearmed and was instead formed as accommodation for more modern neighbouring fortifications. During the First and Second World Wars it was used as offices, accommodation and as an ordnance store. In 1949, the War Office relinquished control, and in 1955 it was opened to the public by the state. In the 21st century it is managed by English Heritage and operated as a tourist attraction, receiving 22,207 visitors in 2010. Historic England consider the castle to form "one of the best preserved and best known examples" of King Henry's forts.

== History ==
=== 16th century ===
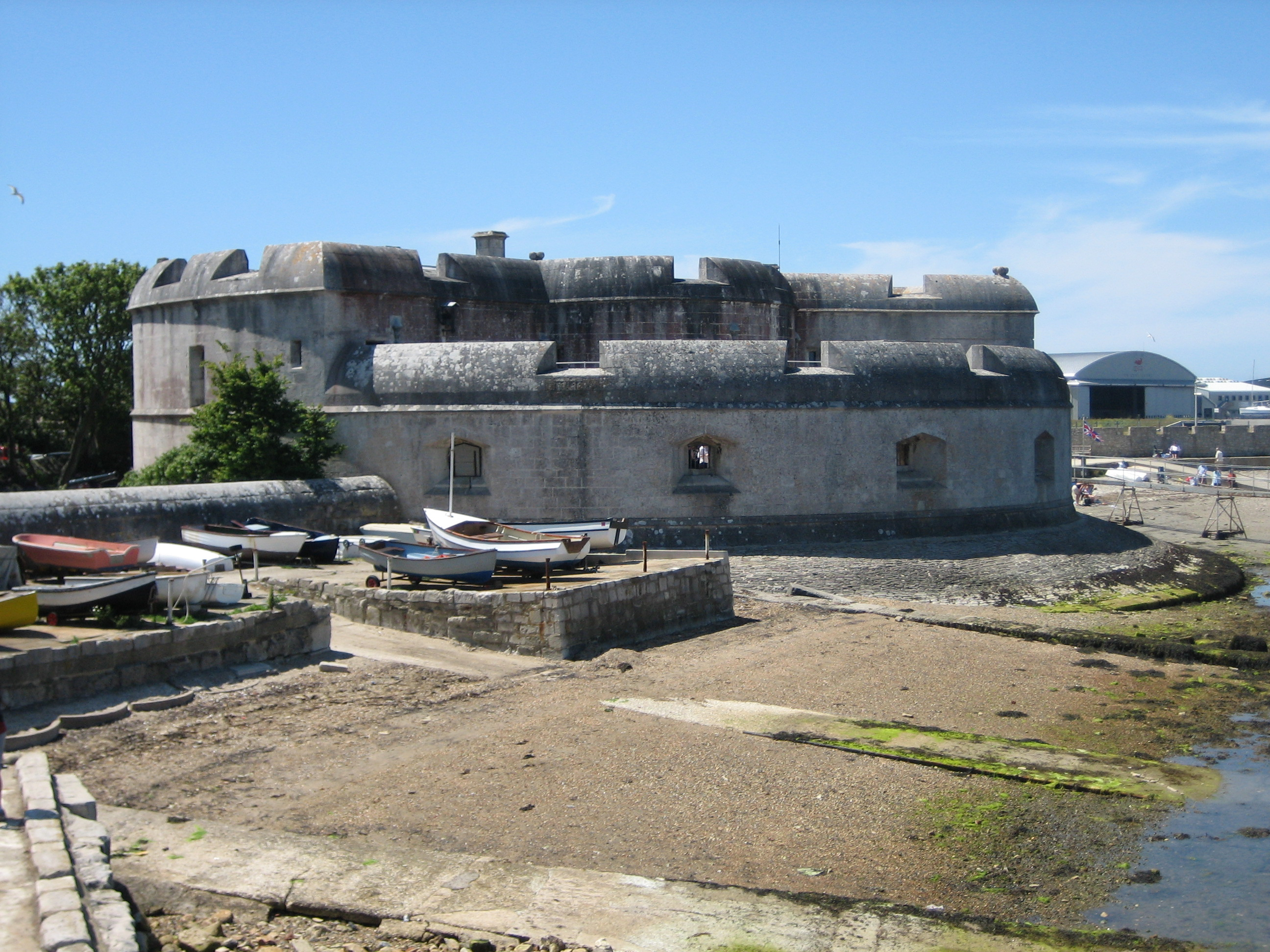
The keep seen from the harbour

Portland Castle was built as a consequence of international tensions between England, France and the Holy Roman Empire in the final years of the reign of Henry VIII. Traditionally the Crown had left coastal defences to the local lords and communities, only taking a modest role in building and maintaining fortifications, and while France and the Empire remained in conflict with one another, maritime raids were common but an actual invasion of England seemed unlikely. Basic defences, based around simple blockhouses and towers, existed in the south-west and along the Sussex coast, with a few more impressive works in the north of England, but in general the fortifications were very limited in scale.

In 1533, Henry broke with Pope Paul III in order to annul the long-standing marriage to his wife, Catherine of Aragon and remarry. Catherine was the aunt of Charles V, the Holy Roman Emperor, and he took the annulment as a personal insult. This resulted in France and the Empire declaring an alliance against Henry in 1538, and the Pope encouraging the two countries to attack England. An invasion of England appeared certain. In response, Henry issued an order, called a "device", in 1539, giving instructions for the "defence of the realm in time of invasion" and the construction of forts along the English coastline.

As a consequence, Lord Russell inspected the coast along an anchorage known as Portland Roads, and concluded that two castles, Portland and Sandsfoot, should be constructed to protect it from naval attack. Work began that summer, with Oliver Lawrence acting as the royal paymaster for the project, and was completed by 1541, at a cost of £4,964. (Note: Comparing early modern costs and prices with those of the modern period is challenging. £4,964 in 1541 could be equivalent to between £2.4 million and £1,175 million in 2014, depending on the price comparison used, and £228 in 1585 to between £55,000 and £23.5 million. For comparison, the total royal expenditure on all the Device Forts across England between 1539 and 1547 came to £376,500, with St Mawes, for example, costing £5,018, and Sandgate £5,584.) Thomas Mervin was appointed as captain, with a garrison of four gunners and two other men. In 1545, Mervin was replaced by John Leweston, who also took on responsibilities as the Lieutenant of Portland, along with a larger garrison of 13 men, paid for out of the proceeds of the recent Dissolution of the Monasteries. A survey between 1547 and 1548 reported that the castle was equipped with one brass demi-cannon, two brass demi-culverins, four breech-loading portpieces and four slings; it also held eight hagbushes–a type of early arquebus–along with twenty-three bows, twenty-nine bills and twelve pikes.

The threat of a French invasion passed, and peace was declared in 1558. Attention shifted away from Portland, and a 1574 survey reported that the castle was in a poor condition, with similar concerns being repeated in 1583. Tensions with Spain grew and military attention focused on the threat to the south-west of England. War broke out in 1585, and £228 was spent on renovating Portland Castle. In 1596, the garrison still comprised a captain and 13 men.

=== 17th–19th centuries ===
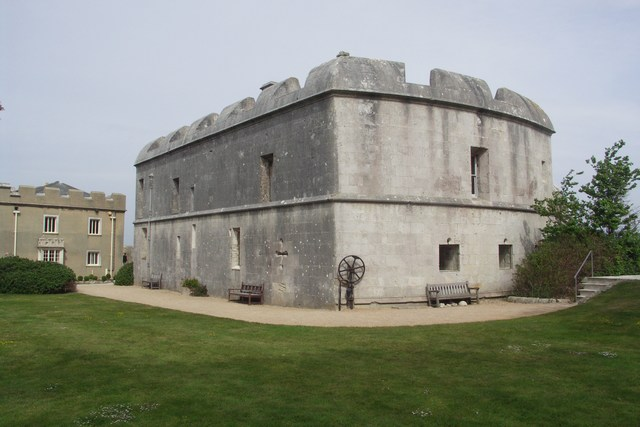
The keep (centre) and the Captain's House (left) seen from the courtyard

In the early 1600s, England was at peace with France and Spain and the coastal forts, included Portland, received little attention. A 1623 survey reported that the castle was equipped with three culverins, nine demi-culverins and a saker, but that the fortifications had suffered badly from sea erosion and required extensive repairs. Fourteen years later, the castle had 15 guns and a garrison of a captain and 12 men.

When the English Civil War broke out in 1642, Portland was initially controlled by Parliamentary forces. The castle was captured in 1643 by a group of Royalists who gained access by pretending to be Parliamentary soldiers. As the war turned against the King in the south-west, Parliamentary forces besieged the castle for four months in 1644, and once again the following year. The castle finally surrendered to Vice-Admiral William Batten in April 1646. It is uncertain why the castle, which was not easily defensible on the landward side, proved so difficult to take; the historian Peter Harrington has suggested that its low-lying position may have made it difficult for Parliament to bombard it from the sea.

During the Interregnum, Portland Castle continued to be garrisoned and used a prison, with a unit of 103 men attached to it in 1651. It was used to defend the Portland Roads during the First Anglo-Dutch War of 1653, seeing action in a three-day long naval battle between English and Dutch forces. When Charles II returned to the throne in 1660, he reduced the garrison to its pre-war levels but repaired the fortifications in the light of the continuing Dutch threat; in 1676 the castle was equipped with 16 guns.

Portland Castle continued in use through the 18th century, primarily protecting vessels against privateers, including merchant vessels carrying stone from the local Portland quarries. Reports in 1702 and 1715 complained about the dilapidated condition of the fortification – the sea had washed away 112 feet (34 m) of its foundations – and the number of artillery pieces was reduced to seven. By 1779, the castle had a caretaker garrison of three men and eight guns, and reportedly had not been repaired in the previous 30 years. During the Napoleonic Wars, the castle's guns were increased to comprise six 24-pounder, six 12-pounders and two 9-pounder guns (10.9 kg, 5.4 kg and 4.1 kg respectively), but the fortification remained in a poor condition overall.

Following the final defeat of Napoleon, the castle was disarmed and leased to John Manning, a Portland churchman, who converted it from a fortress into a private house. John's son, Charles Manning, took over the house in 1834 and continued to develop it. Among the Mannings' work was the conversion of an older house alongside the main castle, which had once housed the master gunner, into a grander property, known today as the Captain's House. In the late 1840s, the Portland Roads were converted into an artificial harbour through the construction of a breakwater, and new forts were built on the Verne heights and the sea front to protect it, although the structure of the old castle itself was left untouched by the growing complex of forts. Charles died in 1869 and, amid ongoing invasion fears, the War Office took over the castle again for use as accommodation for commissioned officers, including as a house for the adjutant of the Verne Citadel.

=== 20th–21st centuries ===
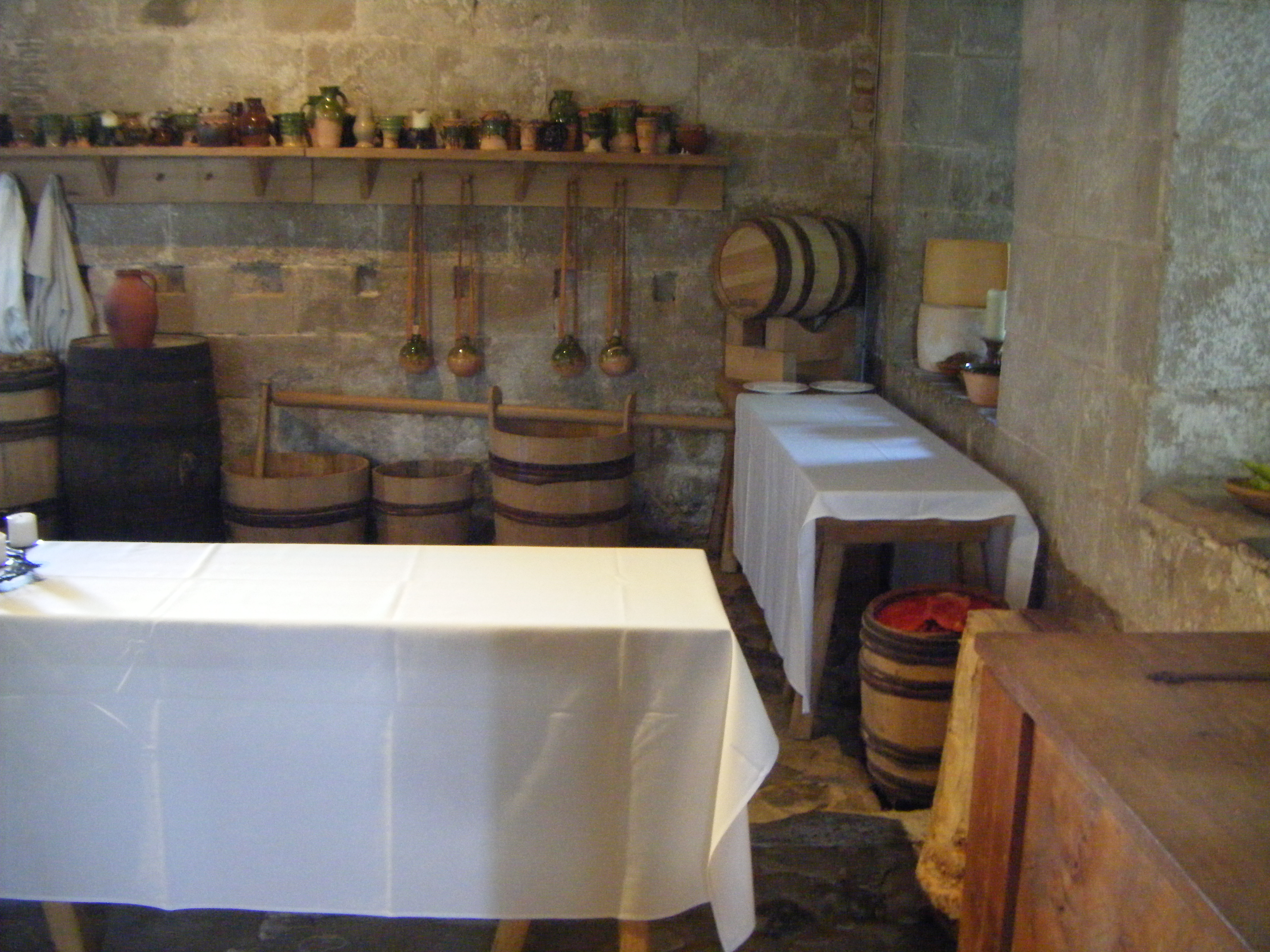
The restored 16th-century kitchen

In the early years of the 20th century, the War Office and the Office of Works held discussions on how to manage the castle. In 1908, Portland was placed onto what was known as the Schedule C list, which meant that the Army would continue to use and manage the historic property, but with input on repairs from the Office of Works. With the outbreak of the First World War in 1914, Portland Harbour became an important naval base and the castle was used an ordnance store. The castle became a military residence again in the interwar years, and during the Second World War it was used for accommodation and offices by British and US soldiers, with part of the castle used once again for storing ordnance. A concrete pillbox, since demolished, was constructed alongside the castle early on in the war.

After the conflict, Portland Castle was transferred to the Ministry of Works in 1949 and opened to the public in 1955. The Ministry decided to present the interior as it might have looked in the 16th century and removed most of the 19th- and 20th-century additions and changes. The Captain's House and the adjacent gardens were used by the neighbouring HMS Osprey helicopter base until 1999, but with the facility's closure, this part of the fort was also opened to visitors, the house being turned into a visitor facility.

In the 21st century the castle is operated by English Heritage as a tourist attraction, receiving 22,207 visitors in 2010. The main castle is protected under UK law as a Grade I listed building, and the Captain's House as a Grade II* building. 2023 saw the highest ever amount of annual visitors to Portland Castle of 30,000.

== Architecture ==
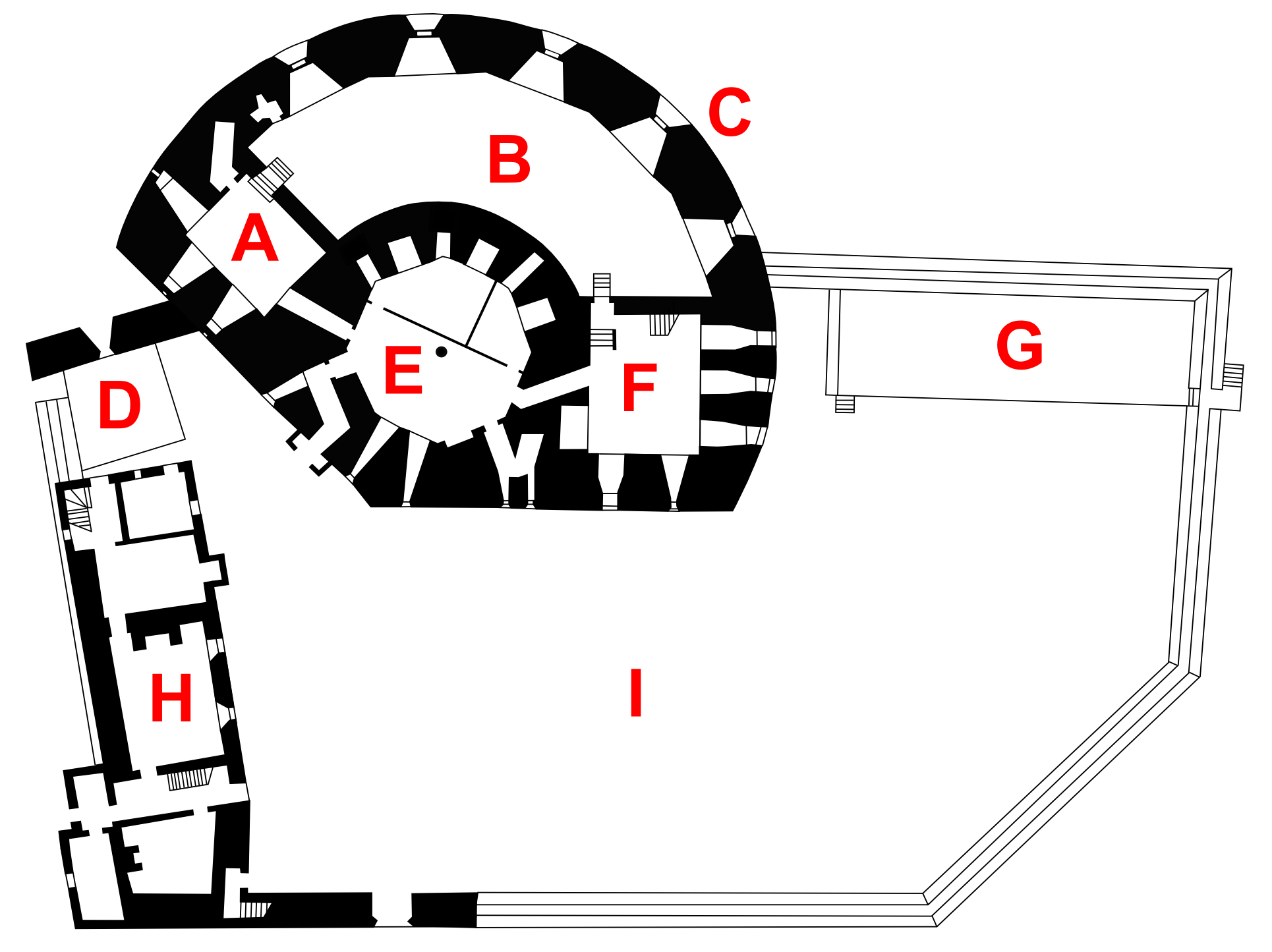
Plan of the castle; A – gunners' quarters; B – gun room; C – keep; D – gun platform; E – great hall; F – kitchen; G – gun platform; H – captain's house; I – courtyard

The heart of the castle is the keep, 120 feet (37 m) across, comprising a central tower with two wings on either side and a gun battery to the front, together forming an unusual, fan-shaped design overlooking the sea. This is surrounded by a walled courtyard, approximately 170 by 90 feet (52 by 27 m), with two gun platforms on either side of the keep. The Captain's House occupies the western side of the courtyard, and the Governor's Garden lies beyond the eastern wall. The castle is entered through an outer gateway on the southern side, surmounted by Charles II's coat of arms.

When first built, the castle would have held three tiers of artillery, two in the front battery and a third layer in the central tower. The keep was originally protected by a moat, since filled in, with a drawbridge, of which only the slots now survive. The castle could have been protected at short-range with hand guns, although the gunloops for these were of an antiquated design for the period, and a moated earthwork, 89 by 47 feet (27 by 14.4 m), was subsequently built to the rear of the castle to provide additional protection.

The keep is two storeys high, built of ashlar Portland stone. Historic England considers it to form "one of the best preserved and best known examples" of the Henrician forts. In the centre of the ground floor is the octagonal great hall, now fitted with large Victorian windows, which would have originally providing living space for the garrison. Off the great hall are wings holding the gunners' quarters and the castle's kitchen, the latter equipped with a large, 16th-century fireplace. Running around the front of the keep is the gun room. This was originally a two-storey gun battery with embrasures for five guns on the ground floor and four more above on the first floor, with the southern end of the ground floor subdivided into four barrack rooms. The ground-floor embrasures were designed with vents to allow the smoke from the guns to escape. Both the wooden roof that formed the first-floor gun platform and the internal wooden partitions have been dismantled, however, and the chamber is now open to the air. It now houses a variety of 18th and 19th century cannons.

On the first floor is the upper hall and the captain's chamber, used in the 16th century as a living and working space by the castle's commander, and converted into a dining room and a bedroom in the 19th century. On the opposite side to the captain's private chamber are two other bedrooms, possibly originally for the use of the castle's lieutenant.

The current Governor's Garden was created in 2002 by the horticulturist Christopher Bradley-Hole, as part of a wider programme of work across English Heritage properties. The maritime-themed garden features circular designs, echoing those in the adjacent castle, and uses local Portland stone.

== List of governors ==
- Captain John Arthur
- Richard Channing
- 1625–: Richard Rawleigh
- 1628–: Edward Sydenham
- 1644–1646 Sir Walter Hastings (Royalist)
- 1646: Elias Bond
- 1649–1650: Colonel Edward Sexby (Parliamentarian)
- 1650–1653: Lt-Col. George Joyce
- 1655–1658: John Pitson
- 1658–?1660: George Pley
- 1660–1679: Humphrey Weld (MP for Christchurch, 1661)
- 1698–1702: Sir Thomas Travell (MP for Milborne Port, 1701–1715)
- William Taunton
- c. 1714: Charles Paulet, 2nd Duke of Bolton
  - 1714–: Captain Richard Percy (Lieutenant-Governor)
- 1728–1741: William Clapcott (High Sheriff of Dorset, 1734)
- 1741–: Sydenham Williams (High Sheriff of Dorset, 1740)
- 1761–1788: John Taver
- 1788–1791: Gabriel Steward (died 1792) (MP for Weymouth, 1778–1790)
- 1791–1807: Gabriel Tucker Steward (son of above) (MP for Weymouth, 1794–1804)
- 1805–1834 : John Penn(MP for Helston, 1802–1805) (last governor)

Following the death of John Penn the post of Governor of Portland Castle was abolished.

== See also ==
- Castles in Great Britain and Ireland
- List of castles in England

== Bibliography ==
- Biddle, Martin; Hiller, Jonathon; Scott, Ian; Streeten, Anthony (2001). Henry VIII's Coastal Artillery Fort at Camber Castle, Rye, East Sussex: An Archaeological Structural and Historical Investigation. Oxford, UK: Oxbow Books. ISBN 0-904220-23-0.
- Chapple, Nick (2014). "A History of the National Collection: Volume Six, 1945–1953". Research Report Series. London, UK: English Heritage. ISSN 2046-9799.
- Fry, Sebastion (2014). "A History of the National Collection: Volume Two, 1900–1913". Research Report Series. London, UK: English Heritage. ISSN 2046-9799.
- Hale, J. R. (1983). Renaissance War Studies. London, UK: Hambledon Press. ISBN 0-907628-17-6.
- Harrington, Peter (2007). The Castles of Henry VIII. Oxford, UK: Osprey Publishing. ISBN 978-1-4728-0380-1.
- King, D. J. Cathcart (1991). The Castle in England and Wales: An Interpretative History. London, UK: Routledge Press. ISBN 978-0-415-00350-6.
- Lawson, Susannah (2002). Portland Castle: Dorset. London, UK: English Heritage. ISBN 978-1-85074-725-3.
- Morley, B. M. (1976). Henry VIII and the Development of Coastal Defence. London, UK: Her Majesty's Stationery Office. ISBN 0-11-670777-1.
- Pettifer, Adrian (2002). English Castles: A Guide by Counties. Woodbridge, UK: Boydell Press. ISBN 978-0-85115-782-5.
- Saunders, Andrew (1989). Fortress Britain: Artillery Fortifications in the British Isles and Ireland. Liphook, UK: Beaufort. ISBN 1-85512-000-3.
- Symonds, Henry (1914). "Sandsfoot and Portland Castles". Proceedings of the Dorset Natural History and Archaeological Society. 35: 27–40.
- Thompson, M. W. (1987). The Decline of the Castle. Cambridge, UK: Cambridge University Press. ISBN 1-85422-608-8.
- Walton, Steven A. (2010). "State Building Through Building for the State: Foreign and Domestic Expertise in Tudor Fortification". Osiris. 25 (1): 66–84. doi:10.1086/657263. S2CID 144384757.
