= Lulworth Castle =

Coordinates: 50°38′15″N 2°12′38″W

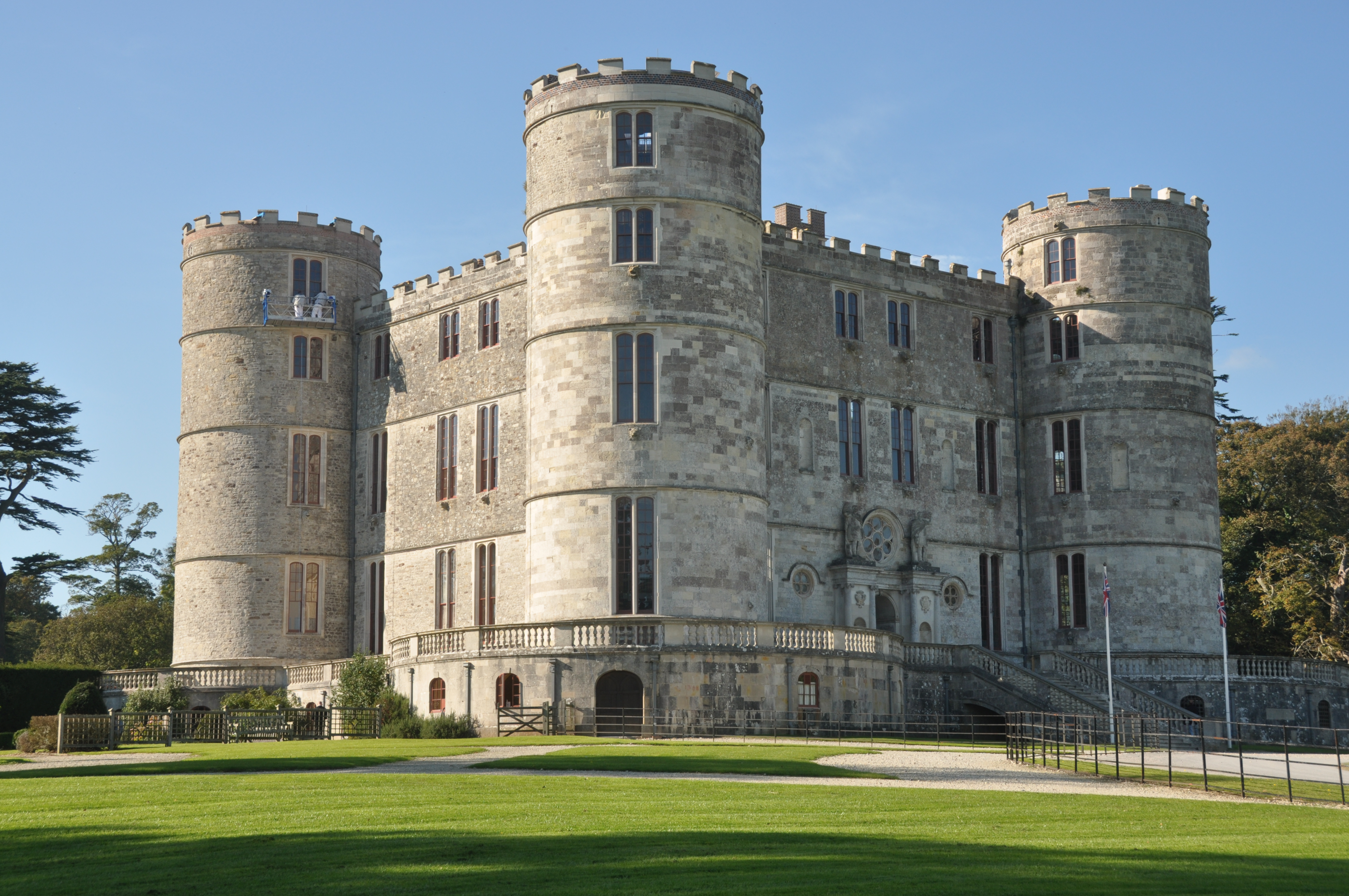
- Lulworth Castle after restoration

- Location within Dorset
- Type: House/castle
- Location: East Lulworth, Dorset, England

History
- Built: 1588–1609
- Built for: Thomas Howard, 3rd Viscount Howard of Bindon

Site notes
- Architect: attributed to Inigo Jones
- Architectural styles: Elizabethan-Jacobean, Adam style interior
- Governing body: Family owned

Listed Building – Grade I
- Official name: Lulworth Castle
- Designated: 30 November 1959
- Reference no.: 1323323

Scheduled monument
- Official name: Lulworth Castle
- Designated: 26 October 1954
- Reference no.: 1016069

Lulworth Castle, in East Lulworth, Dorset, England, situated south of the village of Wool, is an early 17th-century hunting lodge erected in the style of a revival fortified castle, one of only five extant Elizabethan or Jacobean buildings of this type. It is listed with Historic England as a scheduled monument. It is Grade I listed. The 18th-century Adam style interior of the stone building was damaged by fire in 1929, but has been restored and serves as a museum. The castle stands in Lulworth Park on the Lulworth Estate. The park and gardens surrounding the castle are Grade II listed with Historic England.

== History ==
The foundations for Lulworth Castle were laid in 1588 and it was completed in 1609, supposedly designed by Inigo Jones. It was built as a hunting lodge by Thomas Howard, 3rd Viscount Howard of Bindon, a grandson of the 3rd Duke of Norfolk. In 1607 Viscount Bindon wrote to Robert Cecil, 1st Earl of Salisbury, crediting him with the origins of the design:

"If this little pile in Lulworth Park shall prove pretty or worth the labour bestowed in the erecting of it, I will acknowledge, as the truth is, that your powerful speech to me at Bindon laid the first foundation of the pile in my mind, which ever since has laboured for a speedy finishing for the contentment of those for whose further liking of that place the care is taken".

According to the NHLE listing, the building was subsequently remodelled 1609-11 for Thomas, Lord Suffolk; remodelled again in 1641 for Humphrey Weld; in the early 18th century by the Bastard brothers of Blandford Forum for the then owner, Edward Weld; and in the 1780s by Catholic architect John Tasker for Thomas Weld. Tasker also built the Roman Catholic chapel in the grounds. Pevsner's assessment of the castle building two hundred years later views it as a Jacobean case of one-upmanship among wealthy landowners whose residential needs are already satisfied elsewhere, hence a series of " 'mock castles', such as the Elizabethan castellated house par excellence that is Longford Castle" which probably inspired Bindon.

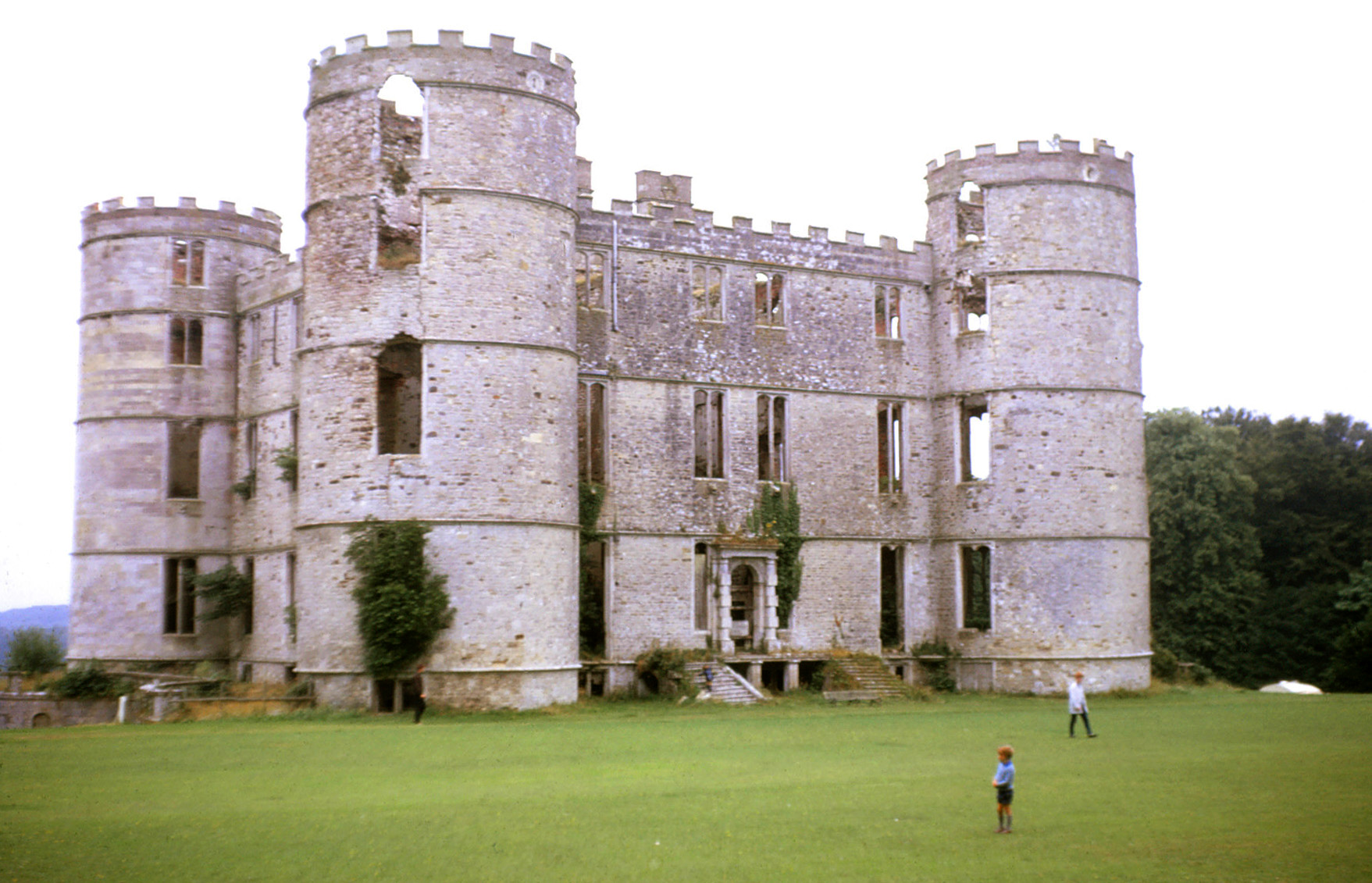
Lulworth Castle in August 1968, prior to renovation

In 1641, Humphrey Weld, a grandson of Sir Humphrey Weld (died 1610), purchased it from Howard's heir, Lord Howard de Walden. The castle was seized by the Roundheads during the English Civil War, who used it as a garrison. Weld regained the property after the war finished and held on to it despite growing debts. Having married off his only daughter to an earl, Humphrey chose his catholic nephew, William Weld as his successor. William struggled with near insolvency, but partially rescued the estate finances by ensuring his son, Humphrey III (died 1722), married well into the Simeons family. Margaret Simeons and her parents helped out with a dowry and managed the estate after she was widowed. Humphrey was succeeded by their son, Edward Weld (Senior) who had the means to decorate the interiors of the castle, build extensions and lay out the grounds, despite personal legal difficulties he managed to overcome.

Thomas Weld, Edward's youngest son, eventually inherited the property after his eldest brother, also Edward, died as a result of a riding accident in 1775. Twenty-five-year-old Thomas set about refurbishing the interiors in Adam style. He enriched the collection of books in the magnificent library, a few of which are extant. He also entertained George III at Lulworth. Thomas and his wife Mary produced fifteen children, most of whom survived, and together with their descendants were able to retain Lulworth as the family seat into the 21st century.

Following the French Revolution, surviving members of the French royal family were invited to use Lulworth as one of their residences-in-exile. Later Charles X of France and family also stayed there briefly, following the July Revolution of 1830 on their way to Edinburgh.

== St Mary's Chapel, Lulworth ==
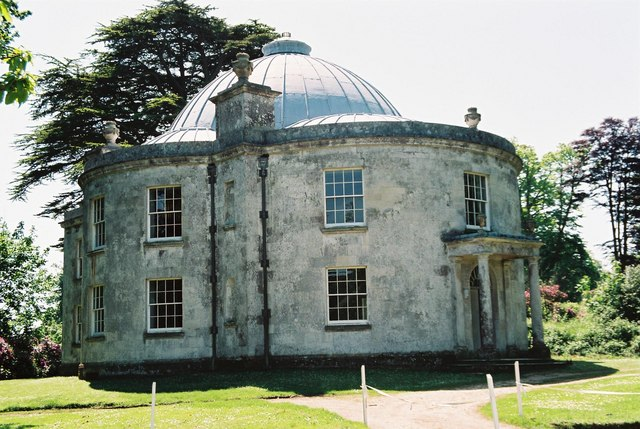
Grade I listed RC Chapel of St Mary, built to look like a house

Thomas Weld built a Roman Catholic church dedicated to St. Mary to serve as the family chapel in the grounds of the castle in 1786. Pevsner relates that he needed permission from King George III on condition that it did not look like a church from outside. It was to be the first Roman Catholic chapel to be built in England since the time of the Protestant Reformation. It was designed by John Tasker in the form of a Greek mausoleum at a cost of £2,380. The building has been Grade I listed.

On 15 August 1790 John Carroll, an American Jesuit friend of Thomas, was consecrated bishop by Bishop Charles Walmesley, in the chapel of Lulworth Castle. Carroll had been named the first Catholic bishop in the United States (as Bishop of Baltimore) in 1789, and he came to Walmseley for Episcopal Consecration. The next episcopal consecration took place there on 19 December of the same year when John Douglass was consecrated bishop of The London District (which included the home counties, the West Indies with the exception of Trinidad, and the Channel Islands of Jersey and Guernsey) by William Gibson, titular bishop of Acanthus, and Vicar Apostolic of the Northern District.

== Restoration ==
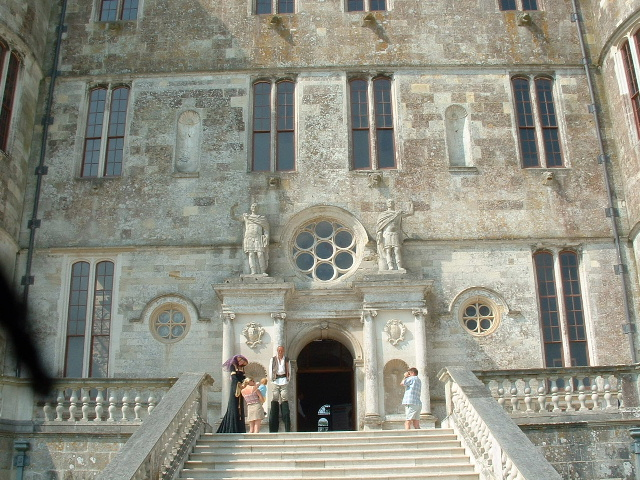
Entrance to the castle.

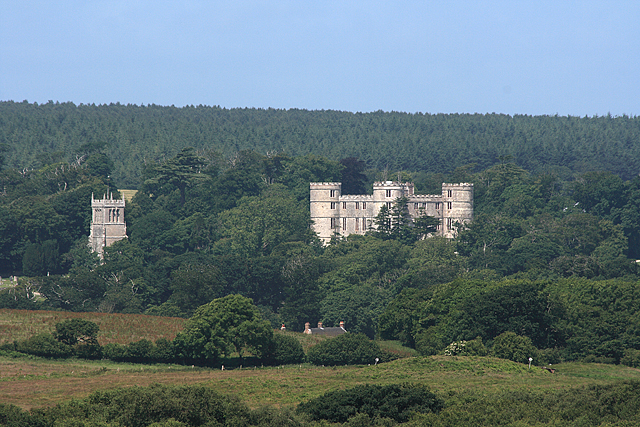
Lulworth Castle centre right, and the tower of St Andrew's C of E Church at left

The castle was gutted by fire on 29 August 1929 and was left as a roofless ruin, the family building a new residence for themselves nearby. In the 1970s, restoration work began with the help of English Heritage. The restoration, finished in 1998, included a new roof and restored surviving walls in the interior, but no new internal walls or replacements for the destroyed upper floors were constructed.

In 1986 the Baltimore-born organ builder William Drake restored the 1780 Seede organ at the Roman Catholic Chapel at Lulworth Castle, a project that attracted attention internationally.

The castle is still owned by the Weld family and is a tourist attraction, holding medieval-themed events. Part of the Lulworth Estate is in use as an MoD firing range as well as a wildlife conservation area.

Since 2017, the site has been used as the location for the Bestival music festival, with the castle's foreground being the location for the main "Castle" stage.

== See also ==
- 18th-century Western domes

== Bibliography ==
- C. M. Antony. "Lulworth Castle: Its History and Memories." The Catholic Historical Review, Vol. 1, No. 3 (Oct., 1915), pp. 243–257
- Berkeley, J. Lulworth and the Welds. Gillingham: Blackmore, 1971.
- Manco, Jean, Greenhalf, David and Girouard, Mark. "Lulworth Castle in the Seventeenth Century". Architectural History, Vol. 33, (1990), pp. 29–59.
- Manco, Jean and Kelly, Francis. "Lulworth Castle from 1700." Architectural History, Vol. 34, (1991), pp. 145–170
- The Weld family & Lulworth. Wareham: Lulworth Castle. 2004.
- Newth, John. "One of Dorset’s grandest and most interesting country houses - The history of Lulworth Castle is bound up with the stories of the Weld family and of one of the most important estates in South Dorset. John Newth has been to visit.". Dorset Life, April 2015. Wiew on line:

== Gallery ==
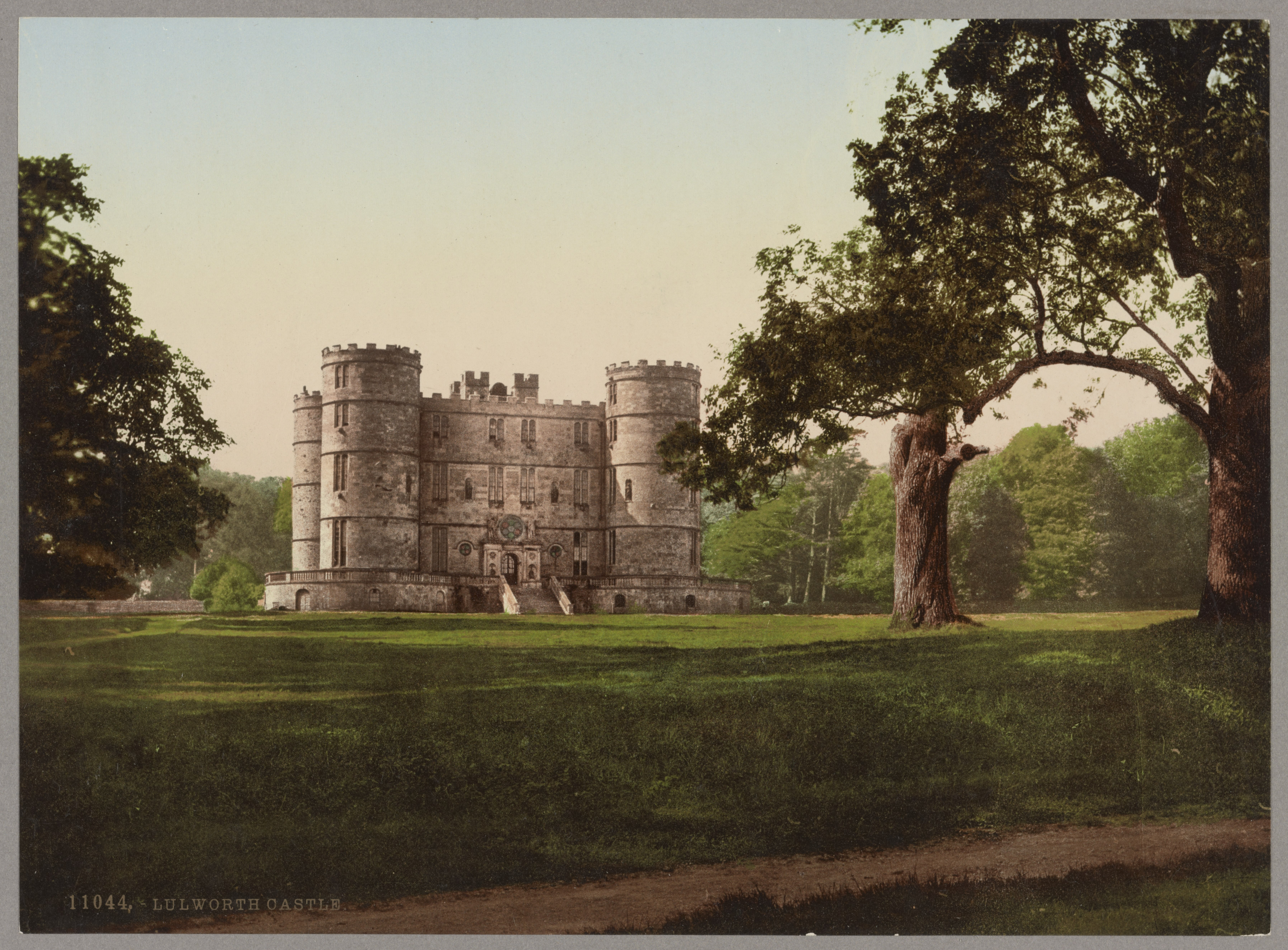
Lulworth Castle in the park

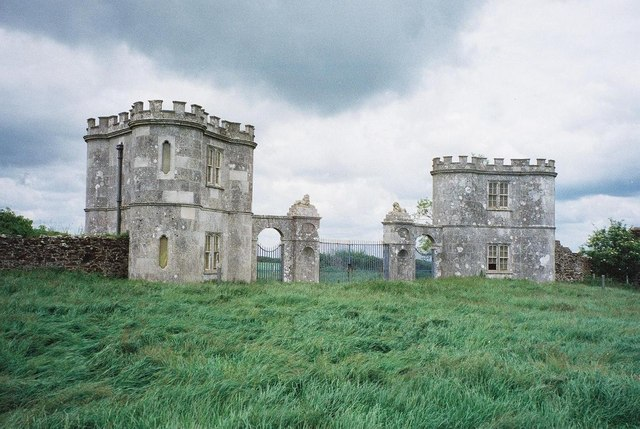
Lulworth Castle, Triangular Lodges

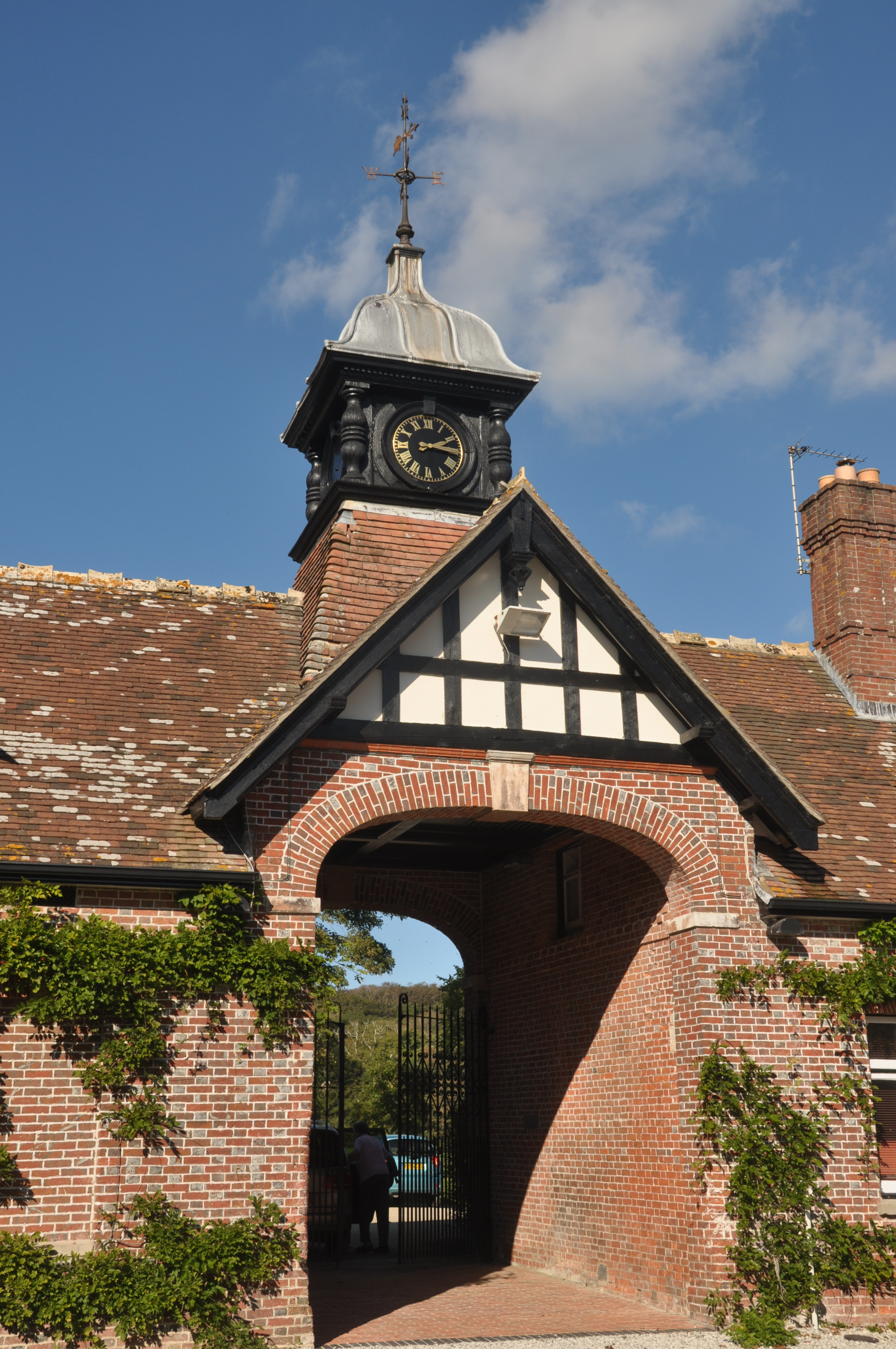
Lulworth Castle stables (1932)

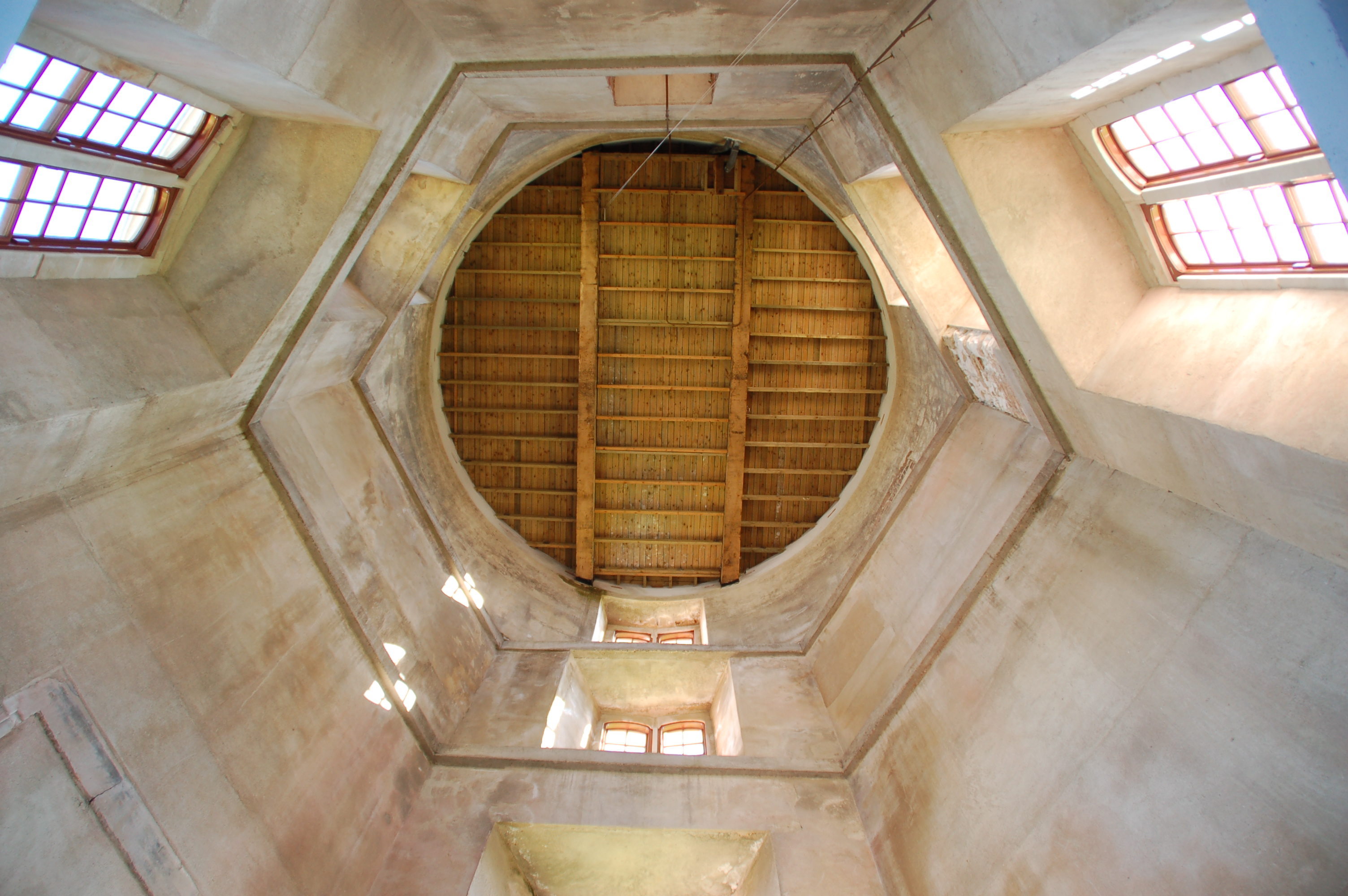
Roof from interior

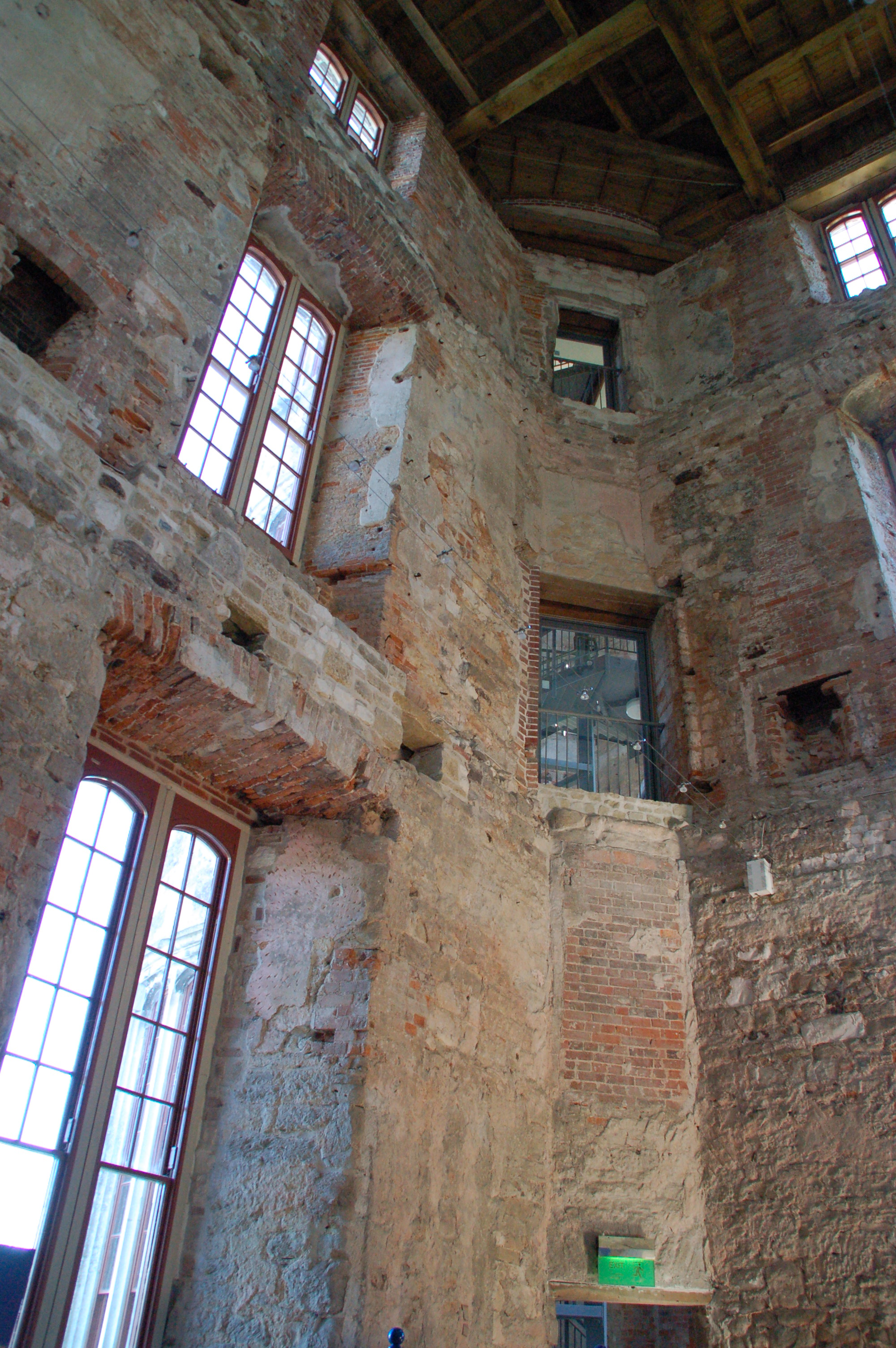
Castle Interior

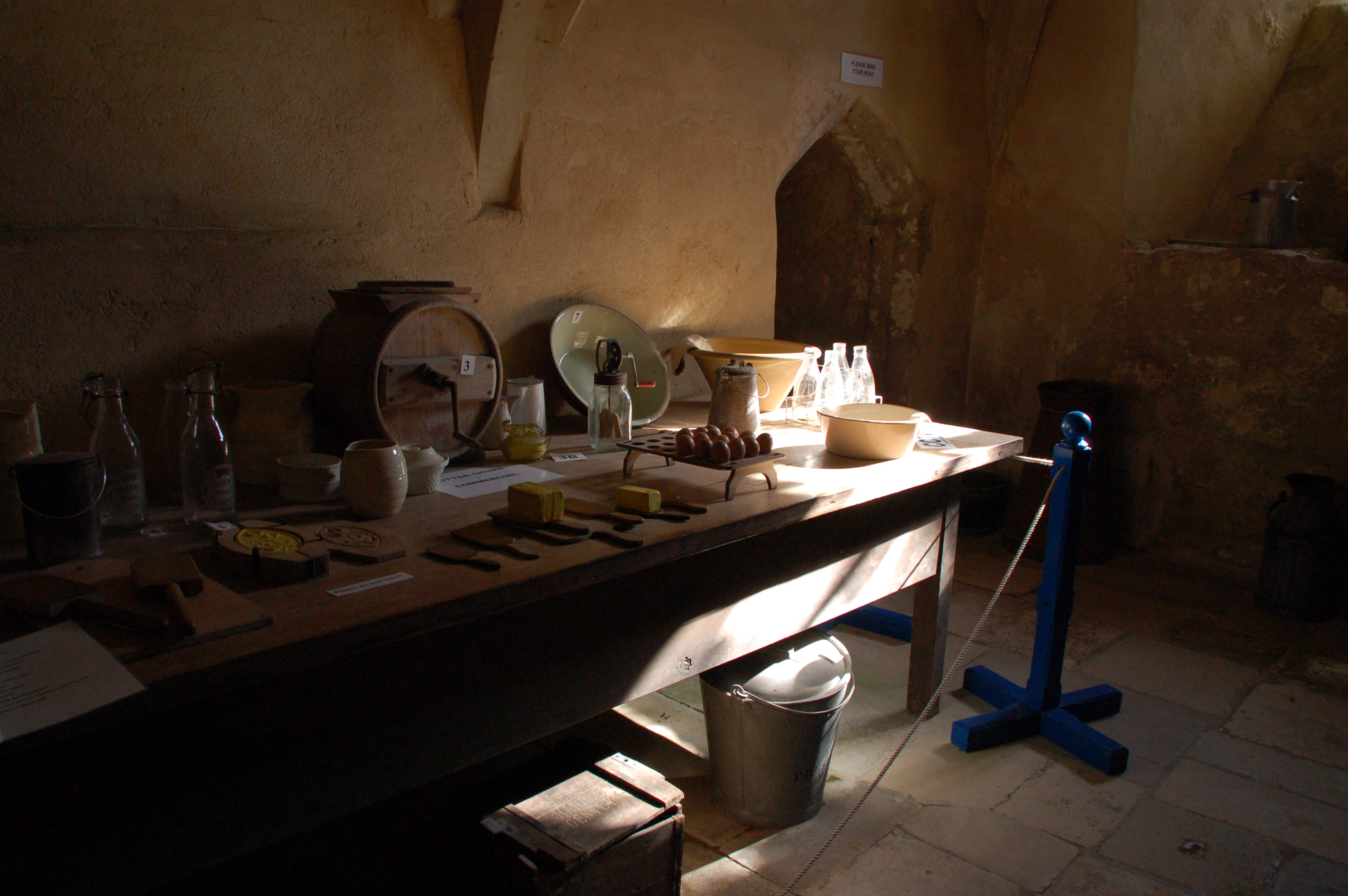
Castle kitchen

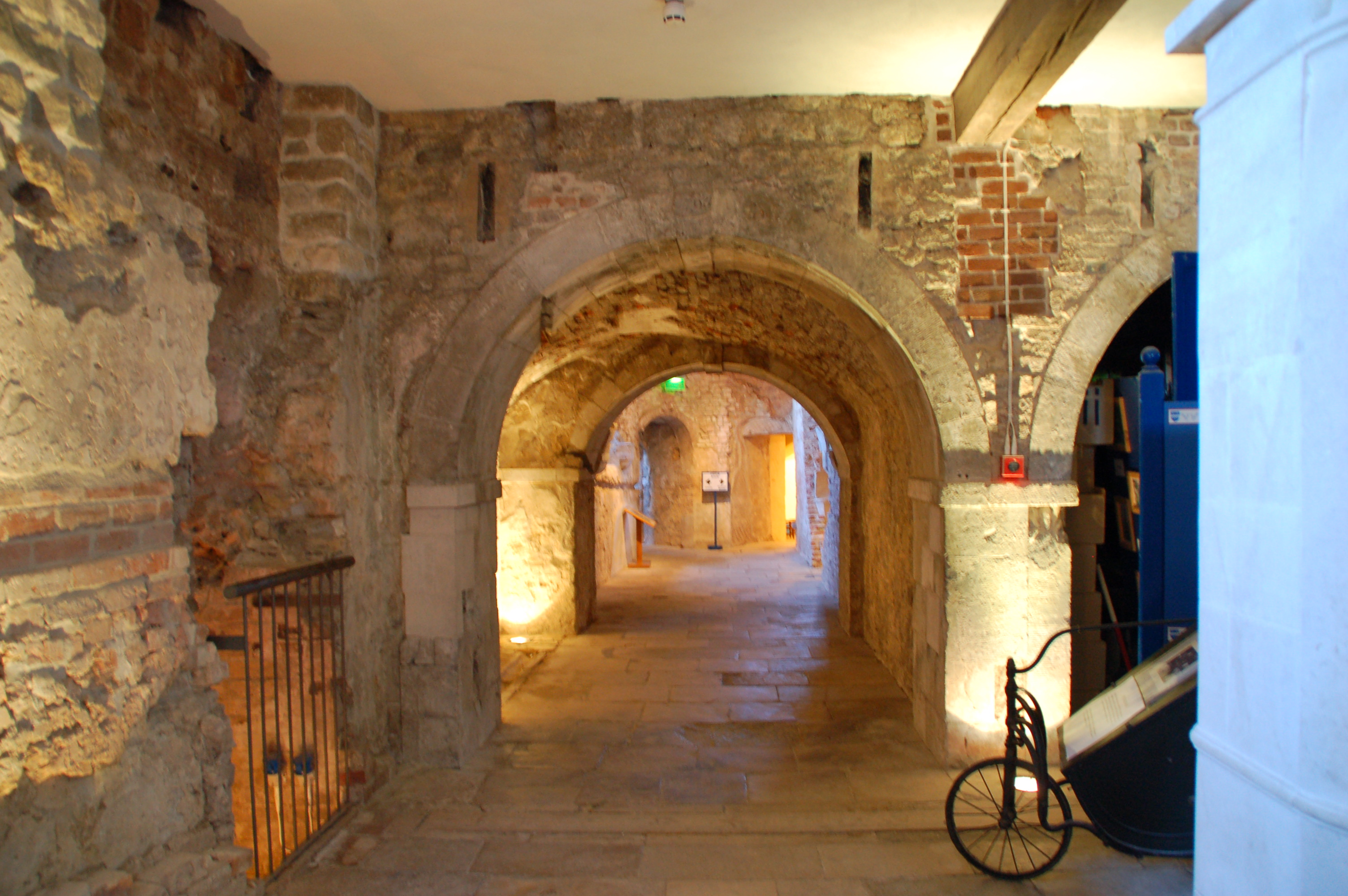
Castle vaulted cellar
