= Lulworth Estate =

Country estate in Dorset, United Kingdom

Coordinates: 50°38′15″N 2°12′38″W

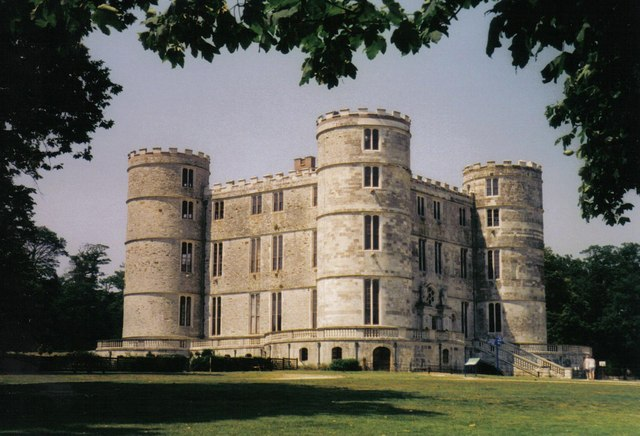
Lulworth Castle.

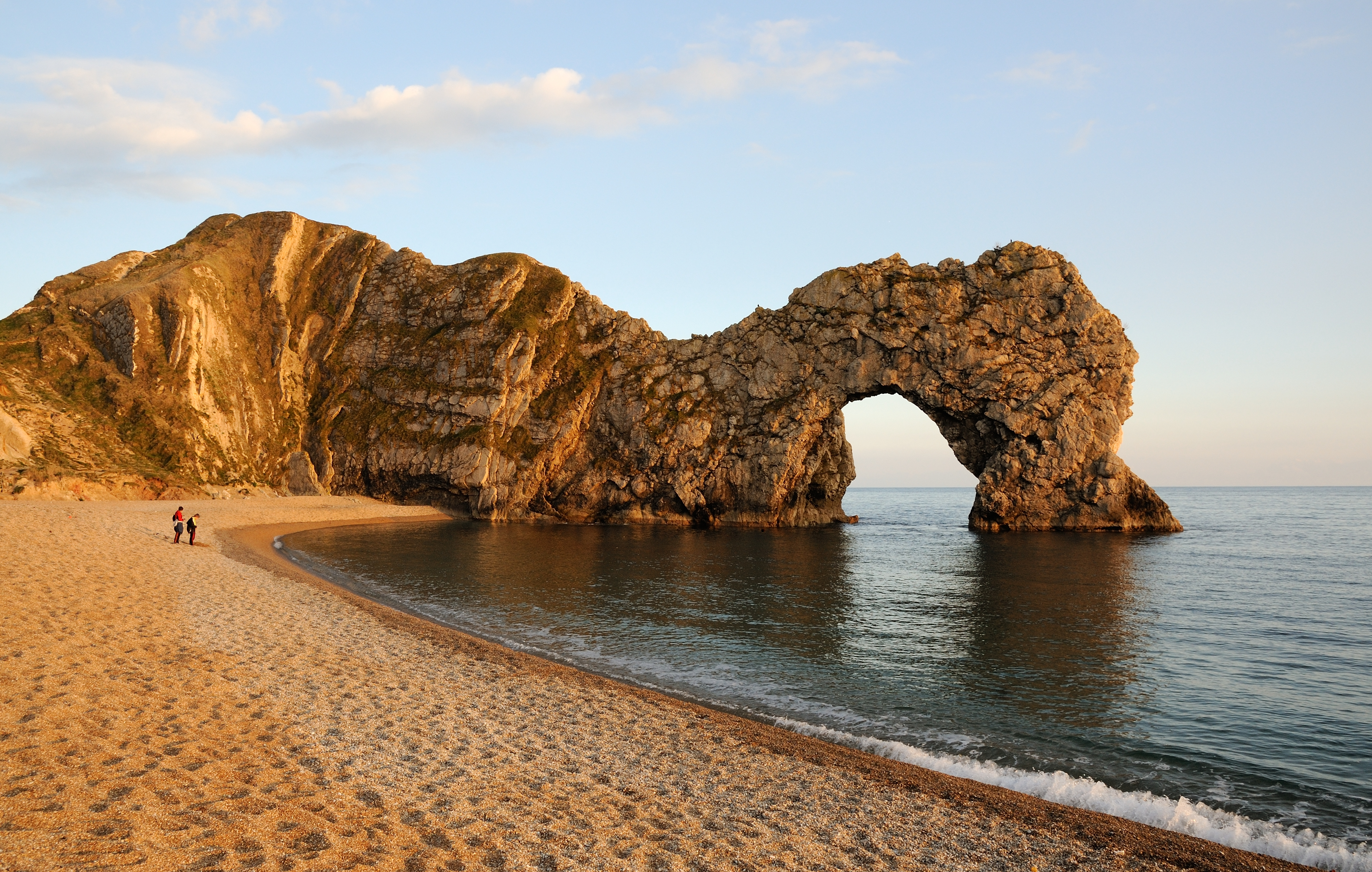
Durdle Door, part of the Lulworth Estate

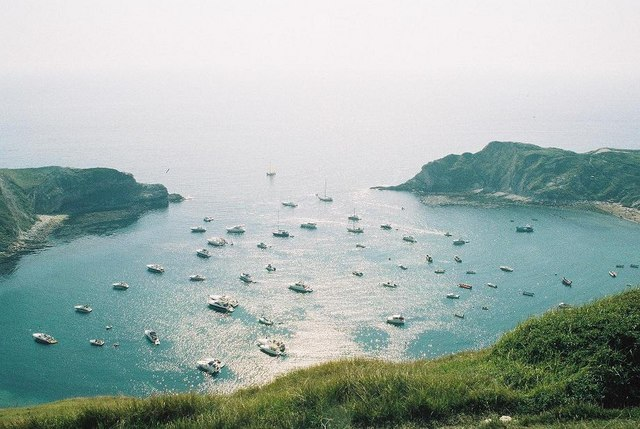
Lulworth Cove, part of the Lulworth Estate

The Lulworth Estate is a 12,000-acre (4,900 ha) country estate located in central south Dorset, England. Its most notable landscape feature is a five-mile stretch of coastline on the Jurassic Coast, a World Heritage Site, including Durdle Door and Lulworth Cove. It is owned by the Weld family.

The historic estate includes the Lulworth Castle and park. The landscaped gardens are Grade II listed in the National Register of Historic Parks and Gardens. The castle was residence to the Weld family until 1929 when it was ravaged by fire.

Lulworth was once part of a grander estate under Thomas Howard, 3rd Viscount Howard of Bindon.
