= Sir Humphrey Weld =

English merchant

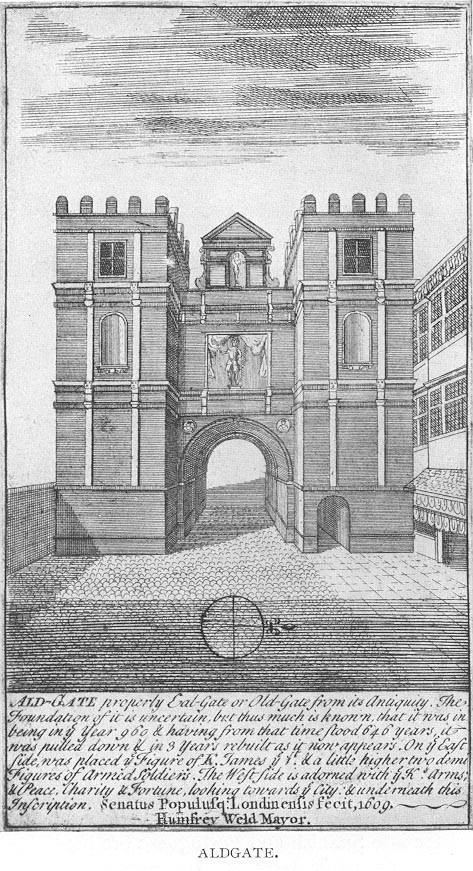
Aldgate as reconstructed in Weld's mayoralty

Sir Humphrey Weld (died 29 November 1610) was an English merchant who was Lord Mayor of London in 1608.

== Career ==
Weld's family roots were in Eaton and Congleton, Cheshire. He was the fourth son of John Weld of Eaton and his wife Joanna FitzHugh. He settled in Holdwell, Hertfordshire and became a City of London merchant and a member of the Worshipful Company of Grocers. On 9 May 1598, he was elected an alderman of the City of London for Farringdon Within ward. He was Sheriff of London from 1599 to 1600. In 1600 he was among the aldermen led by Mayor Sir Nicholas Mosley who unsuccessfully appealed to the Marquess of Winchester for funds for the repair of the steeple of the church of the Austin Friars. He was knighted on 26 July 1603. He transferred as alderman to Walbrook ward in 1604.

In 1608, he was elected Lord Mayor of London. During his mayoralty, the reconstruction of the Aldgate, one of the four principal gates of the City of London, was completed. Weld's name as Mayor appeared on the gate itself, and in connection with an engraving of the gate produced later. He was president of Christ's Hospital from 1609.

The Latin inscription on his tomb, together with long poetic epitaph, which were in the south aisle of St Olave, Old Jewry, are recorded in Anthony Munday's edition of John Stow's Survey of London. The heraldry for Sir Humphrey is shown as a quartering, 1 and 4: Weld, 2: Button als Grant, 3: Fitzhugh, with a cadency mark of a martlet (fourth son) at the central crossing of the quarters.

== Family ==
Sir Humphrey married first, Ann Wheler (daughter of Nicolas Wheler), the mother of his children; and secondly Mary, one of the three daughters of Sir Stephen Slaney, Lord Mayor for 1595 to 1596. His children (by Ann) are shown as follows in the Visitation of Middlesex:

- John Weld (1585–1622) of Arnolds in Southgate, Middlesex. A merchant, he founded the Weld Chapel in Edmonton, London. He married Frances daughter of William Whitmore of London (and sister of Sir William Whitmore), was knighted in 1617, died in 1622, and was buried in his private chapel at Arnolds. He was survived by his wife and children. His son was Humphrey Weld (of Lulworth), a Member of parliament, who acquired "Weld House" in London.
- Humphrey Weld, died without issue
- Joan Weld, eldest daughter. In 1597 she became the first wife of Sir Robert Brooke of Cockfield Hall, Yoxford, Suffolk. She died aged 38 and was buried at Yoxford church in May 1618.
- Anne Weld, married first, Richard Corbett of Stoke, Shropshire; after his death, her jointure was arranged in December 1617 in anticipation of her marriage to Sir James Stonehouse (died 1638).
- Mary Weld, died without issue
- Elizabeth Weld, died without issue
- Sarah Weld, died without issue

Civic offices
Preceded by Henry Rowe	Lord Mayor of the City of London; 1608	Succeeded by Thomas Cambell
