= Charles Clifford, 8th Baron Clifford of Chudleigh =

British peer

Charles Hugh Clifford, 8th Baron Clifford of Chudleigh JP DL (27 July 1819 – 5 August 1880) was a British peer.

== Early life ==
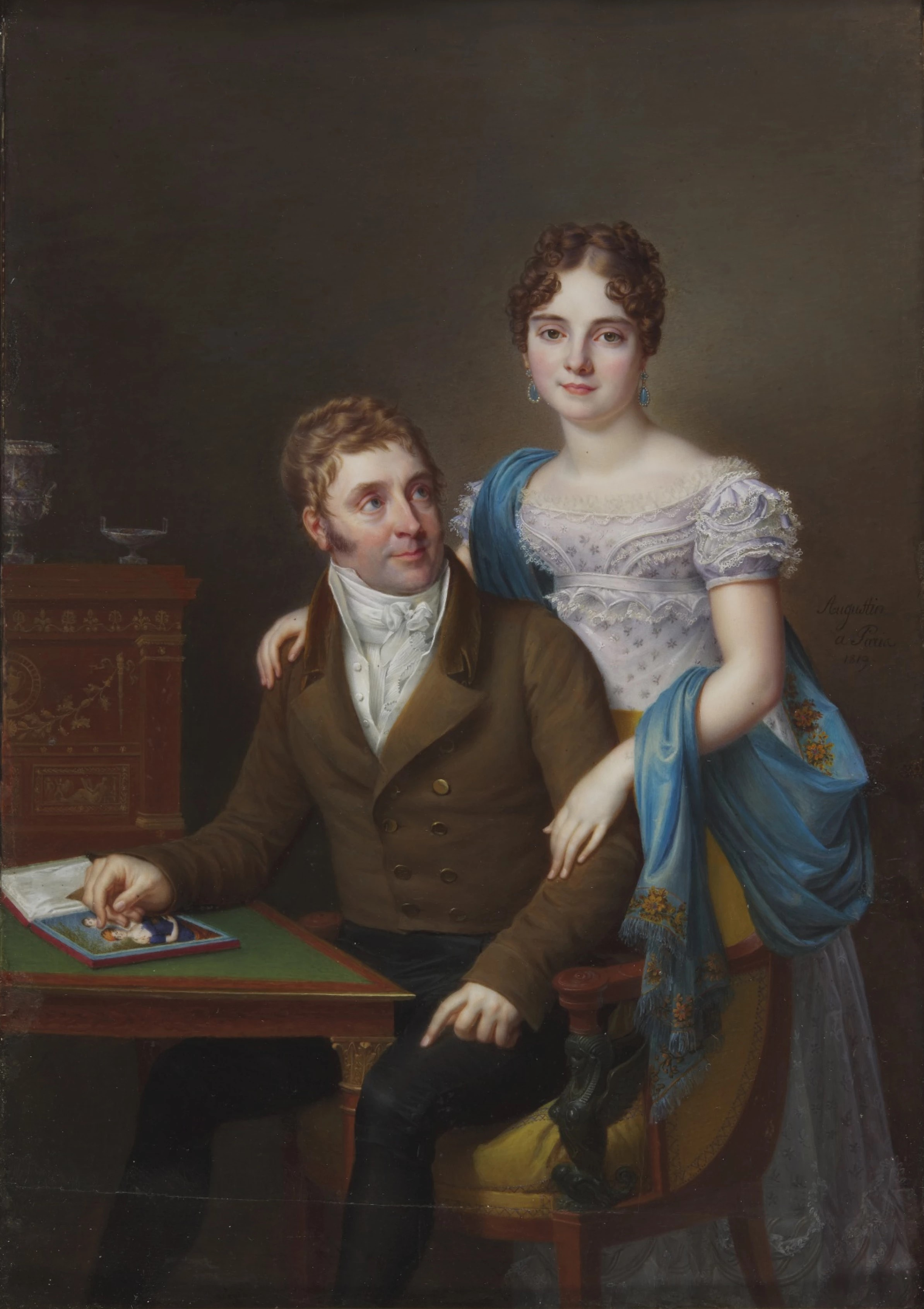
Portrait of his mother, Mary Lucy Weld, and his maternal grandfather, Thomas Weld, by Jean-Baptiste Jacques Augustin, 1819.

Clifford was born on 27 July 1819 in London. He was the son of Hugh Clifford, 7th Baron Clifford of Chudleigh and Mary Lucy Weld. Among his siblings were Hon. Eleonora Mary Clifford (who became a Roman Catholic nun of Sacré Coeur), the Rt. Rev. William Hugh Joseph Clifford (the 2nd Bishop of Clifton), Hon. Mary Constantia Clifford (who married a son of Sir Edward Vavasour, 1st Baronet), Hon. Sir Henry Hugh Clifford (who married a daughter of Joseph Anstice), and Hon. Walter Clifford (who became a Roman Catholic priest).

His paternal grandparents were Charles Clifford, 6th Baron Clifford of Chudleigh, and the Hon. Eleanor Mary Arundell (a daughter of the 8th Baron Arundell). His maternal grandparents were Cardinal Thomas Weld of Lulworth Castle, and the former Lucy (née Clifford). Together, they were the parents of six sons and two daughters: Through his brother Henry, he was an uncle of Sir Hugh Charles Clifford, and Brig.-Gen. Henry Frederick Hugh Clifford.

== Career ==
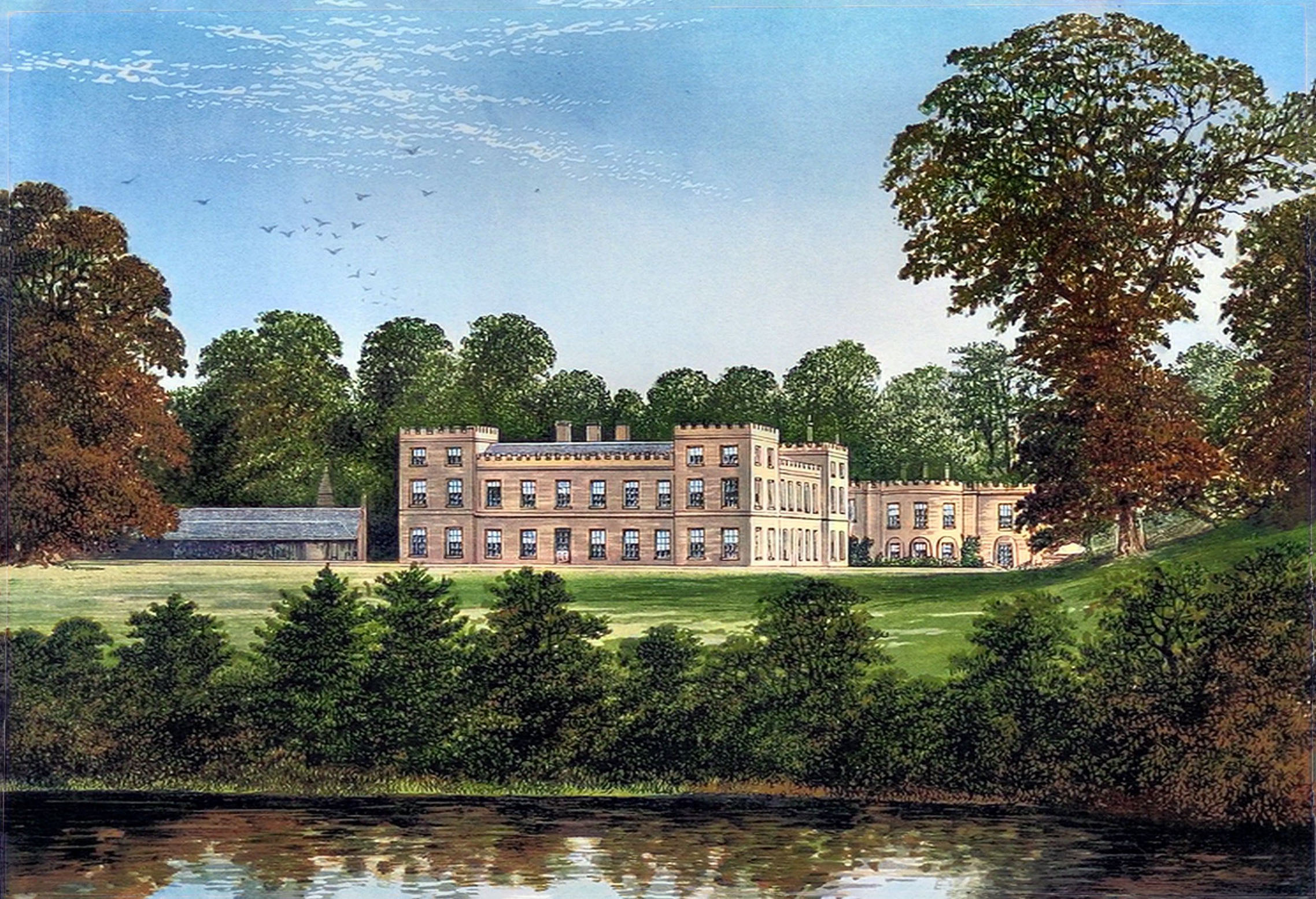
The Clifford family seat, Ugbrooke Park in Devon, from Morris's County Seats (1869)

Upon the death of his father on 28 February 1858, Clifford succeeded as the 8th Baron Clifford of Chudleigh (and became a hereditary Count of the Holy Roman Empire) and inherited the family seat, Ugbrooke Park in Chudleigh, Devon, an estate of about 8,000 acres (3,200 ha). The house had been remodelled by Robert Adam, while the grounds were redesigned by Capability Brown in 1761. The grounds featured what were possibly the earliest plantings of the European White Elm, Ulmus laevis, in the UK.

Lord Clifford was a Justice of the Peace for Devonshire and Somerset as well as a Deputy Lieutenant of Devonshire.

== Personal life ==
On 30 September 1845, Clifford was married to Hon. Agnes Catherine Louisa Petre (1826–1891) at Thorndon Hall, the Petre family estate in Essex. Agnes was a daughter of William Petre, 11th Baron Petre and Emma Agnes Howard. Together, they were the parents of:

- Hon. Bertha Mary Agnes Clifford (b. 1848), who married Brodie Manuel de Zulueta, 3rd Count of Torre Díaz, son of Pedro José de Zulueta, 2nd Count of Torre Díaz, in 1892.
- Hon. Mary Lucy Constance Clifford (b. 1849), who became a nun.
- Lewis Henry Hugh Clifford, 9th Baron Clifford of Chudleigh (1851–1916), who served as aide-de-camp to King Edward VII in 1901; he married Mabel Anne Towneley, daughter of Lt.-Col. John Towneley, MP for Beverley, in 1890.
- Bede William Hugh Clifford (1852–1853), who died in infancy.
- Edith Teresa Mary Clifford (b. 1855), who became a nun.
- Hon. Edmund Charles Hugh Clifford (1857–1867), who died young.
- William Hugh Clifford, 10th Baron Clifford of Chudleigh (1858–1943), who married Catherine Mary Bassett, daughter of R. Bassett, in 1886. After her death, he married May Knox, a daughter of Sir Adrian Knox, Chief Justice of the High Court of Australia. After her death, he married his former housekeeper, Grace Muriel St. Clair-Munro, a daughter of W. St. Clair-Munro, in 1943.
- Hon. Cecilia Mary Clifford (1860–1919), who married Rudolph Feilding, 9th Earl of Denbigh, son of Rudolph Feilding, 8th Earl of Denbigh, in 1884. They were the parents of Rudolph Feilding, Viscount Feilding and Lady Dorothie Feilding.
- Hon. Walter Charles Ignatius Clifford (1862–1956), who died unmarried.
- Hon. Emma Mary Agnes Clifford (b. 1862), who married Francis Egerton Harding, son of Egerton William Harding, in 1889.

Lord Clifford died on 5 August 1880 at Ugbrooke Park. After a funeral service conducted by the Roman Catholic Bishops of Plymouth and Clifton (his younger brother William), he was buried in the family vault of the private chapel at Ugbrooke. Upon his death, he was succeeded in the barony by his eldest son, Lewis. When Lewis died in 1916, he was succeeded by another of the 8th Baron's sons, William, who was in turn the father of the 12th baron, Lewis. His widow died in 1891 at 69 Onslow Gardens in the Royal Borough of Kensington.

Peerage of England
Preceded by Hugh Charles Clifford	Baron Clifford of Chudleigh; 1858–1880	Succeeded by Lewis Henry Hugh Clifford
