= Hugh Clifford =

Hugh Clifford may refer to:

- Hugh Clifford (colonial administrator) (1866–1941), British colonial administrator
- Hugh Clifford, 2nd Baron Clifford of Chudleigh (1663–1730), English aristocrat
- Hugh Clifford, 3rd Baron Clifford of Chudleigh (1700–1732), peer
- Hugh Clifford, 7th Baron Clifford of Chudleigh (1790–1858), British peer
- Hughie Clifford (1873–1929), Scottish footballer
