= Albert Communal Cemetery Extension (War Graves) =

War cemetery located in the French Commune of Albert in the Somme Region

Albert Communal Cemetery Extension War Graves
- Commonwealth War Graves Commission
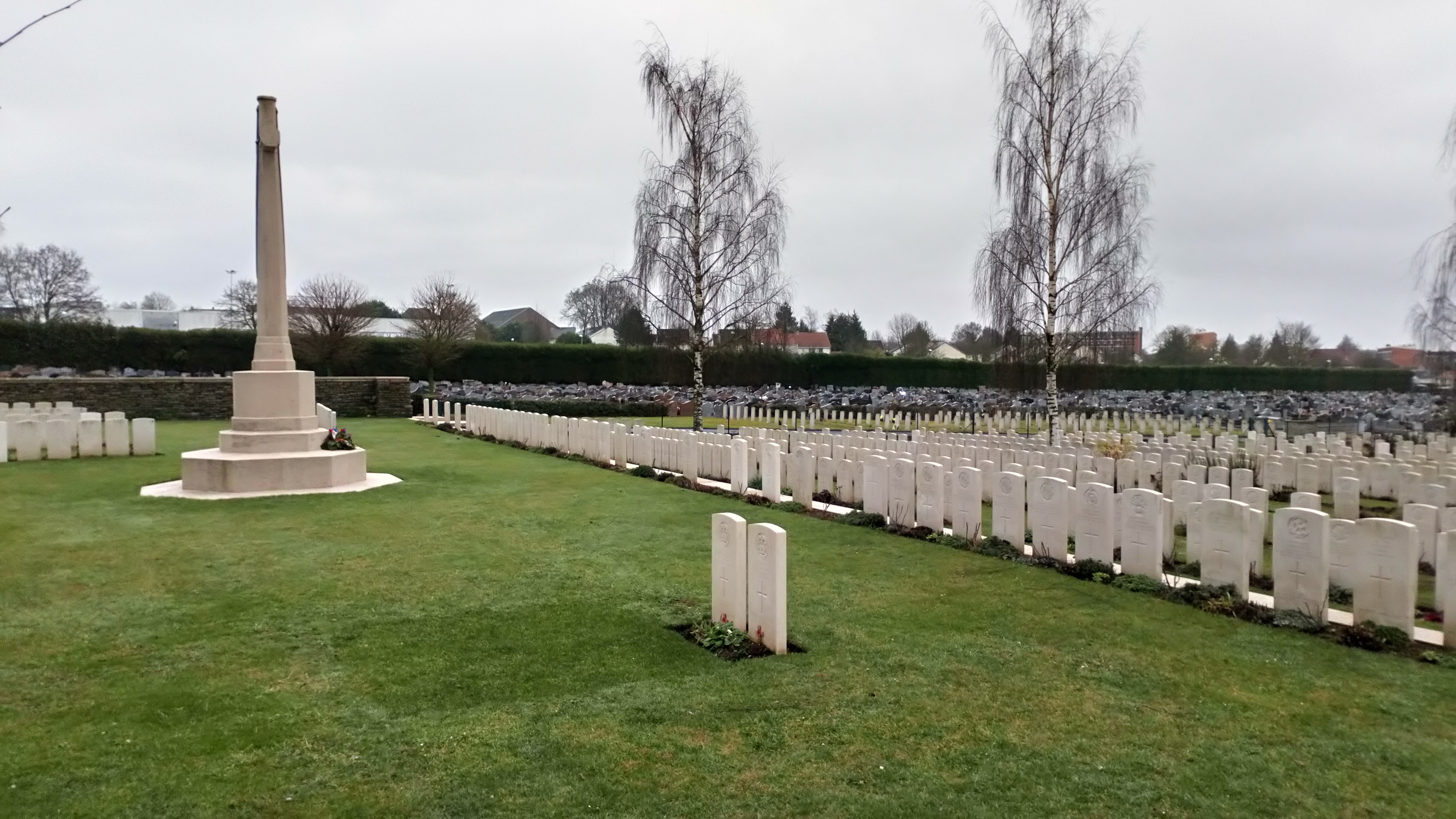
- Used for those deceased World War I August 1915 - January 1917; Battle of Albert (1916); March - August 1918; Battle of Albert (1918); World War II
- Location: Albert
- Designed by: Sir Edwin Lutyens
- Total burials: 888
- Unknowns: 20

Burials by nation
- United Kingdom: 625 Canada: 202; Australia: 38 India: 3

Burials by war
- World War I: 863; World War II: 25

The Albert Communal Cemetery Extension is a war cemetery with dead from both World War I and World War II located in the French Commune of Albert in the Somme Region.

== Location ==
The commune of Albert is 28 km northeast of Amiens, in the Somme in Northern France. The Cemetery is located on the south-east of Albert on the junctions of the roads to Peronne (D938) and Bray-sur-Somme (D329).

== Background ==
=== World War I ===
The extension was first used by the British in August 1915 when the British first held the Albert. Before that, the French held Albert and had done so even through the German advance on the Somme and the. subsequent Battle of Albert in September 1914. The Extension was used by fighting units and Field Ambulances from August 1915 to November 1916, and more particularly in and after mid to late 1916, when Field Ambulances were concentrated at Albert due to the Battle of Albert 1916 and the wider Somme Campaign. From November 1916, the 5th Casualty Clearing Station used it for two months. From March 1917 to February 1918, it was not used, until 4 burials in March 1918. Plot II was created in August 1918 by the 18th Division.

It was captured by the Germans on 26 April 1918 and before its recapture by the 8th Battalion East Surrey Regiment on the following 22 August during the Battle of Albert 1918 it had been completely destroyed by artillery fire.

=== World War II ===
During the Second World War it was used again after the French moved British graves into the cemetery from isolated areas around Albert.

== The Cemetery ==
The War graves are located in an extension to the original local cemetery of Albert. The majority of graves are arranged face towards the road with Cross of Sacrifice at the head in the centre. A few more additional roads line the side of the Cross with the rest of the graves being located next to the main plot separated by a wide path. The War graves are separated from the rest of the communal cemetery by low walls, hedges and fences.

== Burials ==
There are a total of 888 burials with 868 being identifiable, the rest are unknown soldiers and are thus marked as such. 12 of these unidentifiable burials are from the First World War and 8 are from the Second World War. Five graves were destroyed by shell fire and as such are now represented by memorials to them. Two soldiers known to be among the casualties buried here, but whose graves could not be identified, are commemorated by memorials, inscribed, "Known to be buried in this cemetery"

=== Burials by unit ===
1st Battalion, Canadian Mounted Rifles: 6

2nd Battalion, Canadian Mounted Rifles: 2

4th Battalion, Canadian Mounted Rifles: 3

5th Battalion, Canadian Mounted Rifles: 2

29th Lancers, Deccan Horse): 1

2nd Battalion Canadian Mounted Rifles: 2

Queen Victoria's Own Sappers and Miners: 1

43rd Erinpura Regiment: 1

Argyll and Sutherland Highlanders: 1

Army Ordnance Corps: 2

Army Service Corps: 20

Army Veterinary Corps: 1

Australian Army Medical Corps: 2

Royal Australian Engineers: 4

Royal Australian Artillery: 1

Australian Infantry, Australian Imperial Force: 27

Australian Light Trench Mortar Battery: 1

Australian Pioneers: 3

Bedfordshire and Hertfordshire Regiment: 17

Black Watch: 10

British West Indies Regiment: 2

Cambridgeshire Regiment: 1

Queen's Own Cameron Highlanders: 4

Cameronians (Scottish Rifles): 2

Canadian Army Medical Corps: 13

Canadian Army Service Corps: 1

Canadian Engineers: 11

Canadian Field Artillery: 19

Canadian Infantry Corps:118

Canadian Machine Gun Corps: 7

Canadian Pioneers: 8

Canadian Corps of Signals: 1

Dorsetshire Regiment: 1

Duke of Cornwall's Light Infantry: 1

Duke of Wellington's (West Riding Regiment): 1

Durham Light Infantry: 7

East Lancashire Regiment: 5

East Yorkshire Regiment: 1

Essex Regiment: 40

General List: 1

General Staff: 2

Gloucestershire Regiment: 8

Gordon Highlanders: 5

Grenadier Guards: 1

Highland Light Infantry: 1

King's Own (Royal Lancaster Regiment): 4

King's Own Yorkshire Light Infantry: 6

King's Royal Rifle Corps: 6

King's Shropshire Light Infantry: 2

Lancashire Fusiliers: 9

Leicestershire Regiment: 2

Leinster Regiment: 1

Lincolnshire Regiment: 11

London Regiment (1908–1938): 1

Machine Gun Corps: 5

Manchester Regiment: 5

Middlesex Regiment: 2

Norfolk Regiment: 12

North Staffordshire Regiment: 10

Northamptonshire Regiment: 13

Northumberland Fusiliers: 66

Northumberland Hussars: 1

Princess Patricia's Canadian Light Infantry: 4

Queen's Own Royal West Kent Regiment: 20

Royal Army Medical Corps: 13

Royal Berkshire Regiment: 14

Royal Canadian Regiment: 5

Royal Engineers: 38

Royal Field Artillery: 50

Royal Fusiliers: 18

Royal Garrison Artillery: 40

Royal Horse Artillery: 1

Royal Horse Guards: 2

Royal Irish Rifles: 3

Royal Munster Fusiliers: 3

Royal Scots: 16

Royal Sussex Regiment: 6

Royal Warwickshire Regiment: 9

Seaforth Highlanders: 1

Sherwood Foresters: 8

South Lancashire Regiment: 5

South Staffordshire Regiment: 3

South Wales Borderers: 10

Suffolk Regiment: 21

Buffs (Royal East Kent Regiment): 17

Loyal Regiment (North Lancashire): 2

Queen's Royal Regiment (West Surrey): 5

Welch Regiment: 8

West Yorkshire Regiment (Prince of Wales's Own): 3

Wiltshire Regiment: 1

Worcestershire Regiment: 4

York and Lancaster Regiment: 9

Yorkshire Regiment (Alexandra, Princess of Wales's Own): 4

=== Notable burials ===
Two deserters by the names of Pioneer Ernest Beeby ( 212th Company, Royal Engineers) and Private Henry Palmer (1st/5th Battalions Royal Northumberland Fusiliers) were executed at dawn by firing squads. Beeby on 9 December 1916 and Palmer on the 27 October 1916.

==== The Most Distinguished Order of Saint Michael and Saint George ====
The Order of Saint Michael and Saint George is a British Order of Chivalry that was awarded to those who "hold high and confidential offices within Her Majesty's colonial possessions, and in reward for services rendered to the Crown in relation to the foreign affairs of the Empire"

- Lieutenant Colonel James Atkinson Longridge CMG (43rd Erinpura Regiment)

==== Distinguished Service Order recipients ====
Prior to 1993 the Distinguished Service Order (DSO) was a military decoration of the United Kingdom, and formerly of other parts of the Commonwealth, awarded for meritorious or distinguished service by commissioned officers of the armed forces during wartime, typically in actual combat. It was established on 6 September 1886 and since 1993 all ranks have been eligible.

- Brigadier General Randall Barnett-Baker DSO (Royal Welsh Fusiliers, seconded to the General Staff.)
- Brigadier General Henry Frederick Hugh Clifford (Suffolk Regiment seconded to the General Staff.) - also awarded a Mention in Despatches.
- Lieutenant Colonel Victor Carl Buchanan DSO (13th Battalion Canadian Infantry) - also twice awarded a Mention in Despatches.

==== Military Cross recipients ====
Prior to 1993 the Military Cross (MC) military decoration was awarded to commissioned officers of the substantive rank of captain or below and for warrant officers for 'an act or acts of exemplary gallantry during active operations against the enemy on land'. It was established on 28 December 1914 and in 1993 it was opened up to all ranks.

- Major Thomas Charles Richardson MC (185th Company Royal Engineers)
- Captain Harold Price MC (26th Tyneside Irish Battalion Royal Northumberland Fusiliers)
- Captain Edward Inkerman Jordan Bell (17th (Service) Battalion, Middlesex Regiment (1st Football))
- Lieutenant Maurice Chritie-Murray MC (112th Brigade Royal Field Artillery)
- Lieutenant John Angus MacDonald MC (47th Battalion Canadian Infantry)
- Second Lieutenant Percy Augustine Binley MC (10th Battalion Essex Regiment.)

==== Distinguished Conduct Medal ====
The Distinguished Conduct Medal (DCM) was a military decoration for gallantry in the field by other ranks of the British Army. It was established in 1854 and discontinued in 1993.

- Lieutenant Harvey DCM MM (3rd Battalion Canadian Infantry) - also awarded a Military Medal.
- Acting Bombardier Roach DCM (107th Battery, Royal Field Artillery)
- Lance Corporal Peacock DCM (2nd Battalion Bedfordshire Regiment)
- Private George DCM (1st Battalion Black Watch.)
- Gunner Joseph Lambert DCM MM (83rd Battery Royal Field Artillery) - Also awarded the Military Medal

==== Military Medal recipients ====
The Military Medal (MM) was a military decoration awarded to personnel of the British Army and other arms of the armed forces, and to personnel of other Commonwealth countries, below commissioned rank, for "acts of gallantry and devotion to duty under fire" on land. It was first established in 1916, with retrospective application to 1914, and discontinued in 1993.

- Lieutenant John Percival Pringle MM (2nd Battalion Canadian Infantry)
- Second Lieutenant Herbert Josiah Hine MM (6th Battalion The Buffs, Royal East Kent Regiment)
- Serjeant Rainbow MM (55th Field Ambulance Royal Army Medical Corps)
- Lance Sergeant Edward Barnes MM (31st Battalion Canadian Infantry.)
- Bombardier Percival Vine MM ( 1st Trench Mortar Battery, Royal Garrison Artillery)
- Lance Corporal Marenza Bristow MM (2nd Battalion Bedfordshire Regiment.)
- Gunner Joseph Dyson MM ("Y" 1st Trench Mortar Battery.)
- Gunner Hill MM (13th Siege Battery Royal Garrison Artillery)
- Private Charles Albert Snook MM (7th Battalion The Buffs, Royal East Kent Regiment)
