= Baron Clifford of Chudleigh =

Title in the English peerage

- Arms of Clifford of Chudleigh: Chequy or and azure, a fesse gules These are the arms borne by Robert de Clifford, 1st Baron de Clifford (c. 1274–1314), feudal baron of Skipton, as recorded in the famous Caerlaverock Roll of 1300
- Creation date: 1672
- Created by: Charles II of England
- Peerage: Peerage of England
- First holder: Thomas Clifford, 1st Baron Clifford of Chudleigh
- Present holder: Thomas Hugh Clifford, 14th Baron Clifford of Chudleigh
- Heir apparent: Hon. Alexander Thomas Hugh Clifford
- Seat: Ugbrooke Park

Baron Clifford of Chudleigh, of Chudleigh in the County of Devon, is a title in the Peerage of England. It was created in 1672 for Thomas Clifford. The title was created as "Clifford of Chudleigh" rather than simply "Clifford" to differentiate it from several other Clifford Baronies previously created for members of this ancient family, including the Barony of de Clifford (1299), which is extant but now held by a branch line of the Russell family, having inherited through several female lines.

Baron Clifford of Chudleigh is the major surviving male representative of the Norman family which later took the name de Clifford and filled the feudal barons of Clifford, first seated in England at Clifford Castle in Herefordshire, created Baron de Clifford by writ in 1299. The family seat is Ugbrooke Park, near Chudleigh, Devon.

Notable members of this branch of the Clifford family include antiquarian Arthur Clifford (grandson of the 3rd Baron), Victoria Cross recipient Sir Henry Hugh Clifford (son of the 7th Baron), Catholic clergyman William Clifford (son of the 7th Baron) and colonial administrators Sir Bede Clifford (son of the 10th Baron) and Sir Hugh Clifford (grandson of the 7th Baron). The family is also related to the notable recusant Weld family, of Lulworth Castle, through the 7th Baron's marriage to the daughter of Cardinal Thomas Weld.

== Barons Clifford of Chudleigh (1672) ==
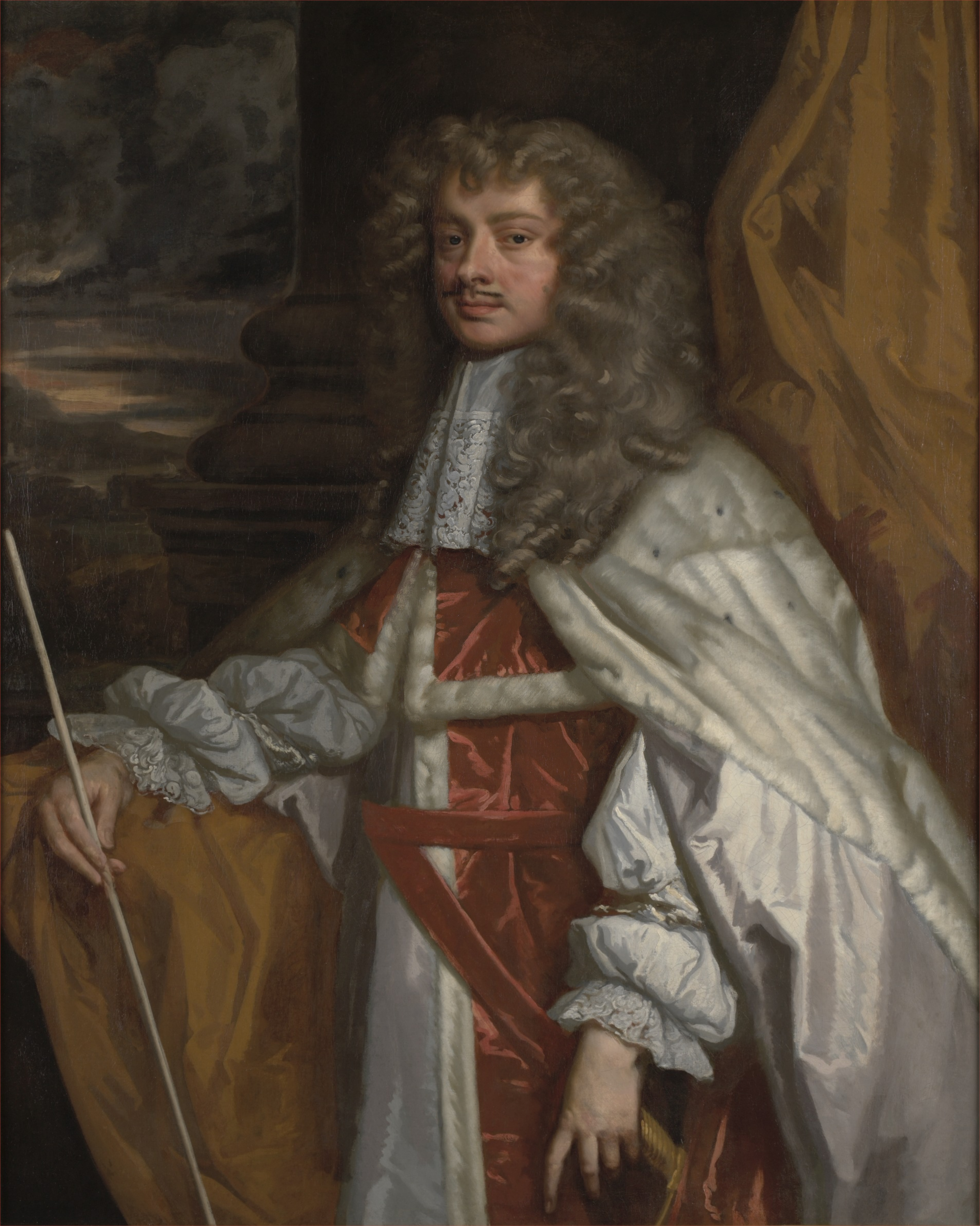
Thomas Clifford, 1st Baron Clifford of Chudleigh

- Thomas Clifford, 1st Baron Clifford of Chudleigh (1630–1673)
- Hugh Clifford, 2nd Baron Clifford of Chudleigh (1663–1730)
- Hugh Clifford, 3rd Baron Clifford of Chudleigh (1700–1732)
- Hugh Clifford, 4th Baron Clifford of Chudleigh (1726–1783)
- Hugh Edward Henry Clifford, 5th Baron Clifford of Chudleigh (1756–1793)
- Charles Clifford, 6th Baron Clifford of Chudleigh (1759–1831)
- Hugh Charles Clifford, 7th Baron Clifford of Chudleigh (1790–1858)
- Charles Hugh Clifford, 8th Baron Clifford of Chudleigh (1819–1880)
- Lewis Henry Hugh Clifford, 9th Baron Clifford of Chudleigh (1851–1916)
- William Hugh Clifford, 10th Baron Clifford of Chudleigh (1858–1943)
- Charles Oswald Hugh Clifford, 11th Baron Clifford of Chudleigh (1887–1962)
- Lewis Joseph Hugh Clifford, 12th Baron Clifford of Chudleigh (1889–1964)
- Lewis Hugh Clifford, 13th Baron Clifford of Chudleigh (1916–1988)
- Thomas Hugh Clifford, 14th Baron Clifford of Chudleigh (b. 1948)

The heir apparent is the present holder's son Hon. Alexander Thomas Hugh Clifford (b. 1985). At present, the second in line is his son Charles Alexander Nicholas Clifford (b. 2024).

== Line of Succession ==
- Thomas Hugh Clifford, 14th Baron Clifford of Chudleigh (b. 1948)
  - (1) The Hon. Alexander Clifford (b. 1985)
    - (2) Charles Alexander Clifford (b. 2024)
  - (3) The Hon. Edward Clifford (b. 1988)

== See also ==
- Clifford-Constable baronets
- Clifford baronets
