= Hugh Clifford, 2nd Baron Clifford of Chudleigh =

English aristocrat

Hugh Clifford

Baron Clifford of Chudleigh
- Tenure: 1673–1730
- Predecessor: Thomas Clifford
- Successor: Hugh Clifford
- Baptised: 21 December 1663; Ugbrooke, Chudleigh, Devon, England
- Died: 12 October 1730 (aged 66–67); Cannington, Somerset, England
- Spouse: Anne Preston (m. 1685)
- Issue: 15, including Hugh Clifford
- Father: Thomas Clifford
- Mother: Mary Chudleigh

Hugh Clifford, 2nd Baron Clifford of Chudleigh (21 December 1663 – 12 October 1730) was an English aristocrat.

== Early life ==
Clifford was baptized on 21 December 1663 in Ugbrooke. Though the seventh child and second son, he was the eldest living son when his father, Thomas Clifford, 1st Baron Clifford of Chudleigh, died. His mother, Elizabeth Martin, was the sister and co-heiress of William Martin, both children of William Martin of Lindridge.

He succeeded his father in the barony on his father's death in 1673.

== Personal life ==
In 1685 he married Anne Preston, who died in July 1734 in Ugbrooke and was buried on 10 July 1734. She was the daughter of Sir Thomas Preston, 3rd Baronet and Mary Molyneux, daughter of 3rd Viscount Molyneux and heiress of Quernmore Park.

They had nine sons and six daughters. Their children were:

- Hon. Francis Clifford (b. 1686, d. young)
- Hon. Thomas Clifford (12 December 1687 – 2 December 1718), buried 9 March 1719 in Cannington, Somerset. He married, as her first husband, on 22 December 1713 Charlotte Maria Livingston, 3rd Countess of Newburgh (1694–1755). Her second husband was Charles Radclyffe. They had two daughters:
  - Anne Clifford (d. 1 April 1793); married first, on 22 December 1739 at Saint Sulpice in Paris, John Joseph Mahony, 2nd Count of Mahony (d. 1757), by whom she had one daughter; married second, on 13 April 1773, Don Carlo Severino.
  - Frances Clifford, died in Ugbrooke, buried at Chudleigh Church on 7 July 1771.
- Hon. Elizabeth Clifford (1689 – 25 September 1721), married first William Constable, 4th Viscount Dunbar (1653–1718), without issue, married second on 17 November 1720 Charles Fairfax, 9th Viscount Fairfax of Emley, without issue.
- Hon. Francis Clifford (25 December 1690 – ?), died in Germany.
- Hon. William Clifford (1692–1702), died in Ugbrooke.
- Hon. Catherine Clifford (1694–?), nun at the English Benedictine Convent in Ghent.
- Hon. Mary Clifford (1695–?) nun at the English Benedictine Convent in Ghent.
- Hon. George Clifford, died an infant.
- Hon. Charles Clifford, died an infant.
- Hugh Clifford, 3rd Baron Clifford of Chudleigh (1700–1732)
- Hon. Henry Clifford (1702 – 21 August 1725), buried in Cannington.
- Hon. Anne Clifford (1704–1762), married in 1723 George Cary of Tor Abbey, Torquay, Devon, without issue.
- Hon. Amy Clifford (1705–1731), buried at Saint Pancras in London, married in 1719 as his first wife Cuthbert Tunstall Constable (d. 1740) of Burton Constable, Holderness, the nephew of both the 3rd and the 4th Viscount Dunbar. They had two sons and two daughters.
- Hon. Preston Clifford (1707–?), nun at the English Benedictine Convent in Ghent.
- Hon. Lewis Clifford (1709–?), died in Flanders.

Lord Clifford died 12 October 1730 at Cannington in Somerset, England. He was succeeded in the barony by his eldest living son.

Peerage of England
Preceded by Thomas Clifford	Baron Clifford of Chudleigh; 1673–1730	Succeeded by Hugh Clifford
