= Hugh Clifford, 7th Baron Clifford of Chudleigh =

British peer and author (1790–1858)

Hugh Charles Clifford, 7th Baron Clifford of Chudleigh (29 May 1790 – 28 February 1858) was a British peer and writer.

== Early life ==
Clifford was born on 29 May 1790 at New Park, Somerset. He was the eldest son of Charles Clifford, 6th Baron Clifford of Chudleigh, and the Hon. Eleanor Mary Arundell, a daughter of Henry Arundell, 8th Baron Arundell of Wardour.

He was educated at the Roman Catholic college of Stonyhurst, and in 1814 attended Cardinal Consalvi to the Congress of Vienna.

== Career ==
He served as a volunteer through a large portion of the Peninsular campaigns. On succeeding to his father's estates and the title upon his death on 29 April 1831, he took his seat in the House of Lords. He gave his general support to the ministry of Lord Grey and afterwards of Lord Melbourne, but seldom took part in the debates except on questions connected with Roman Catholicism. In his later years he lived chiefly in Italy, where he had a house near Tivoli.

Clifford was the author of a Letter to Edmund Burke on the Repeal of the Corn Laws (1824); Letters addressed to Lord Alvanley on his pamphlet, "The State of Ireland considered" (1841) and Letters to the Editor of the Morning Chronicle on the East Indian Question, as well as several published speeches.

== Personal life ==
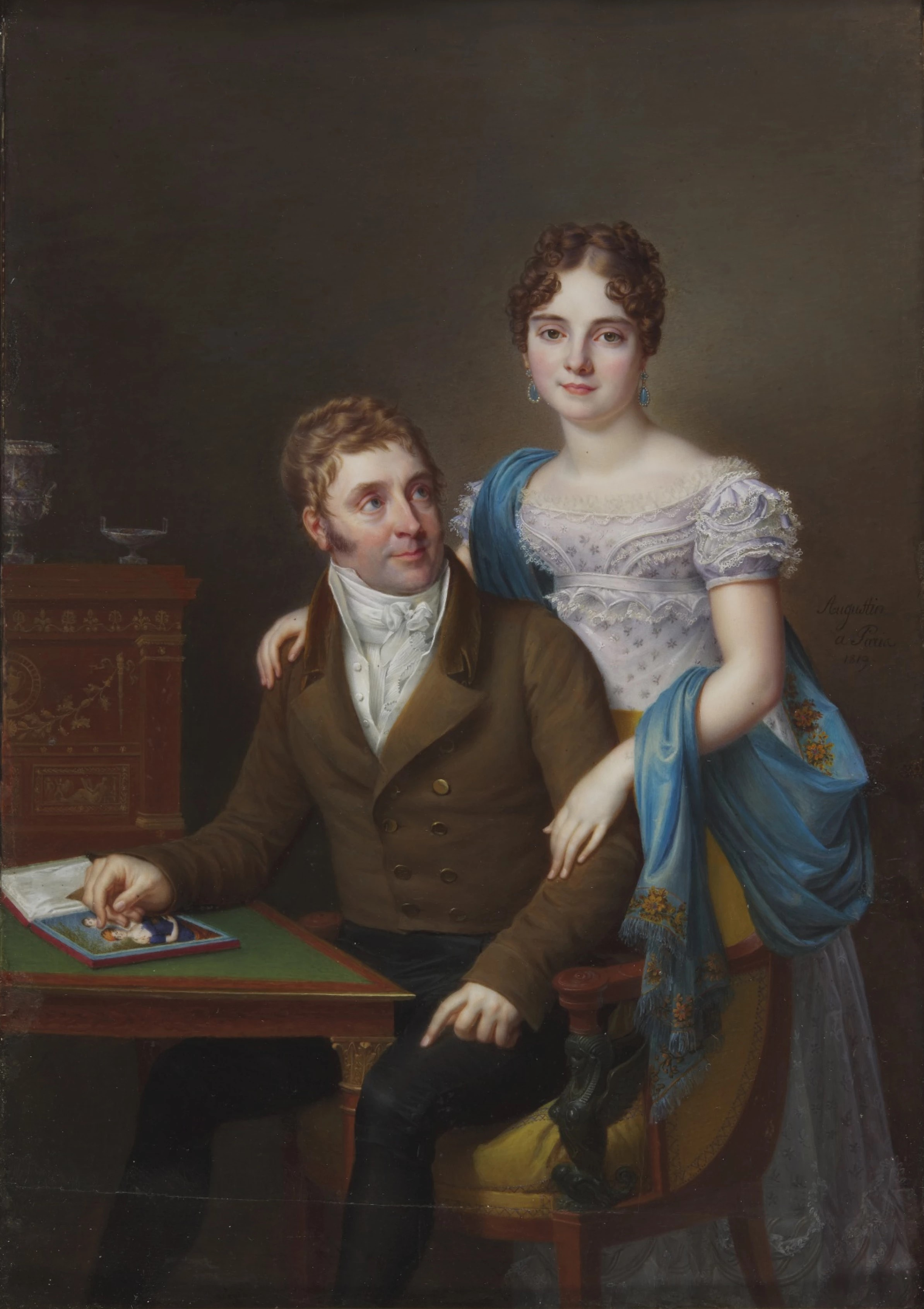
Portrait of his wife, Mary Lucy Weld, and her father, Thomas Weld, by Jean-Baptiste Jacques Augustin, 1819.

On 8 February 1819, he married Mary Lucy Weld, the only daughter of Thomas Weld of Lulworth Castle, Dorsetshire, and his wife, Lucy (née Clifford). Together, they were the parents of six sons and two daughters:

- Charles Hugh Clifford, 8th Baron Clifford of Chudleigh (1819–1880), who married Hon. Agnes Petre, daughter of William Petre, 11th Baron Petre, in 1845.
- Hon. Eleonora Mary Clifford (1820–1871), who became a Roman Catholic nun of Sacré Coeur.
- Hon. Thomas Hugh Clifford (1822–1833), who died young.
- Rt. Rev. William Hugh Joseph Clifford (1823–1893), the 2nd Bishop of Clifton.
- Hon. Mary Constantia Clifford (1825–1898), who married William Joseph Vavasour, a son of Sir Edward Vavasour, 1st Baronet and grandson of the 17th Baron Stourton.
- Sir Henry Hugh Clifford (1826–1883), who married Josephine Anstice, a daughter of Joseph Anstice, in 1857.
- Edmund Hugh Clifford, who died in infancy.
- Hon. Walter Clifford (b. 1830), who became a Roman Catholic priest.

He died at Rome on 28 February 1858 from an injury. Upon his death, he was succeeded by his eldest son, Charles Hugh, who became the 8th Baron Clifford.

=== Descendants ===
Through his son Henry, he was a grandfather of Sir Hugh Charles Clifford, and Brig.-Gen. Henry Frederick Hugh Clifford.

Peerage of England
Preceded by Charles Clifford	Baron Clifford of Chudleigh; 1831–1858	Succeeded by Charles Hugh Clifford
