= Henry Hugh Clifford =

English recipient of the Victoria Cross

Major-General The Honourable Sir Henry Hugh Clifford VC KCMG CB
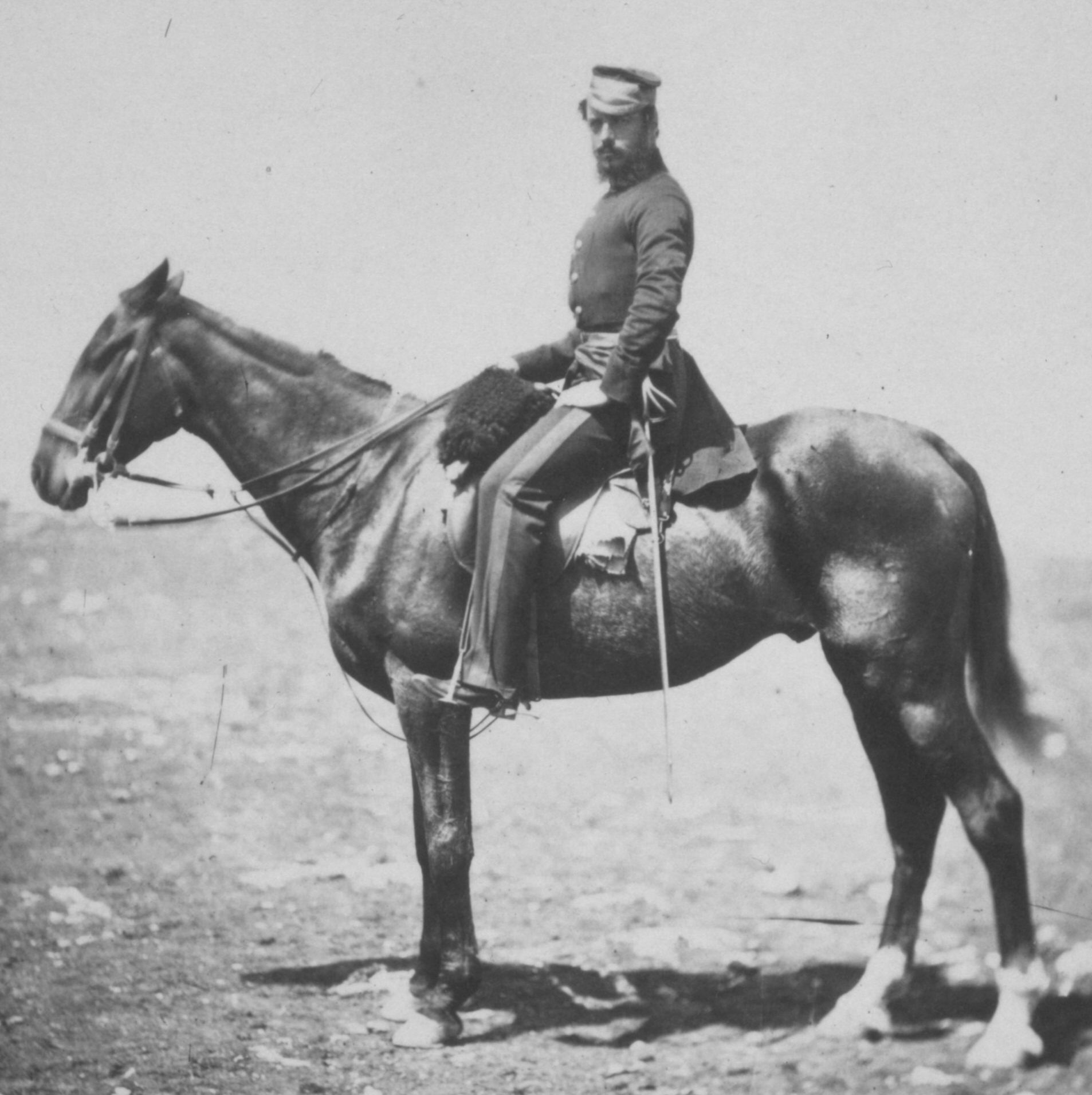
- Captain Henry Hugh Clifford in 1855
- Born: 12 September 1826; Irnham Hall, Lincolnshire
- Died: 12 April 1883 (aged 56); Ugbrooke House, Chudleigh
- Burial place: St Cyprian's Chapel, Ugbrooke House
- Relatives: Hugh Charles Clifford, 7th Baron Clifford (father); Joseph Anstice (father-in-law); Sir Hugh Clifford (son); Henry Clifford (son)
- Military career
- Allegiance: United Kingdom
- Branch: British Army
- Service years: 1846–1882
- Rank: Major-General
- Units: Rifle Brigade
- Commands: Eastern District
- Conflicts: Crimean War; Second Anglo-Chinese War; Anglo-Zulu War
- Awards: Victoria Cross; Companion of the Order of the Bath; Knight Commander of the Order of St Michael and St George; Order of the Medjidieh (Ottoman Empire)

Major-General Sir Henry Hugh Clifford, VC, KCMG, CB (12 September 1826 – 12 April 1883) was a British Army officer and a recipient of the Victoria Cross, the highest award for gallantry in the face of the enemy that can be awarded to British and Commonwealth forces.

== Early life ==
Clifford was the third son of Hugh Clifford, 7th Baron Clifford of Chudleigh by his marriage with Mary Lucy, only daughter of Thomas (afterwards Cardinal) Weld of Lulworth Castle, Dorsetshire. He was born on 12 September 1826 and received his first commission as a second lieutenant in The Rifle Brigade, on 7 August 1846.

Clifford served in South Africa against the Gaikas under Sandili in the following year, and then against the Boers until their submission at Weinberg on the Vaal river. On the outbreak of another Kaffir war in 1852 he again went to Africa, where he remained until November 1853.

== Crimean War and the Victoria Cross ==
Clifford took part in the Crimean war, where he received the appointment of aide-de-camp to Sir George Brown, commanding the light division, and was present at Alma and Inkerman, and for his gallantry in the latter battle was decorated with the Victoria Cross, by leading one of the charges, killing one of the enemy with his sword, disabling another and saving the life of a soldier (5 November 1854).

In May 1855, Clifford was appointed deputy assistant quartermaster-general, and remaining in the Crimea until the conclusion of the war was then promoted to the rank of brevet major, and received the medal and clasps for Alma, Inkerman, and Sebastopol, and from foreign governments the Legion of Honour and the 5th class of the Medjidie.

== Later career ==
On the outbreak of hostilities in China Clifford sailed thither, and as assistant quartermaster-general was present at the operations between December 1857 and January 1858 which resulted in the capture of Canton. For his services he received the brevet of lieutenant-colonel, with the China medal and Canton clasp.

On his return to England, Clifford commenced a long term of service on the staff; he was assistant quartermaster-general at Aldershot 1860–4, held a similar appointment at headquarters 1865–1868, was aide-de-camp to the commander-in-chief 1870–3, and assistant adjutant-general at headquarters 1873–5. Early in 1879, Clifford was selected to proceed to South Africa to take charge of the communications of Lord Chelmsford between Durban and the forces in the field. His task was no light one, for great confusion prevailed at Durban, the port of disembarkation; but by his great experience in staff duties, his knowledge of the requirements of the supply of an army, and, above all, by his familiarity with native warfare and his indefatigable nature, he very soon reduced everything to order, and his labours were fully acknowledged by Sir Garnet Wolseley.

Clifford was appointed a Companion of the Order of the Bath on 2 June 1869, and a Knight Commander of the Order of St Michael and St George on 19 December 1879, and was granted a pension of £100 for distinguished services on 7 October 1874. He served as General Officer Commanding Eastern District of England from April to September 1882. He died at Ugbrooke, near Chudleigh in Devon on 12 April 1883.

== Family ==
Clifford married, 21 March 1857 in Dublin, Josephine Elizabeth, the only surviving child of Joseph Anstice of Madeley Wood, Shropshire, a professor at King's College London. A son was the colonial administrator Sir Hugh Clifford. Another son was Brigadier-General Henry Frederick Hugh Clifford, who was killed in action during the First World War. Lady Clifford died in 1913 at Hampton Court Palace presumably as grace and favour of her husband's service.

Military offices
Preceded by William Pollexfen Radcliffe	GOC Eastern District; March–September 1882	Succeeded by Sir Robert White
