= Hugh Clifford, 3rd Baron Clifford of Chudleigh =

English peer (1700–1732)

Hugh Clifford 3rd Baron Clifford of Chudleigh
- Arms of Clifford: Chequy or and azure a fess gules
- Born: 14 April 1700; Chudleigh, Devon, England
- Died: 26 March 1732 (aged 31); Ugbrooke, Devon, England
- Resting place: Ugbrooke, Devon
- Spouse: Elizabeth Blount (m. 1725)
- Children: 6
- Parents: Hugh Clifford, 2nd Baron Clifford of Chudleigh (father); Anne Preston (mother)

Hugh Clifford, 3rd Baron Clifford of Chudleigh (14 April 1700 – 26 March 1732) of Ugbrooke House near Chudleigh in Devon, was a peer.

== Origins ==
He was the son of Hugh Clifford, 2nd Baron Clifford of Chudleigh (died 1730) by his wife Anne Preston.

== Career ==
He succeeded his father as baron in 1730, but survived him by only two years when he was succeeded by his eldest son.

== Marriage and children ==
In 1725 he married Elizabeth Blount, a daughter of Edward Blount of Blagdon in the parish of Paignton in Devon, 3rd son of George Blount, 2nd Baronet, of Sodington Hall in the parish of Mamble in Worcestershire, by his wife Annabella Guise, a daughter of Sir John Guise, 2nd Baronet of Elmore, Gloucestershire. By his wife he had six children, four sons and two daughters.

== Death and burial ==
He died on 26 March 1732 and was buried at Ugbrooke.

== Notes ==
Peerage of England
Preceded by Hugh Clifford	Baron Clifford of Chudleigh; 1730–1732	Succeeded by Hugh Clifford
