= Thomas Clifford, 14th Baron Clifford of Chudleigh =

British hereditary peer and British Army officer

The Right Honourable The Lord Clifford of Chudleigh
- Born: 17 March 1948 (age 78)
- Parents: Colonel The Right Hon. Lewis Hugh Clifford, 13th Baron Clifford of Chudleigh (father); * The Honourable Katharine Vavasseur Fisher (mother)
- Occupation: Hereditary peer and former British Army officer

Thomas Hugh Clifford, 14th Baron Clifford of Chudleigh, DL (born 17 March 1948), is a British hereditary peer and former British Army officer.

== Background ==
He is the first son of the late colonel The Right Hon. Lewis Hugh Clifford, 13th Baron Clifford of Chudleigh, and The Honourable Katharine Vavasseur Fisher. Through his mother he is a great-grandson of Admiral of the Fleet John Fisher, 1st Baron Fisher.

He was educated at Downside School. He was appointed a deputy lieutenant of Devon in 1998.

== Succession ==
On his father's death in 1988 he succeeded him as Baron Clifford of Chudleigh.

== Marriages and issue ==
He has married twice.

First: to Suzanne Austin on 15 December 1980. A daughter and two sons:

1. The Hon. Georgina Apollonia Clifford.
2. The Hon. Alexander Thomas Hugh Clifford.
3. The Hon. Edward George Clifford.

This marriage ended by process of divorce in 1992.

Second: to Clarissa Goodall on 21 November 1994. No children.

He is the honorary colonel of the Royal Devon Yeomanry and is also the deputy president of Devon Scout County, part of The Scout Association.

Alexander Clifford appeared on the U.S. reality show Filthy Rich: Cattle Drive.

Peerage of England
Preceded by Lewis Clifford	Baron Clifford of Chudleigh; 1988–present	Incumbent
