= Australian pioneers =

Australian pioneers may refer to:

== Settlers of Australia ==
- Settlers of Australia

== Military ==
=== World War I - First Australian Imperial Force ===
- 1st Pioneer Battalion (New South Wales), 1st Division
- 2nd Pioneer Battalion (Western Australia), 2nd Division
- 3rd Pioneer Battalion (Victoria, Queensland, South Australia, Western Australia), 3rd Division
- 4th Pioneer Battalion (Queensland), 4th Division
- 5th Pioneer Battalion (South Australia), 5th Division

=== World War II - Second Australian Imperial Force ===
- 2/1st Pioneer Battalion (Australia)
- 2/2nd Pioneer Battalion (Australia)
- 2/3rd Pioneer Battalion (Australia)
- 2/4th Pioneer Battalion (Australia)
