= Ugbrooke =

Country house in Devon, England

Coordinates: 50.59086°N 3.59067°W

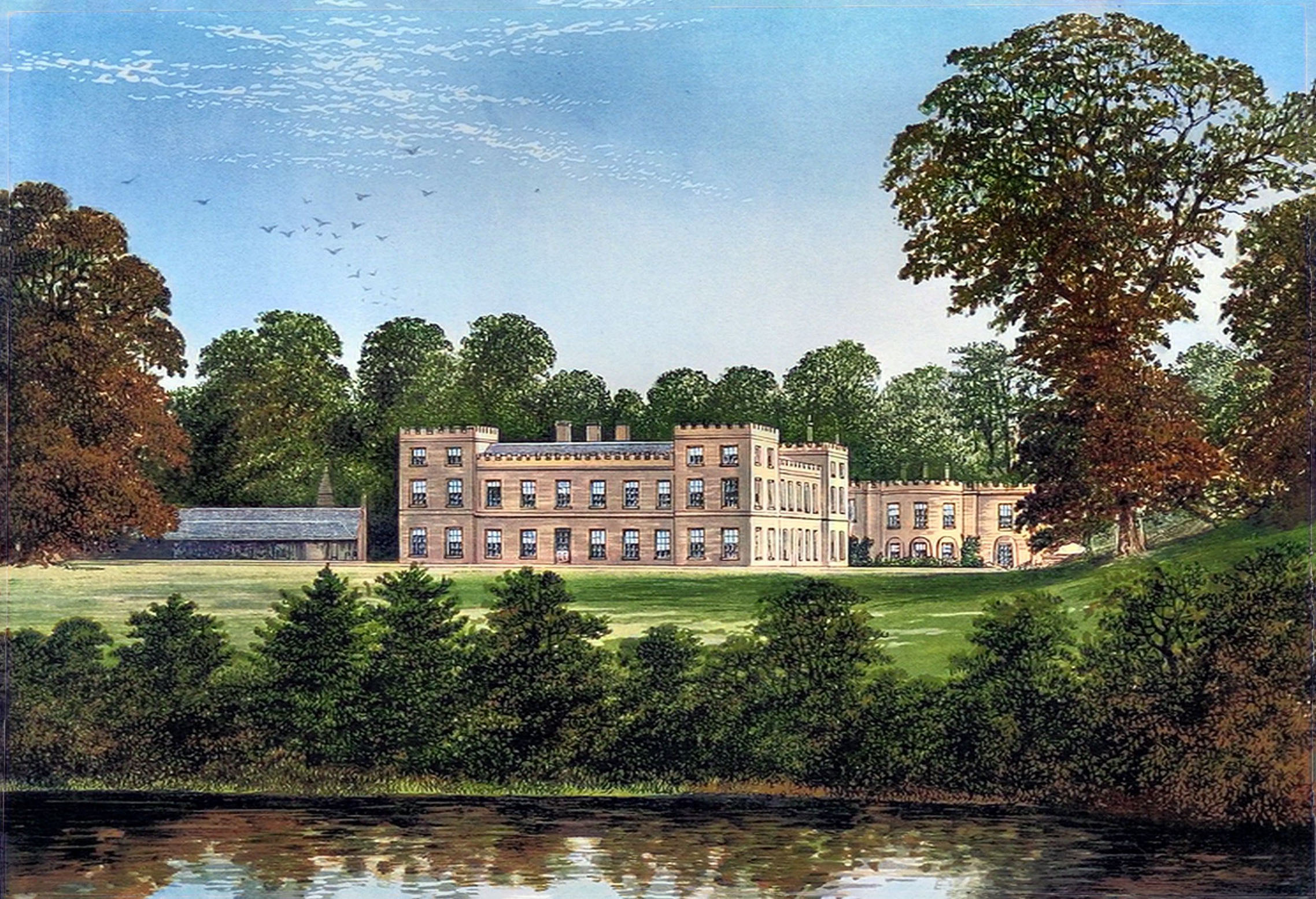
Ugbrooke in Devon, from Morris's County Seats (1869)

Ugbrooke House is a stately home in the parish of Chudleigh, Devon, England, situated in a valley between Exeter and Newton Abbot. The home of the Clifford family, the house and grounds are available for guided tours in summer and as an event venue.

== History ==
It dates back over 900 years, having featured in the Domesday Book of 1086. Before the Reformation the land belonged to the Church and the house was occupied by Precentors to the Bishop of Exeter. The property came into the possession of the Courtenays of Powderham Castle. In 1604 it passed to Thomas Clifford, grandson of the widow of Piers Courtnay. It has been the seat of the Clifford family for over four hundred years, and the owners have held the title Baron Clifford of Chudleigh since 1672.

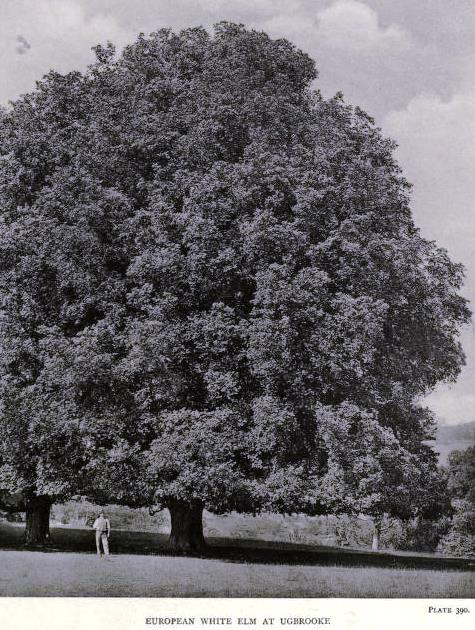
European White Elm at Ugbrooke, 1908

The house, now a Grade I listed building, was remodelled by Robert Adam, while the grounds were redesigned by Capability Brown in 1761. The grounds featured what were possibly the earliest plantings of the European White Elm, Ulmus laevis, in the UK. The gardens are now Grade II* listed in the National Register of Historic Parks and Gardens.

On 14 June 1796 Thomas Weld of Lulworth Castle, a member of an old recusant family, married, at Ugbrooke, Lucy Bridget Clifford, granddaughter of the 3rd Baron Clifford of Chudleigh. On the death of his wife (1815) and the marriage of his only daughter to the 7th Baron Clifford of Chudleigh (1818), with no further family responsibilities he became a priest (1821), and kept a poor orphanage in London. Asked for as Bishop of Upper Canada, he was consecrated in 1826 at St Edmund's College, Ware, but his daughter's failing health delayed his departure for Canada, and he resigned his vicariate. In 1830, while visiting Rome, he was raised to the cardinalate.

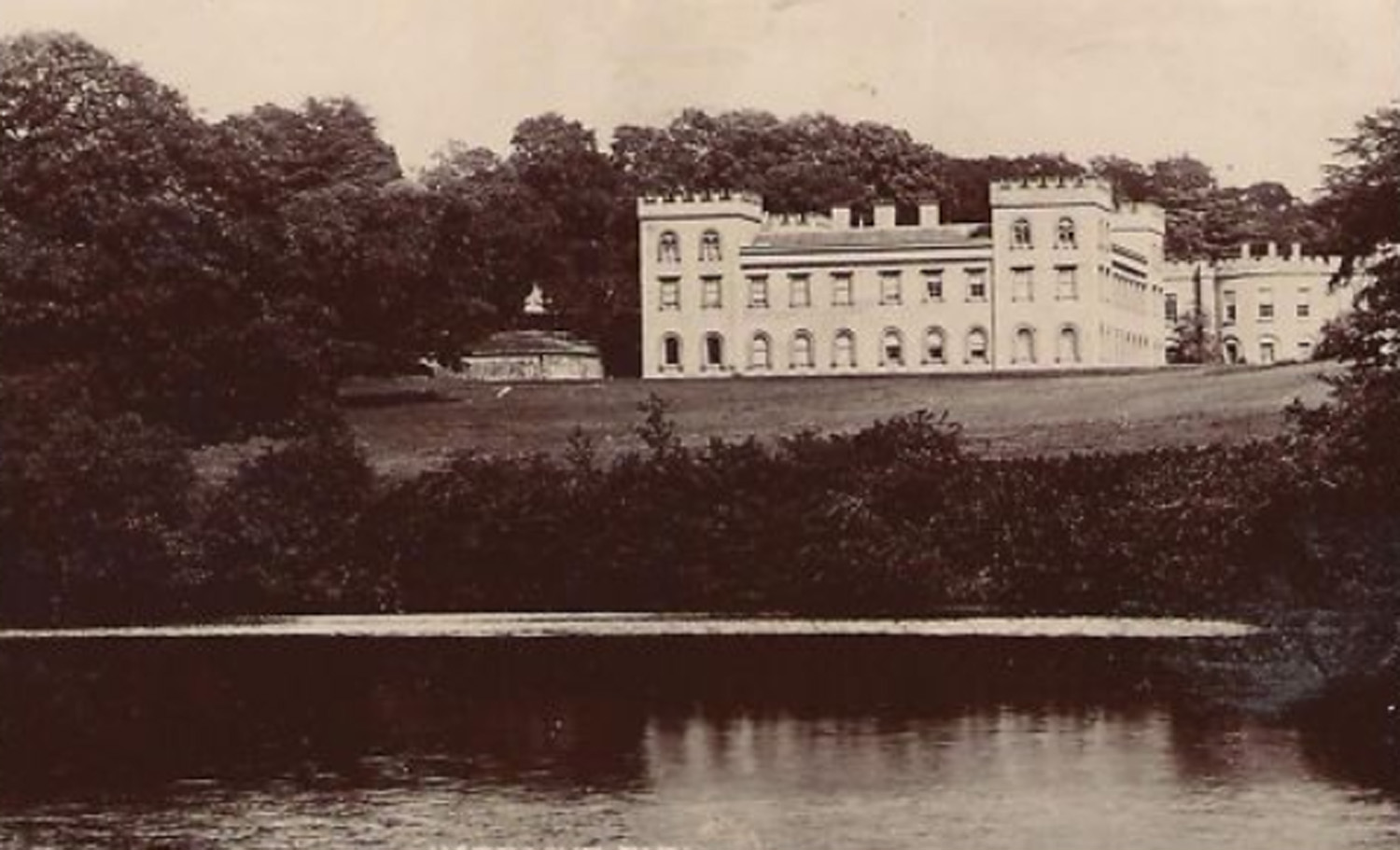
Ugbrooke House in 1908

Lewis Henry Hugh Clifford, 9th Baron Clifford of Chudleigh (1851–1916), was an aide-de-camp to Edward VII and entertained royalty, both Edward VII and George V, at Ugbrooke Park.

Writer Agatha Christie met her first husband, Archie Christie, at a ball at Ugbrooke House on 12 October, 1912.

During the Second World War, the house was requisitioned as a school.

== St. Cyprian's Chapel ==
Originally an Anglican Chapel, it was rededicated in 1673 when Thomas Clifford, 1st Baron Clifford of Chudleigh, became a Catholic. Subsequent Barons added a Lady Chapel, Baptistry, and an organ loft. The Dominican Father James Dominic Darbyshire came to Ugbrooke and remained there until his death in 1757. Catholics in the area came to St. Cyprian's for services. In 1813, there were about 100 in attendance, served by a French émigré priest Felix Vauquelin, who lived at Ugbrooke. Priests in residence at Ugbrooke were responsible for tutoring the Clifford children, and providing pastoral care to the surrounding communities. The Synod which set out the organisation of the new Plymouth diocese took place there in 1854. Eventually parishes were established in Bovey Tracey and Chudleigh. Ugbrooke retains close ties with Buckfast Abbey in Devon, founded in part through the generosity of the 9th Baron.

== Present day ==
The house and gardens are open to the public for a limited number of days each summer for guided tours. Refreshments are available at the Orangery Tearoom, including a Devon cream tea.

As part of Holy Spirit Parish in Bovey Tracey, Mass continues to this day, every Sunday morning at 8.45am.

Lord & Lady Clifford live in a coach house on the grounds, while Lord Clifford's heir and his wife, The Hon. Mr. & Mrs. Alexander Clifford live in the main. house.

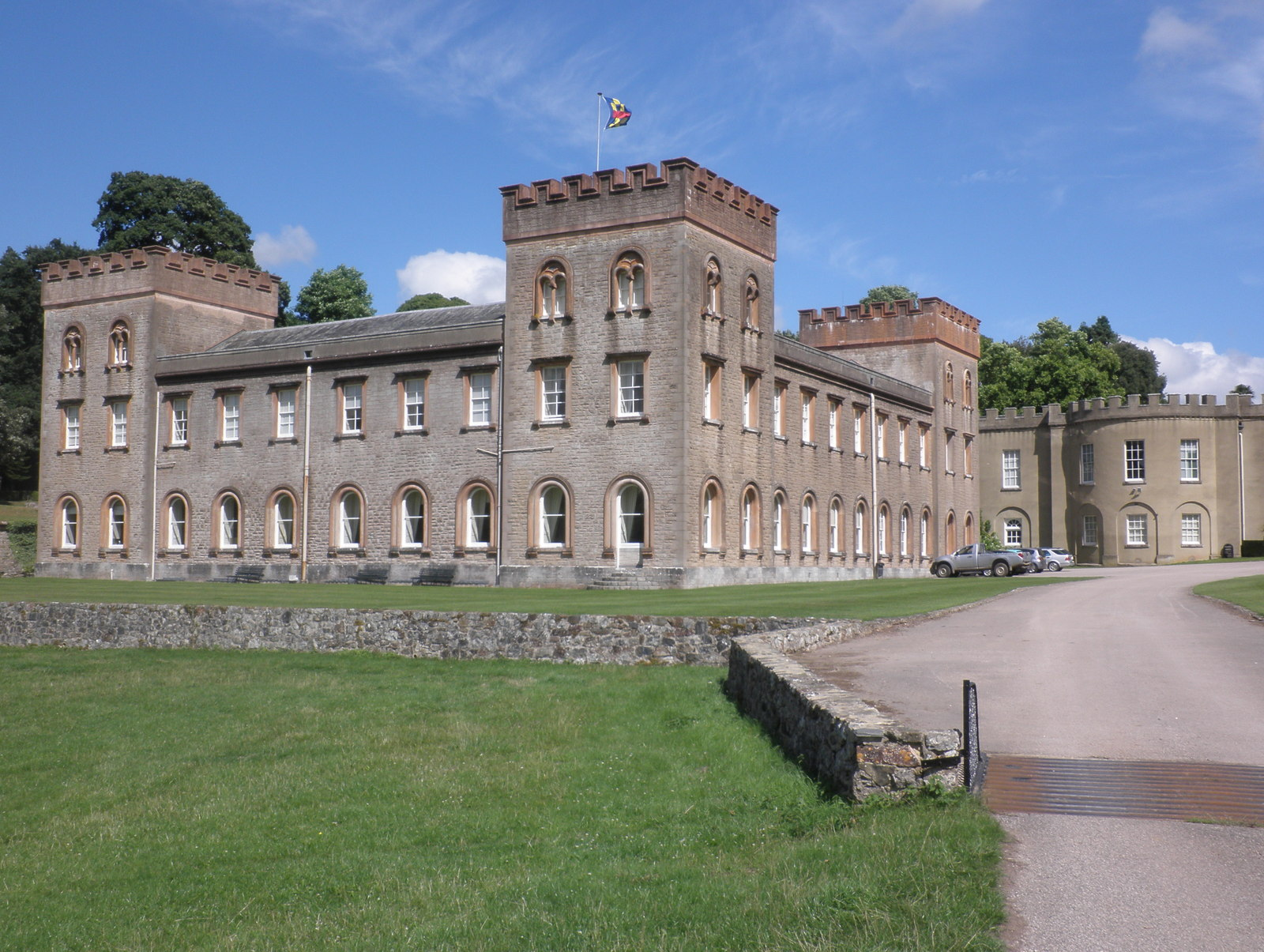
Ugbrooke House, Chudleigh

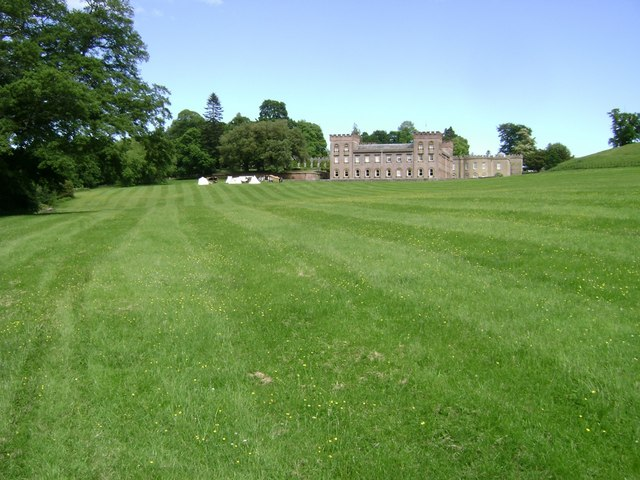
Ugbrooke House and its park

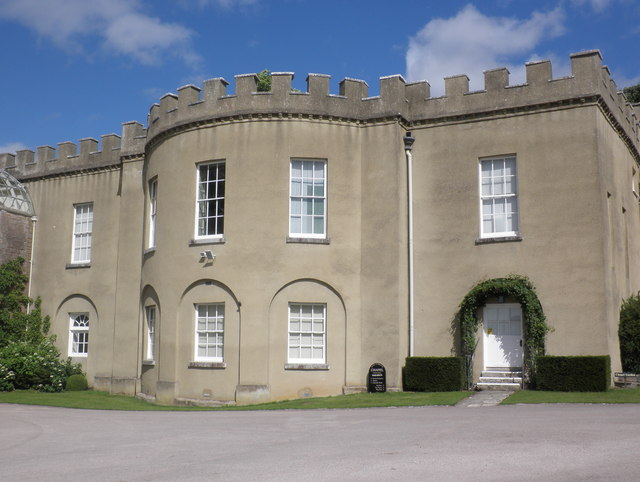
St Cyprian's Chapel, Ugbrooke House, Chudleigh

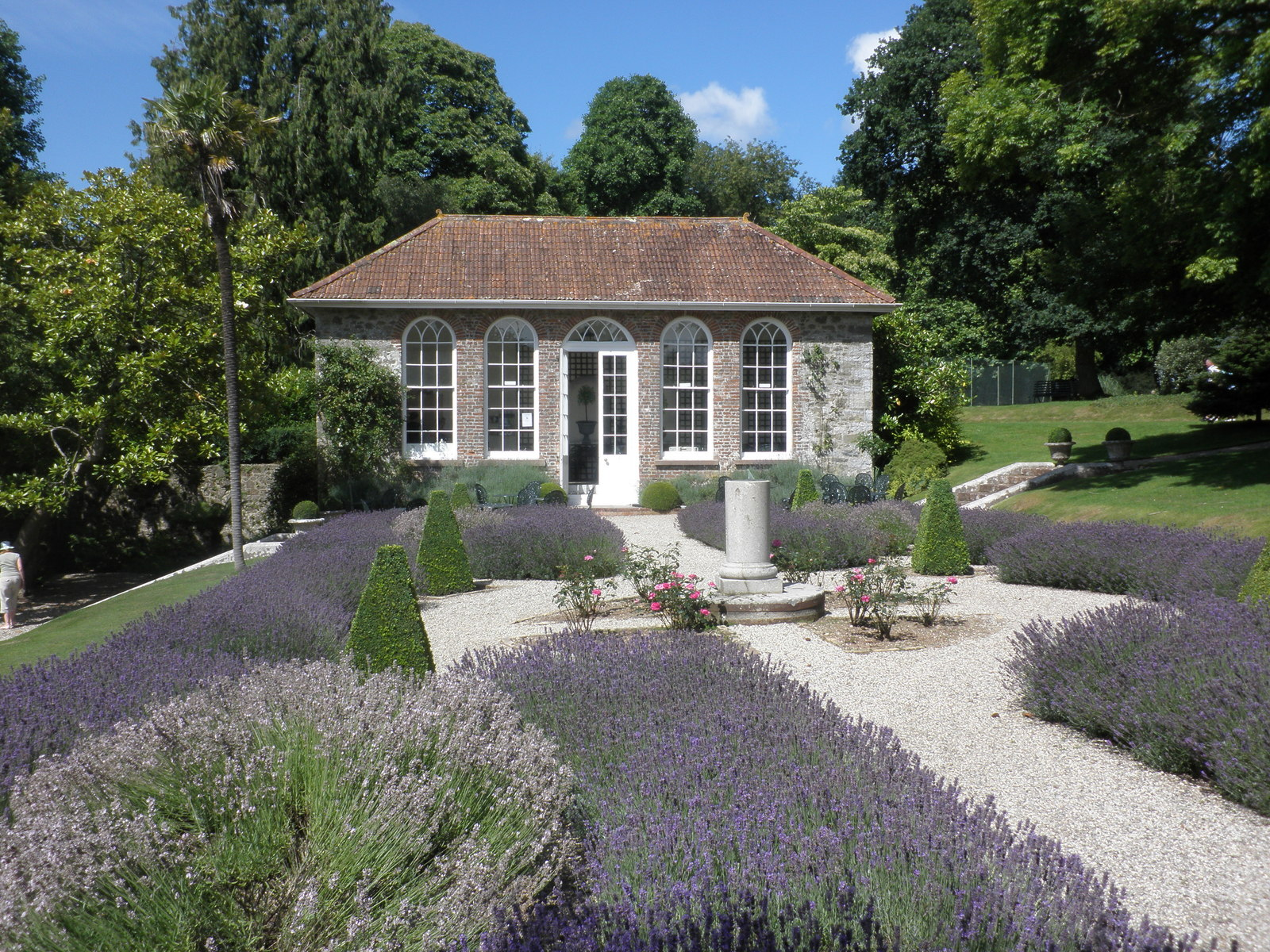
The Orangery, Ugbrooke Park
