= Henry Clifford (British Army officer) =

British Army officer

Brigadier-General Henry Clifford DSO
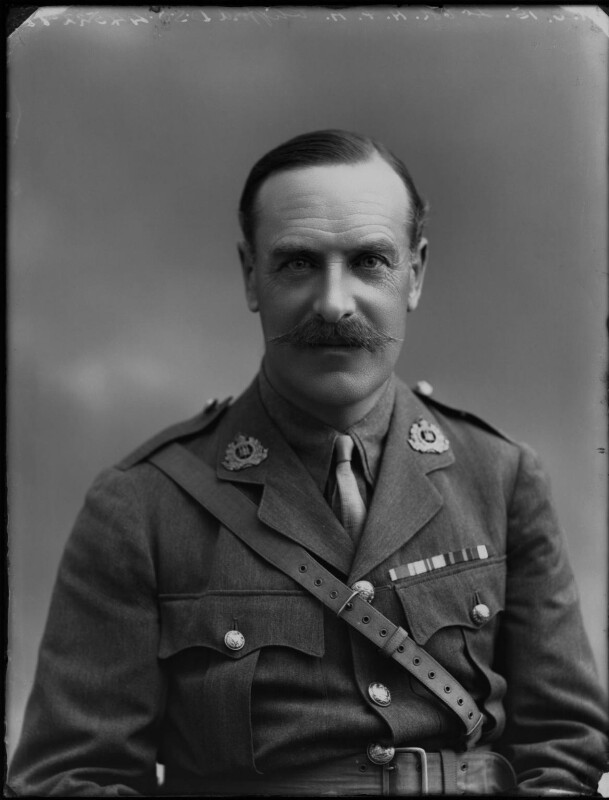
- Born: 13 August 1867; Brompton, Kent, England
- Died: 11 September 1916 (aged 49); Longueval, France
- Burial place: Albert Communal Cemetery Extension (War Graves)
- Relatives: Major-General Sir Henry Hugh Clifford (father); Sir Hugh Clifford (brother)
- Military career
- Allegiance: United Kingdom
- Branch: British Army
- Service years: 1888–1916
- Rank: Brigadier-General
- Unit: Suffolk Regiment
- Commands: 149th (Northumberland) Brigade; 1st Battalion Suffolk Regiment
- Conflicts: Second Boer War; First World War
- Awards: Distinguished Service Order; Mentioned in Despatches; Order of Saint Stanislaus, 3rd Class (Russia)

Brigadier-General Henry Frederick Hugh Clifford, DSO (13 August 1867 – 11 September 1916) was a British Army officer. He was killed in action during the Battle of the Somme while inspecting trenches. At the time, he was commanding the 149th (Northumberland) Brigade.

== Biography ==
Clifford was the second son of Major-General Sir Henry Hugh Clifford. His elder brother was the colonial administrator Sir Hugh Clifford. He entered the British Army, joining the Suffolk Regiment in February 1888 after graduating from the Royal Military College, Sandhurst, was promoted to captain in October 1897, and served in the Second Boer War.

On 4 August 1902 he was seconded for service on the staff and appointed as an aide-de-camp to Lieutenant General Sir William Butler.

He was promoted to lieutenant colonel in September 1914, shortly after the outbreak of the First World War.

He was awarded the Distinguished Service Order (DSO) in February 1915, Clifford was wounded by a sniper the same year. On 29 June 1915, he succeeded Brigadier General Geoffrey Feilding as general officer commanding (GOC) of the 149th (Northumberland) Brigade, receiving a promotion to the temporary rank of brigadier general whilst so employed.

In September 1916, during the Battle of the Somme, he was killed on the Somme by a German sniper.
