= Joseph Anstice =

English classical scholar and professor

Joseph Anstice (1808 – 29 February 1836) was an English classical scholar, and for four years professor of classical literature in King's College London.

== Biography ==
Anstice born at Madeley Wood Hall, Madeley, Shropshire, second son of William Anstice, a local mine owner. He was educated at a private school at Enmore, Somerset, and at Westminster School and Christ Church, Oxford (where he was president of the Oxford Union), taking his BA on 3 February 1831, and M.A. on 2 April 1835. In 1831 he was appointed professor of classical literature in King's College, London, a post which he resigned in 1835 from ill-health. He died on 29 February 1836 at Torquay.

== Works ==
He published:

1. Richard Cœur de Lion’ (prize poem), 1828.
2. Introductory Lecture at King's College, London, 1831.
3. Selections from the Choric Poetry of the Greek Dramatic Writers, translated into English Verse, 1832.
4. The Influence of the Roman Conquests upon Literature and the Arts in Rome (in Oxford English Prize Essays), 1836.
5. The Child's Christian Year, 1841, was partly his work.

In addition, Anstice wrote over fifty hymns, mostly during his dying period in Torquay.
