= Bigod family =

Ruling family of Norfolk

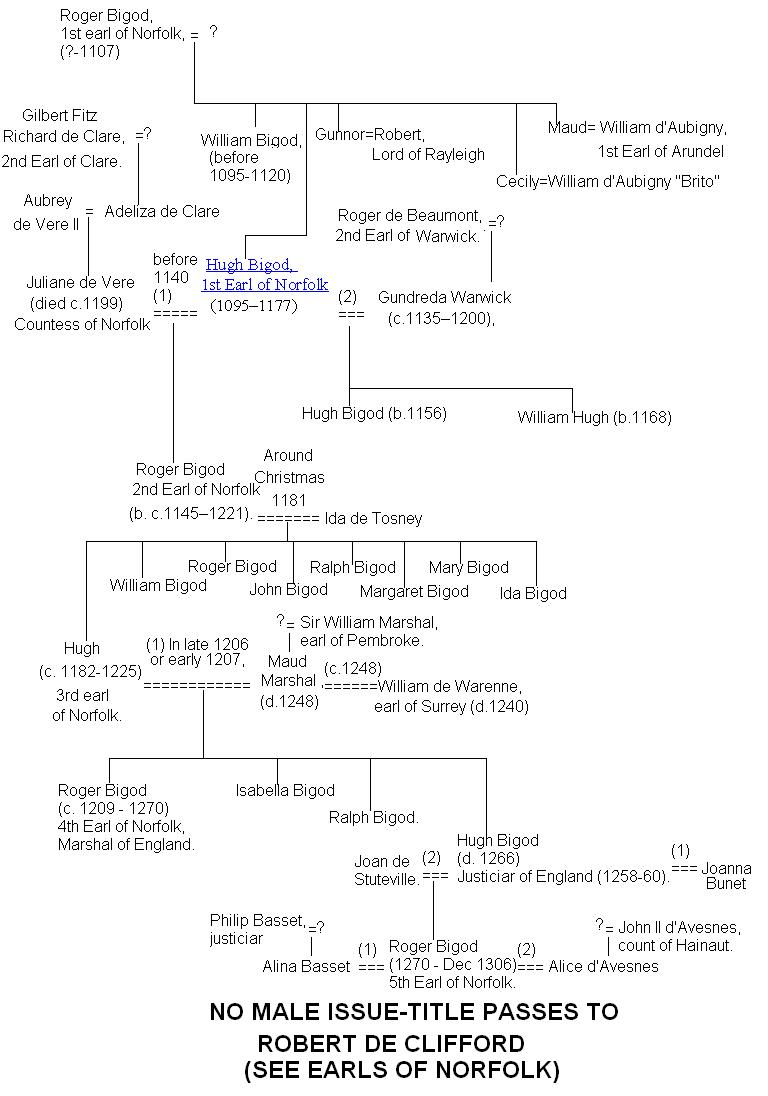

The Bigod family was a medieval Norman family, the second Earls of Norfolk, the first being Ralph de Guader.

== Succession ==
- Roger Bigod, 1st Earl of Norfolk, father of the true 1st Earl
- Hugh Bigod, 1st Earl of Norfolk (1095–1177), second son, and heir, of Roger Bigod, founder of the English family of this name
- Roger Bigod, 2nd Earl of Norfolk, son and heir of 1st earl
- Hugh Bigod, 3rd Earl of Norfolk (1186–1225), son and heir of 2nd earl
- Roger Bigod, 4th Earl of Norfolk, son of 3rd earl. No male issue, passes to nephew Roger
- Roger Bigod, 5th Earl of Norfolk, son of Hugh Bigod (Justiciar), heir of 4th earl. No male issue; lands and titles revert to crown

== Other ==
- William Bigod, first son of Roger Bigod, 1st Earl of Norfolk, lost in the White Ship Disaster
- William Hugh Bigod, other son of 2nd Earl
- Hugh Bigod, second son of Hugh Bigod, 1st Earl of Norfolk (more specifically first son by second marriage)
- Hugh Bigod (Justiciar) (?–1266), the youngest son of 3rd earl, father of 5th earl
- Sir Francis Bigod
- Bigod's Rebellion

== See also ==
- Framlingham Castle
- Bungay Castle
- Orford Castle
- The Anarchy
- First Barons' War
- Second Barons' War
- House of Burgh
