= Hugh Bigod, 3rd Earl of Norfolk =

Norman noble (c. 1183–1225)

Hugh Bigod
- 3rd Earl of Norfolk
- Arms of Bigod (dropped post-1269 by Roger Bigod, 5th Earl of Norfolk): Or, a cross gules
- Tenure: 1221–1225
- Predecessor: Roger Bigod, 2nd Earl of Norfolk
- Successor: Roger Bigod, 4th Earl of Norfolk
- Born: c. 1182
- Died: 18 February 1225
- Spouse: Maud Marshal
- Issue: Roger Bigod, 4th Earl of Norfolk; Hugh Bigod; Isabel Bigod; Ralph Bigod
- Parents: Roger Bigod, 2nd Earl of Norfolk; Ida de Tosny

Hugh Bigod (c. 1182 – 18 February 1225) was a member of the powerful early Norman Bigod family and was for a short time the 3rd Earl of Norfolk.

== Origins ==
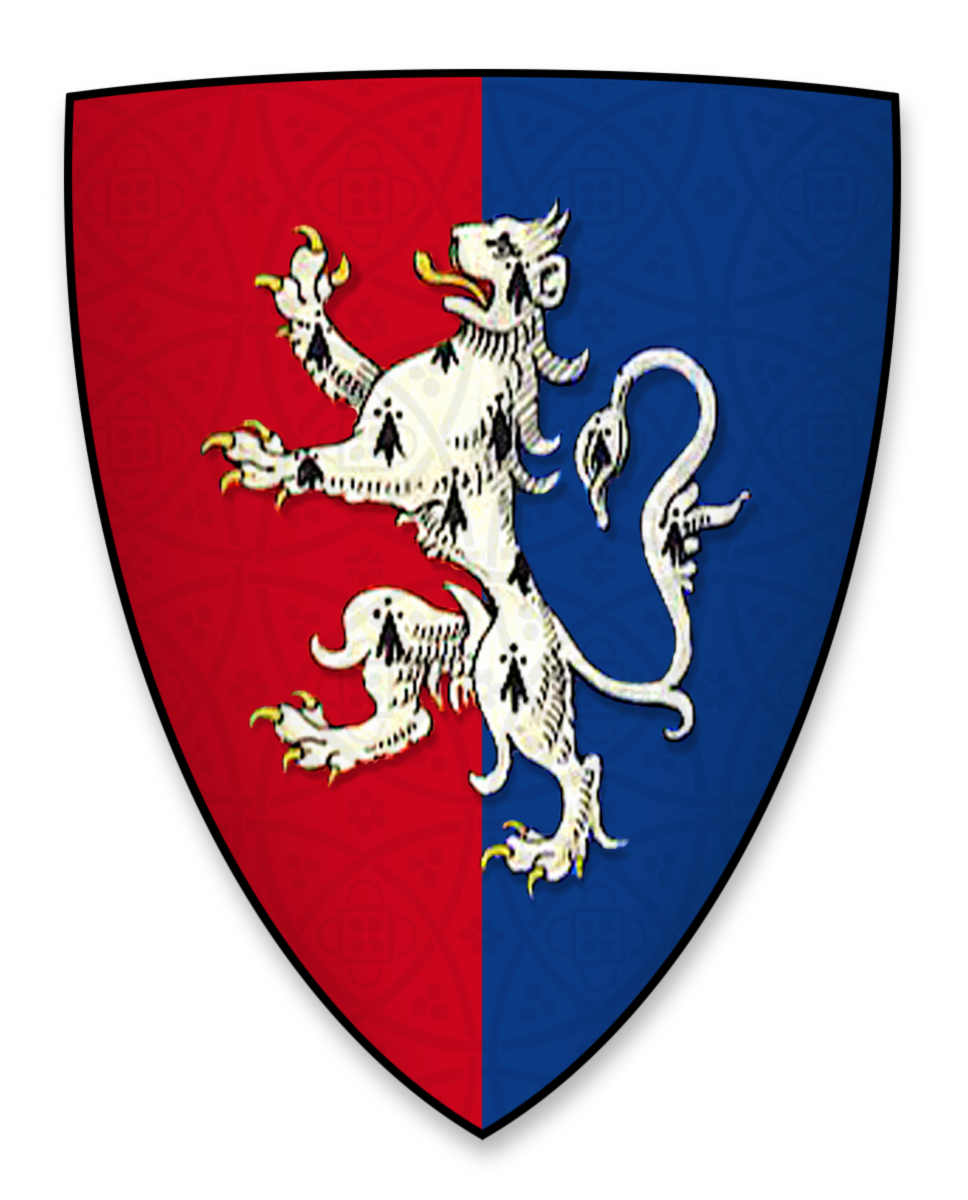
Arms used by Hugh Bigod, as heir to the earldoms of Norfolk and Suffolk, and as recorded during the signing of Magna Charta

He was born c. 1182, the eldest son of Roger Bigod, 2nd Earl of Norfolk by his wife Ida de Tosny.

== Career ==
In 1215, he and his father were one of the twenty-five sureties of Magna Carta of King John. He succeeded to his father's estates (including Framlingham Castle) in 1221.

== Marriage and children ==
In late 1206 or early 1207, Hugh married Maud Marshal, also known as Matilda Marshall, (1192 – 27 March 1248), daughter of William Marshal, 1st Earl of Pembroke (1147–1219), Marshal of England, by his wife Isabel de Clare, 4th Countess of Pembroke. They had four, or possibly five, children:

- Roger Bigod, 4th Earl of Norfolk (c. 1209–1270), died childless. Sometimes known as Roger III Bigod.
- Hugh Bigod (1211–1266), Justiciar of England. Married Joan de Stuteville, by whom he had issue, including Roger Bigod, 5th Earl of Norfolk.
- Isabel Bigod (c. 1212–1250), married twice: Firstly to Gilbert de Lacy (son of Walter de Lacy, Lord of Meath and his wife Margaret de Braose), by whom she had issue; Secondly to John FitzGeoffrey, Lord of Shere, Justiciar of Ireland, by whom she had issue, including Maud FitzJohn, and Joan FitzJohn who married Theobald le Botiller, and from whom descended the Irish Earls of Ormond.
- Ralph Bigod (born c. 1215).

There is some dispute about the existence of another son, Sir Simon Bigod, which was asserted by Frederick Lewis Weis in his book Ancestral Roots of Sixty Colonists who Came to New England between 1623 and 1650, as the third born son. A man of that name appears as a witness to one of Earl Hugh's charters (Morris, HBII 2), but as the eighteenth name in a list of twenty, suggesting no close connection to the main branch of the family. Simon Bigod is also named among the knights who surrendered to King John at Framlingham Castle in 1216. Simon is recognized as the third son of Hugh Bigod in Francis Blomefield's "North Erpingham Hundred: Felbrigg". He is also recognized by Gary Boyd Roberts in The Royal Descents of 600 Immigrants to the American Colonies or the United States, Vol 1, p. 528. It is possible that Simon Bigod was in reality a descendant of Hugh or William Bigod, half-brothers to Roger Bigod, 2nd Earl of Norfolk.

== Death ==
Hugh died on 18 February 1225. Very soon after Hugh's death, his widow Maud remarried William de Warenne, 5th Earl of Surrey.

== Hugh Bigod in fiction ==
Hugh Bigod and his wife [Mahelt] are the main characters in Elizabeth Chadwick's To Defy a King. They also appear as secondary characters in novels chronicling their parents such as The Time of Singing (UK: Sphere, 2008) published in the USA as For the King's Favor; The Greatest Knight; and The Scarlet Lion.

== Ancestry ==
Ancestors of Hugh Bigod, 3rd Earl of Norfolk

8. Roger Bigod
4. Hugh Bigod, 1st Earl of Norfolk
9. Adeliza de Tosny
2. Roger Bigod, 2nd Earl of Norfolk
10. Aubrey de Vere
5. Juliane de Vere
11. Adeliza de Clare
1. Hugh Bigod, 3rd Earl of Norfolk
12. Roger de Tosny, Lord of Flamstead
6. Raoul de Tosny, Lord of Flamstead
13. Gertrude de Hainaut
3. Ida de Tosny
14. Robert de Beaumont, 2nd Earl of Leicester
7. Margaret de Beaumont
15. Amice de Gaël

Hugh Bigod, 3rd Earl of Norfolk Bigod family Born: c. 1182 Died: 1225
Preceded by Roger Bigod	Earl of Norfolk; 1221–1225	Succeeded by Roger Bigod
Peerage of England
Preceded by Roger Bigod	Earl of Norfolk; 1221–1225	Succeeded by Roger Bigod
