= Roger Bigod, 2nd Earl of Norfolk =

English diplomat and royal steward (c.1140s–1221)

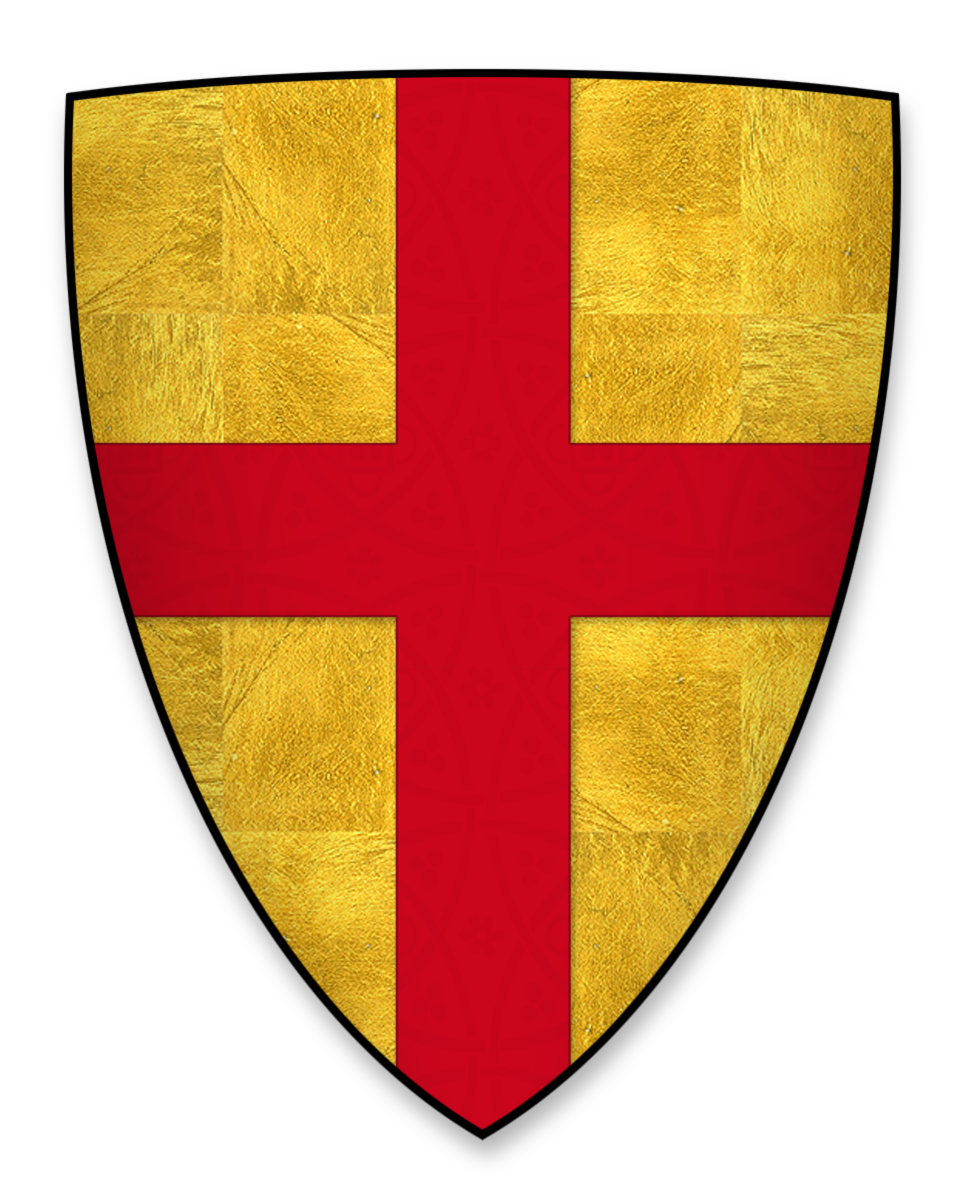
- Arms adopted by Roger Bigod, 2nd Earl of Norfolk, at the start of the Age of Heraldry c. 1200–1215 (dropped after 1269 by Roger Bigod, 5th Earl of Norfolk): Or, a cross gules
- Born: c. 1144/1150
- Died: 1221
- Noble family: Bigod family
- Spouse: Ida de Tosny
- Issue: Hugh Bigod, 3rd Earl of Norfolk; William Bigod; Ralph Bigod; Roger Bigod; Margery de Hastings; Mary Bigod
- Father: Hugh Bigod, 1st Earl of Norfolk
- Mother: Juliana de Vere

Roger Bigod (c. 1144/1150 – 1221) was the son of Hugh Bigod, 1st Earl of Norfolk and his first wife, Juliana de Vere. Although his father died in 1176 or 1177, Roger did not succeed to the earldom of Norfolk until 1189 for his claim had been disputed by his stepmother for her sons by Earl Hugh in the reign of Henry II. King Richard I confirmed him in his earldom and other honours, and also sent him as an ambassador to France in the same year. Roger inherited his father's office as royal steward. He took part in the negotiations for the release of Richard from prison, and after the king's return to England became a justiciar.

During the Revolt of 1173–74, Roger remained loyal to the king while his father sided with the king's rebellious sons. Roger fought at the Battle of Fornham on 17 October 1173, where the royalist force defeated a rebel force led by Robert de Beaumont, 3rd Earl of Leicester.

In most of the years of the reign of King John, the earl was frequently with the king or on royal business. Yet Bigod was to be one of the leaders of the baronial party which obtained John's assent to Magna Carta, and his name and that of his son and heir Hugh II appear among the twenty-five barons who were to ensure the king's adherence to the terms of that document.

The pair were excommunicated by the pope in December 1215, and in 1216 John marched to East Anglia with a force of mercenaries and laid siege to Roger's seat of Framlingham Castle. Bigod was away, but Framlingham's garrison had 26 knights, 20 sergeants-at-arms, 7 crossbowmen, 1 chaplain and 3 others, perhaps enough to hold out until Roger returned to command support. Yet the castle surrendered after two days, most likely for political expediency. The loss of the castle was temporary - Bigod made peace with the regents of John's son Henry III in 1217 - but Bigod seems to have retired from public life after this time. He died in 1221, his lands intact, the Bigod powerhouse secured and himself a respected figure.

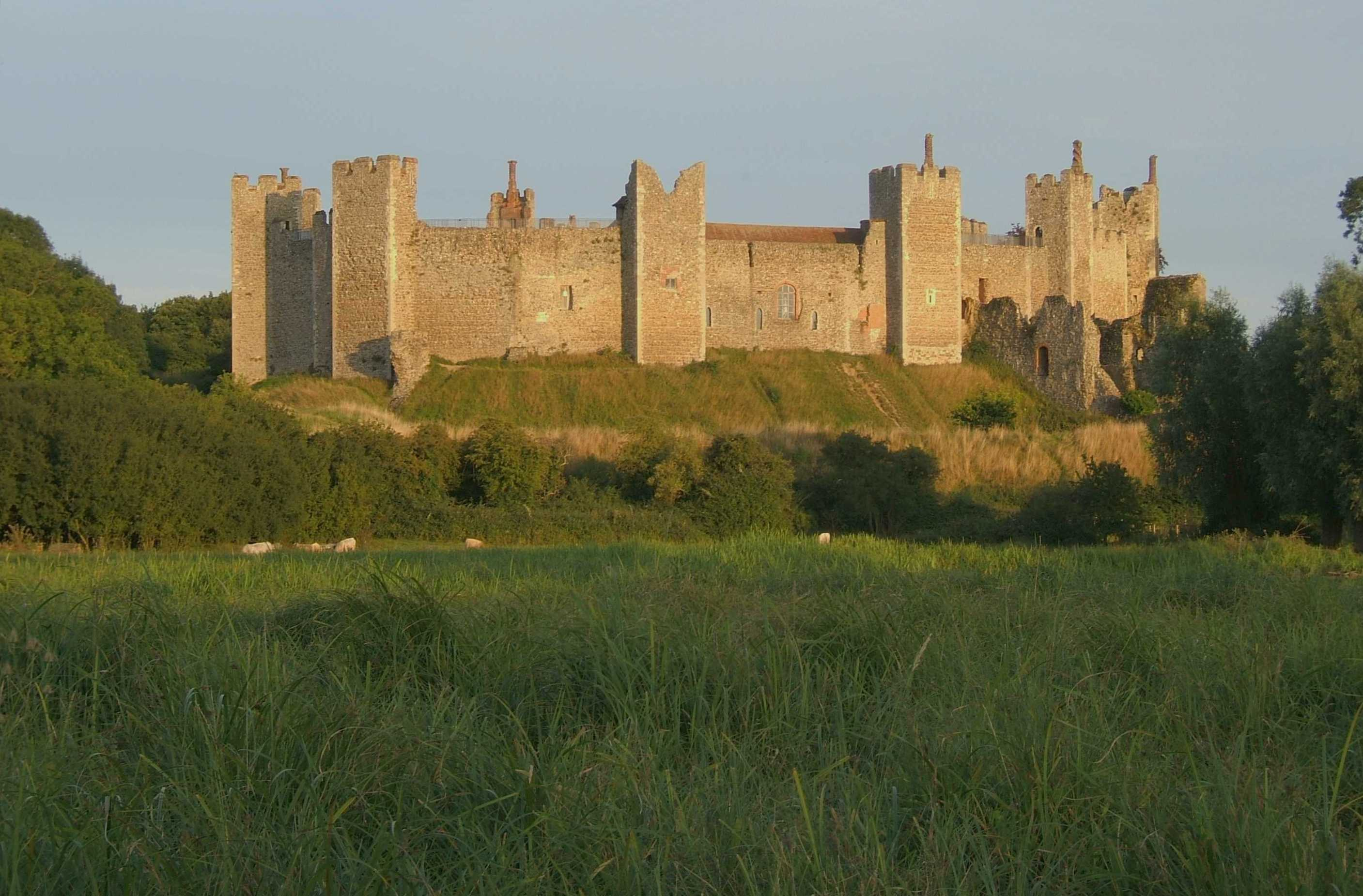
Framlingham Castle, Bigod’s main seat

Around Christmas 1181, Bigod married Ida, apparently Ida de Tosny (or Ida de Toesny), and by her had a number of children including:

1. Hugh Bigod, 3rd Earl of Norfolk who married in 1206/1207, Maud, a daughter of William Marshal
2. William Bigod
3. Ralph Bigod
4. Roger Bigod
5. Margery, married William de Hastings
6. Mary Bigod, married Ralph fitz Robert

Many historians, including Marc Morris, have speculated that the couple had a third daughter, Alice, who married Aubrey de Vere IV, Earl of Oxford as his second wife. If so, the marriage would have been well within the bounds of consanguinity, for the couple would have been quite closely related, a daughter of the second earl of Norfolk being first cousin once removed to the second earl of Oxford.

== Roger Bigod in fiction ==
Roger Bigod and his wife Ida De Tosny are the main characters in Elizabeth Chadwick's The Time of Singing (Sphere, 2008), published in the USA as For the King's Favor. They appear as minor characters in other of her books set at the same time, notably To Defy a King, which concerns the marriage of their son Hugh to Maud, a daughter of William Marshal. As Bigot, Bigod also appears as a character in the play King John by William Shakespeare.

Peerage of England
Preceded by Hugh Bigod	Earl of Norfolk; 1177–1221	Succeeded by Hugh Bigod
