= Walton Castle, Suffolk =

Roman fort in Suffolk, England

Walton Castle
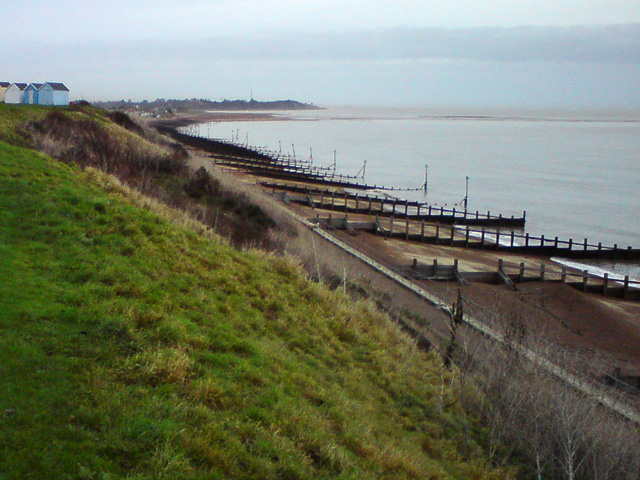
- Walton Castle stood on the cliffs at Felixstowe

- Location within Suffolk
- 51.972151°N 1.380014°E
- Type: Saxon Shore fort
- Location: Suffolk, England

Walton Castle was a Saxon Shore Fort in the Roman province of Britannia. The fort was reused by the Normans who used it as the bailey for a castle. It stood 30 metres above sea level but was destroyed by coastal erosion in the 18th century. It was located in the village of Walton, Suffolk, now part of Felixstowe (grid reference TM32253580).

== Name ==
It is uncertain if Walton Castle is one of the Saxon Shore forts listed in the 5th century Notitia Dignitatum. It has sometimes been identified with the Portus Adurni which appears in the list. In the modern era though it has become more common to identify Portus Adurni with the Saxon Shore Fort at Portchester.

== History ==
=== Roman era ===
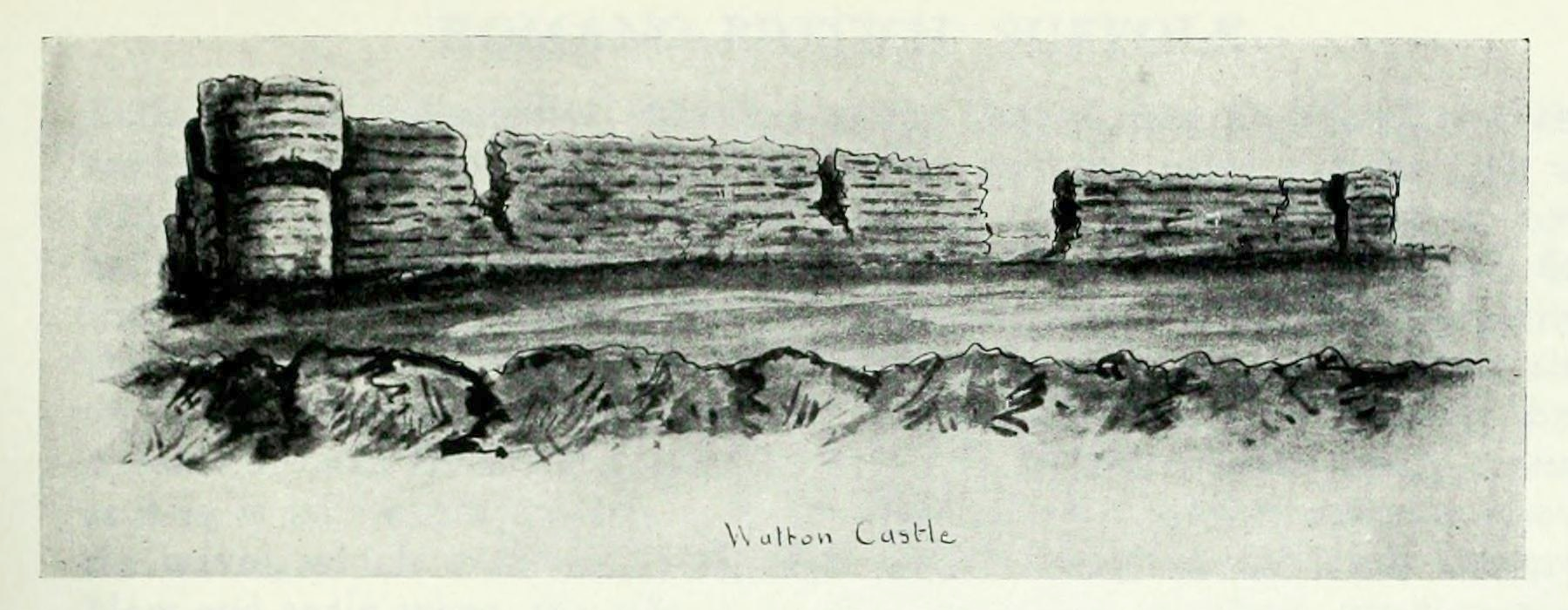
Walton Castle, drawn in 1623

Walton Castle was a Saxon Shore type fort, probably built in the late 3rd century. Much of our knowledge of the fort derives from an outline drawing and plan of 1623, as well as some 18th-century literary accounts. The 1623 drawings show a plan similar to Burgh Castle to the north. Forward projecting curvilinear towers are present at the corners of the fort. The walls have flint facing with brick bonding courses. The presence of forward-projecting towers with rounded corners is thought to be good evidence for a construction date contemporary with other Saxon Shore forts such as Burgh Castle and Othona.

In 1722 the remains were described as:

"'Tis 100 yards long, five-foot above ground, 12 broad at each end and turned with an angle. Its composed of Pepple and Roman bricks in three courses, all round footsteps of buildings, and several large pieces of Wall cast down upon the Strand by the Seas undermining ye Cliff all which have Roman brick. At low water mark very much of the like is visible some distance in the Sea. There are two entire pillars with Balls, the Cliff is 100-foot high."

In an account of 1754 the length of the west wall is given more accurately as 187 yards and it is described as being "nine feet thick".

Roman finds found in the vicinity of the fort suggest the existence of an extensive Roman settlement occupied over a long period. It was probably a vicus and a port.

There may have been a second fort on a promontory around six miles south of Walton Castle. The location, on West Rocks, is now about three miles out to sea.

=== Viking / Saxon period ===
According to Bede, a place called Dommoc often linked with Dunwich on the Suffolk coast was the seat of East Anglia's first bishop, Felix of Burgundy, in the 7th century, from whom Felixstowe takes its name. There is some evidence that Walton Castle was the location of Dommoc, where there appears to have been a church dedicated to St Felix inside the walls in the 12th century.

=== Medieval period ===
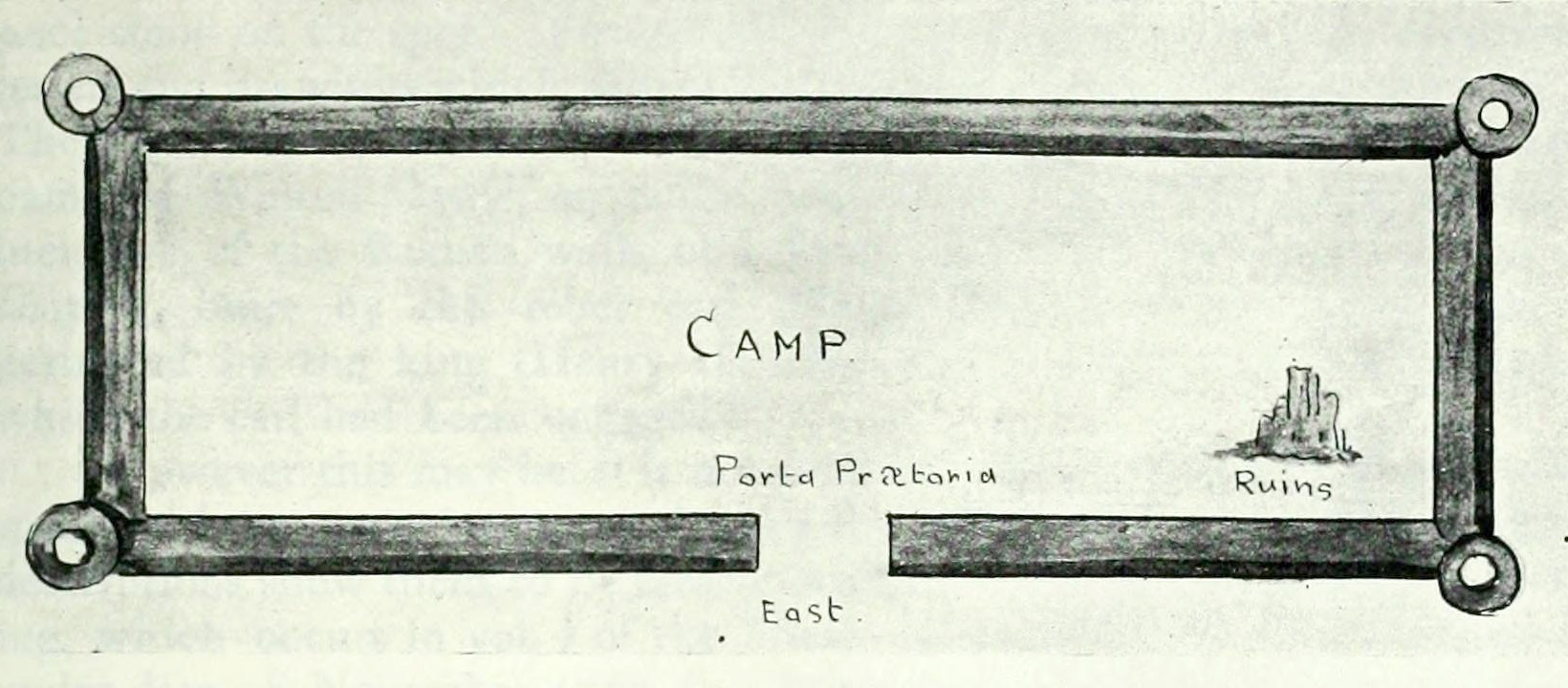
1623 plan of Walton Castle

The fort was subsequently reused by the Normans who used it as the bailey for a castle built there by one of the Bigod earls, probably Roger Bigod who died in 1107. The castle was strengthened by Hugh Bigod, Roger's son, but was confiscated and garrisoned by Henry II in the 12th century, following Hugh's involvement in the Revolt of 1173–1174. In 1175-6 the castle was dismantled (slighted) by Henry and used in the construction of Orford Castle. It was one of at least twenty cases belonging to the rebels to be slighted in the aftermath of the conflict. The walls of the Roman fort survived this demolition, and the plan of 1623 shows ruins in the northeast corner which presumably were the remains of the castle.

=== Erosion and loss to the sea ===
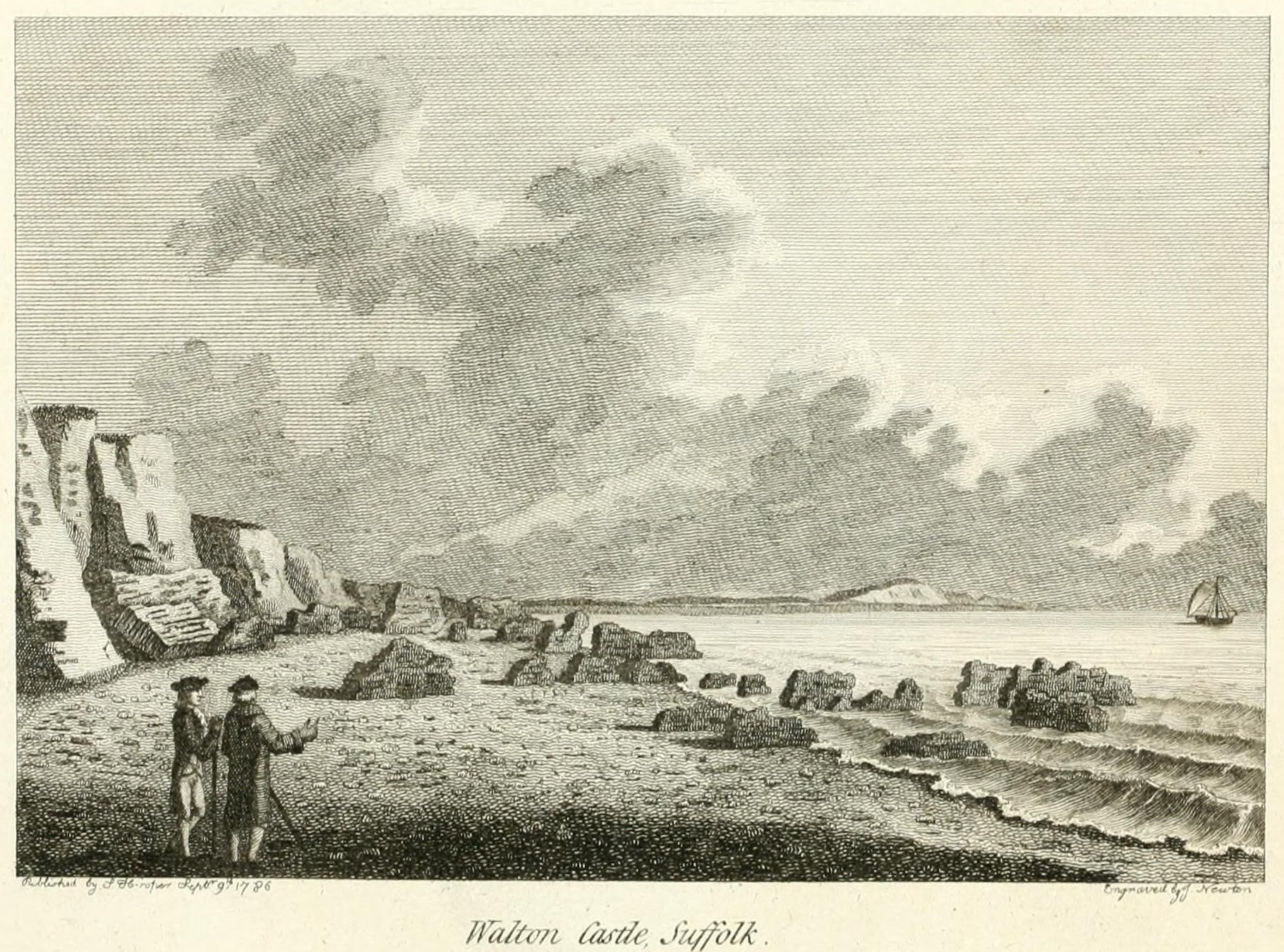
Engraving of the remains of Walton Castle on the beach, 1766, by Francis Grose.

Although the fort was still standing in 1623, it is clear by the account of 1722 that by that date at least one wall had fallen over the eroding cliff. In Kirby's Suffolk Traveller (2nd edition, 1754) it is stated that around 1740 the west wall of the fort was still standing, but that by 1754 "the Sea hath washed away the remainder of the Foundation." When Francis Grose published his The Antiquities of England and Wales in 1786, he included a picture drawn in 1766 which shows the slumped ruins of the wall lying on the beach below the cliff. He stated that it was "only visible at near low water".

Remnants of the walls can still be seen at some distance from the beach during exceptionally low tides. The ruins of the fort are visible at very low spring tides when the tidal height is less than 0.2 metres. Spring tides occur on full or no moon. In February 2024, with a tide of 0.2 metres, some ruins were visible.

== See also ==
- Landguard Fort
