= Elizabeth Chadwick =

British writer of historical fiction

- Occupation: Author
- Writing career
- Genre: Historical fiction
- Website: www.elizabethchadwick.com

Elizabeth Chadwick (born 1957) is an author of historical fiction. She is a member of Regia Anglorum, a medieval reenactment organisation.

== Biography ==
Elizabeth Chadwick was born in Bury, Lancashire, in 1957. She moved with her family to Scotland when she was four years old and spent her childhood in the village of Newton Mearns near Glasgow. She came to Nottingham when she was ten and has lived there ever since. She has told herself stories all of her life, but didn't actually write anything down until she was fifteen. Her first foray into historical fiction, a novel about the Holy Land in the twelfth century, led her to the realisation that she wanted to write historical fiction for a living.

In 1989, after Chadwick's works had been rejected by publishers for years, though they won some competitions, a literary agent became interested in her book The Wild Hunt. It was auctioned to Michael Joseph, part of Penguin Group. A year later the book won a Betty Trask Award, which was presented to the author at Whitehall by the Prince of Wales.

Elizabeth Chadwick has gone on to become one of Britain's foremost historical novelists and has been called by the Historical Novel Society "the best writer of medieval fiction currently around". She is published internationally, and her work has been translated into 16 languages. Chadwick is renowned for her extensive research into the medieval period and particularly so in the area of the Marshal and Bigod families. Her novels about the thirteenth-century magnate William Marshal, The Greatest Knight (2005) and The Scarlet Lion (2006), have brought her international acclaim.

== Works ==
=== Wild Hunt series ===
1. The Wild Hunt (1990) ISBN 0-3453-7724-9
2. The Running Vixen (1991) ISBN 0-3120-7793-9
3. The Leopard Unleashed (1993) ISBN 0-3120-9323-3
4. The Coming of the Wolf (2020)

=== The Fitzwarin novels ===
1. Shadows And Strongholds (2004)
2. Lords of the White Castle (2000)

=== William Marshal novels ===
1. The Greatest Knight (2005)
2. The Scarlet Lion (2006)
3. A Place Beyond Courage (2007)
4. For the King's Favor (2008)
5. To Defy a King (2010)
6. Templar Silks (2019)
7. The Irish Princess (2019)

=== The Bigod novels ===
1. The Time of Singing (2008) (published as For the King's Favor in the U.S.)
2. To Defy A King (2010) - book about William Marshal's eldest daughter, Maud Marshal (1192 - 1248)

=== Eleanor of Aquitaine series ===
1. The Summer Queen (2013)
2. The Winter Crown (2014)
3. The Autumn Throne (2016)

=== Largely standalone novels ===
- Children of Destiny (1994) – since retitled Daughters of the Grail
- Shields of Pride (1994)
- First Knight (1996)
- The Conquest (1996)
- The Champion (1997)
- The Love Knot (1998)
- The Marsh King's Daughter (1999)
- The Winter Mantle (2002)
- The Falcons of Montabard (2003) – connected with Winter Mantle
- A Place Beyond Courage (2007) – novel about William Marshal's father
- Lady of the English (2011) – about Adeliza of Louvain and Maude of England
- The Irish Princess (2019)

== Awards ==
- Betty Trask Award 1990 for The Wild Hunt

== Nominations ==
For the Romantic Novelists Award:

- 1998 – The Champion
- 2001 – The Lords of the White Castle
- 2002 – The Winter Mantle
- 2003 – The Falcons of Montabard
- The Scarlet Lion was nominated by Richard Lee, founder of the Historical Novel Society, as one of the top ten historical novels of the last decade.
