= Ida de Tosny =

Norman noblewoman and royal mistress

- Noble family: de Tosny
- Spouse: Roger Bigod, 2nd Earl of Norfolk
- Issue: William Longespée, 3rd Earl of Salisbury (illegitimate); Hugh Bigod, 3rd Earl of Norfolk; William Bigod; Roger Bigod; John Bigod; Ralph Bigod; Mary fitz Robert; Margery de Hastings; Ida Bigod
- Father: Ralph IV de Tosny
- Mother: Margaret de Beaumont

Ida de Tosny (or Toeny, or Tony), Countess of Norfolk (died after 1181), was a Norman royal mistress.

== Early life ==
Named after her grandmother Ida de Hainaut, Ida was the daughter of Ralph IV de Tosny (died 1162) and his wife Margaret (born c. 1125 and living in 1185), a daughter of Robert de Beaumont, 2nd Earl of Leicester.

The circumstances of Ida's early life are uncertain. She had at least eight children by Roger Bigod after 1182, so was likely born no earlier than 1150. Moreover, some sources put the date of marriage between her mother Margaret and her father Ralph at 1155 or later (which implies a date of birth between 1155 and 1162.) This, however, is difficult to reconcile with her identification as the mother of William Longespée, 3rd Earl of Salisbury, and his estimated birth date of circa 1167 (William is described as a young man in historical records in 1188–1190 and was likely of age by then.)

Despite her Norman ancestry, Ida was born and raised in Flamstead, Hertfordshire, England.

== Relationship to King Henry II ==
Ida was a royal ward and mistress of King Henry II of England, by whom she was the mother of one of his illegitimate sons, William Longespee, (d. 7 March 1226), as demonstrated by the discovery of a charter of William mentioning "Comitissa Ida, mater mea" (Countess Ida, my mother). Ida was not the first English royal ward to be taken as a royal mistress. Isabel de Beaumont (Elizabeth de Beaumont), was the ward of King Henry I and the mistress of one of his sons.

Ida was a first cousin, once removed, of another of Henry II's mistresses, Rosamund Clifford (Raoul III of Tosny was Ida's great-grandfather and Rosamund's grandfather.)

== Marriage ==
Around Christmas 1181, Ida was given by Henry II in marriage to Roger Bigod, 2nd Earl of Norfolk, together with the manors of Acle, Halvergate and South Walsham, which had been confiscated from Roger's inheritance after the death of his father Hugh Bigod, 1st Earl of Norfolk. Ida and Roger had a number of children, including:

- Hugh Bigod, 3rd Earl of Norfolk, who in 1206 or 1207 married Maud Marshal, a daughter of William Marshal
- William Bigod
- Roger Bigod
- John Bigod
- Ralph Bigod
- Mary Bigod, who married Ralph fitz Robert
- Margery Bigod, who married William de Hastings
- Ida Bigod

Many historians have speculated that the couple had a third daughter, Alice, who married Aubrey de Vere IV, 2nd Earl of Oxford, as his second wife.

== Sources ==
- Morris, Marc (2005). The Bigod Earls of Norfolk in the Thirteenth Century. Boydell Press.
- Strickland, Matthew (2016). Henry the Young King, 1155–1183. Yale University Press.
- van Houts, Elisabeth (2019). Married Life in the Middle Ages, 900–1300. Oxford University Press.
