= Walton, Suffolk =

Former civil parish in Suffolk, England

Coordinates: 51°58′18″N 1°20′25″E

Walton
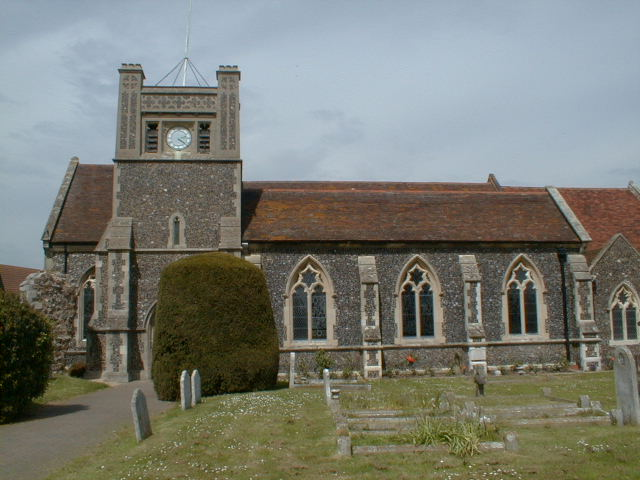
- Walton Church

- Location within Suffolk
- Civil parish: Felixstowe
- District: East Suffolk
- Shire county: Suffolk
- Region: East
- Country: England
- Sovereign state: United Kingdom
- Post town: FELIXSTOWE
- Postcode district: IP11
- Dialling code: 01394
- Police: Suffolk
- Fire: Suffolk
- Ambulance: East of England
- UK Parliament: Suffolk Coastal

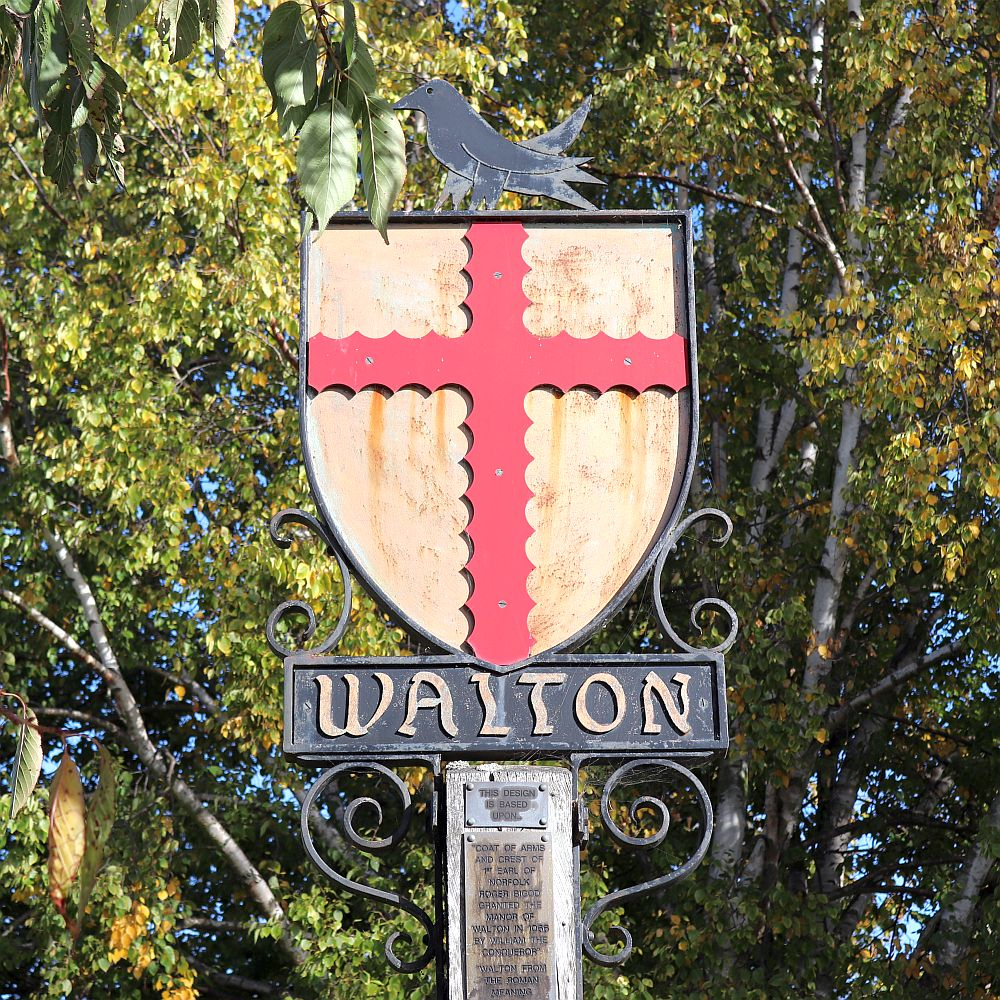
Walton Village Sign - The sign was given to the village by 'Walton carnival Funtime' in June 1993. The sign is based upon the coat of arms and crest of the 1st Earl of Norfolk, Roger Bigod who was granted the Manor of Walton in 1066 by William the Conqueror. The sign is positioned next to the church.

Walton is a settlement and former civil parish, now in the parish of Felixstowe, in the East Suffolk district, in the county of Suffolk, England, lying between the rivers Orwell and Deben.

== History ==
There is archaeological evidence of Bronze Age field systems near Walton Hall. A Late Bronze Age hoard comprising a Type 4 barbed spearhead and a south-eastern type socketed axe was found in the first railway cutting to the west of the Lilds site in the 19th century (FEX 010). A Roman coin of Antoninus pius (AD 157–8)was discovered just to the west of the Lidls site (FEX 029). Later, a Roman fort, Walton Castle, enclosing about 6 acres (2.4 ha), similar to Burgh Castle, stood on high land near Brackenbury Fort and Bull's Cliff, now in Felixstowe. Probably built in the third or fourth centuries AD, it formed part of the coastal defences of the eastern shore of Britain, and overlooked the mouth of the River Deben. The walls and foundations subsided in cliff erosion during the 18th century, but large portions of the walls still lie under the sea. There is evidence of a Roman port around Walton castle and 'The Dip', as well as a Roman villa and precinct.

The name Walton denotes a settlement and farmstead of Wealas, ("strangers") the Anglo-Saxon term for native Britons, or Celts who, over time, adopted the language and culture of the newcomers.

During the early seventh century, when the Anglo-Saxon royal cemetery at Sutton Hoo was in use, Walton Castle was an important part of the royal environs which, by c. 660, had become settled at Rendlesham, on the north side of the River Deben. With Dunwich, Walton Castle is one of the two principal sites claimed in the Middle Ages for the location of Dommoc, the original bishop's seat of St Felix (Felix of Burgundy), first bishop of the East Angles, who arrived c. 630 AD in the reign of King Sigeberht of East Anglia. The see of Dommoc survived until the late ninth century.

At the time of the Norman Conquest, the manor of Walton was linked with that of Falkenham, a village overlooking the River Deben a little further inland. The fort area was then known as Burch, a form of Burgh. In about 1170–80 Roger Bigod, 1st Earl of Norfolk, invited the monks of Rochester to found Walton Priory, dedicated to St Felix, in the precinct of the Roman fort.

During the twelfth century, the powerful Bigod family established an important manorial hall at Walton, which was successively rebuilt and enlarged over the next two centuries using material from the old castle and Caen stone from Normandy for ornamental windows and doors. Hugh Bigod also held a castle at Walton, but was obliged to surrender it to King Henry II in 1157. Henry then stationed a royal garrison there until 1173, when the rebel Earl of Leicester landed there to join the Bigods. The Bigod castle, according to the chronicler Diceto, had a high tower set up with very strong walls. Henry ordered its demolition in 1178. King John was staying at Walton Hall in 1200 when he ratified the original Town Charter of Ipswich. Large ruins of the old hall remained in the eighteenth century, and the last major portion of wall fell during a high storm in the 1880s. It stood near the Felixstowe cricket ground on Dellwood Avenue.

During the thirteenth century, the place name Felixstowe first appears, which replaced that of Burch and became the name of the large settlement which has now largely engulfed the older Walton. In around 1317, probably because the Roman precinct was threatened by sea erosion, it became necessary to relocate Walton Priory to Abbey Meadow, behind the Walton parish church of St Mary. The parish church was then used as the conventual or priory church. The ruins of the second priory were still standing in the late 18th century, and the site was excavated by Dr Stanley West in around 1970. The parish church was largely rebuilt in the 19th century on the medieval ground-plan, including the tower unusually sited at the south-west end of the south aisle. It is a grade II* listed building.

The various Roman and medieval ruins of Walton were variously sketched and painted during the 18th century by Francis Grose, Isaac Johnson and others. The reference to a cross at Walton carved with the date 631, observed in the 18th century, is to the old wooden market cross of Walton, a covered structure which was inscribed with the date 1631.

In 1870–72, John Marius Wilson's Imperial Gazetteer of England and Wales said of Walton: "WALTON, a parish, with a village, in Woodbridge district, Suffolk; 3½ miles NW [NE?] of Harwich r. station. It has a post-office‡. under Ipswich, and a ferry across the Orwell to Harwich. Acres, 1,988. Real property, £5,663. Pop., 988. Houses, 225. The manor belongs to the Duke of Hamilton. Orwell House and Coldham are chief residences. W. Castle stood on a sea-cliff; dated from the time of the Romans; was rebuilt by R. Bigod, and ruined by Henry II.; and suffered gradual undermining and eventual extinction by the sea."

In 1911 the parish had a population of 4226. On 1 April 1914 the parish was abolished and merged with Felixstowe.

== Walton smock mill ==
High street, Walton TM 2935 NW (south side) Smock mill, disused. Early C19. Brick base, partly rendered, timber framed and weatherboarded upper section. Octagonal tower, two storeys brick, two storeys timber framed. Doorway with boarded door, window of six small panes above. Cap replaced by hexagonal pointed corrugated iron roof. Internal machinery removed.

== Fidells Cross ==
1539 Walton Court Rolls, or Viduloius Cross, 1554 Priory Customal. It is believed to have stood on the parish boundary at the junction of Spriteshall Lane with High Street.

== Town jail ==
The town jail which still stands in front of the church originally stood in the mouth of Cage Lane opposite the church. It was converted into a cage or lock-up for prisoners in 1795–6.

== The Round House ==
The Round House is Grade II listed and is located on the north side of the High Street. The building is early nineteenth century in date, built c.1800–32, is a timber framed hexagonal structure and is shown on the tithe map of 1840

== Walton Hall ==
Walton Hall was built in c.1740–1750 and rebuilt and extended in c.1799 as evidenced by a date stone which is initialled for the contemporary owner Anthony Collett. The building has been known as Walton Hall from c.1813 when the original manorial complex which lay in Walton Village to the east was demolished. The building is set back from the High Street, towards which the front elevation faces

== Walton North ==
Plans for new housing behind the Round House, and Walton Hall were proposed in the early 21st century. Plans for a further 385 homes opposite Felixstowe Academy have been put forward despite public protest as well as the 190 already nearing completion adjacent to the Academy as of 2018.

== Sources ==
- J. Fairclough and S. J. Plunkett, 2000, 'Drawings of Walton Castle and other monuments in Walton and Felixstowe', Proc. Suffolk Institute of Archaeology and History 39 Part 4, p. 419-459.
- J. Fairclough, 2008, 'Bigods at Walton Hall and their Successors,' Proc. Suffolk Institute of Archaeology and History 41 Part 4, p.405-425.
- S.E. West, 1974, The Excavation of Walton Priory, Proc. Suffolk Institute of Archaeology and History 33, p.131-152.
- The Victoria history of the county of Suffolk, volume one The Victoria history of the counties of England Page(s)305-6
- The Suffolk Traveller John Kirby (topographer) (1690–1753)
