= William de Hastings =

12th-13th century English noble

William de Hastings (died 1225), was an English soldier and noble.

He was the second son of William Hastings and Maud Banastre. William was part of the baronial opposition during the First Barons' War, against King John of England. His lands were forfeited in 1216 and he was taken prisoner at the Battle of Lincoln in 1217 against Henry III of England. William supported William de Forz, Earl of Albemarle at the siege of Bytham in 1221.

== Marriage and issue ==
William married Margery, daughter of Roger Bigod, Earl of Norfolk and Ida de Tosny, who are known to have had the following known issue:

- Henry de Hastings (died 1250), married Ada of Huntingdon, had issue.
- Maud de Hastings, married Gilbert de Pecche.
- Ida de Hastings, married firstly Stephen de Segrave and secondly Hugh Pecche.
