= Stephen de Segrave =

English justice and administrator

Sir Stephen de Segrave
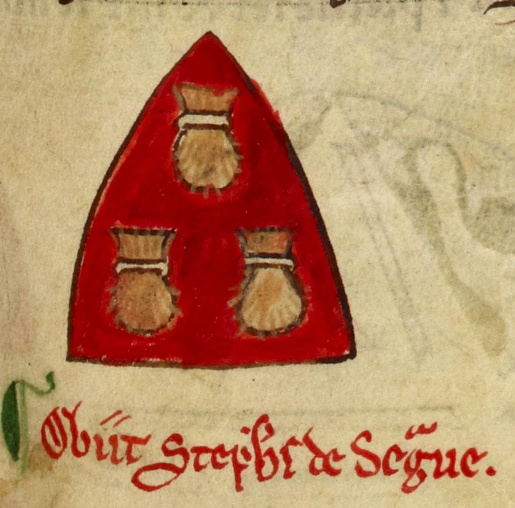
- Inverted shield with the arms of Stephan de Segrave

Chief Justiciar of England
- In office 1232–1234
- Monarch: Henry III
- Preceded by: Hubert de Burgh, 1st Earl of Kent
- Succeeded by: vacant until 1258; Hugh Bigod

Personal details
- Born: c. 1171
- Died: 9 November 1241
- Spouse(s): Rohese le Despenser, Ida de Hastings
- Relations: Nicholas Segrave, 1st Baron Segrave (grandson)
- Children: Sir Gilbert de Segrave II (1202-1254); Stephen de Segrave (1204-1229); Eleonor de Segrave (1206); John de Segrave (1207-1230)
- Parent: Gilbert de Segrave (father)

Stephen de Segrave (or Seagrove or Stephen Segrave or Stephen of Seagrave) (c. 1171 – 9 November 1241) was a medieval Chief Justiciar of England.

== Life ==
He was born as the son of a certain Gilbert de Segrave of Segrave in Leicestershire, who had been High Sheriff of Warwickshire and Leicestershire in 1193.

Stephen became a knight and was made constable of the Tower of London in 1220. He obtained lands and held various positions under Henry III. From 1221 to 1223 he served as High Sheriff of Hertfordshire and Essex, from 1222 to 1224 as High Sheriff of Lincolnshire, from 1228 to 1234 as High Sheriff of Bedfordshire and Buckinghamshire and from 1229 to 1234 as High Sheriff of Warwickshire, Leicestershire and Northamptonshire. In 1236, he became castellan of Beeston Castle and Chester Castle, jointly with Hugh de Spencer and Henry de Aldithley.

He was given the manor where Caludon Castle was built, at Wyken near Coventry in 1232 or earlier, by Ranulph de Blondeville, 4th Earl of Chester. Ranulph also granted him Bretby in 1209.

In 1232, he succeeded Hubert de Burgh as chief justiciar of England. He officiated at the trial of de Burgh, in November 1232, which has been called the "first state trial" in England. As an active coadjutor of Peter des Roches, bishop of Winchester, Segrave incurred some share of the opprobrium which was lavished on the Poitevin royal favourites of Henry III of England. In 1234, he was deprived of his office as Justiciar. Soon, however, he was again occupying an influential position at Henry's court, and he retained this until his death.

However, uncertain about his personal safety, he became a canon at Leicester Abbey, where he died on 9 November 1241, and was buried.

== Family ==
He married twice; firstly to Rohese le Despencer, daughter of Thomas Despenser, who bore him three sons and a daughter, and secondly to Ida de Hastings, daughter of William de Hastings and Margery Bigod of Norfolk. Gilbert died at Pons in the Prerogative County of Poitiers (Comte apanage de Poitiers (de Poitou)), in the province of Saintonge, in a region controlled by the Kingdom of France, on 8 October 1254, following his capture during a campaign in Gascony.

Issue from marriage to Rohese le Despencer:

- Sir Gilbert de Segrave II (1202 - 1254): Husband of Amabilia de Chaucombe, Lady Segrave. Father of Alice de Segrave, Margaret de Vere and Nicholas de Segrave, 1st Baron Segrave.
- Stephen de Segrave (1204 - 1229)
- Eleonor de Segrave (1206): Wife of Robert Hovell.
- John de Segrave (1207 - 1230): Husband of Emma de Cauz.

His grandson Nicholas was 1st Baron Segrave, a peerage now united with Baron Mowbray.

== Notes ==
Political offices
Preceded by Hubert de Burgh	Chief Justiciar; 1232–1234	Succeeded by office vacant until 1258 (Hugh Bigod)
Preceded by Walter of Pattishall	High Sheriff of Bedfordshire and Buckinghamshire; 1228–1234	Succeeded by Ralph Fitz Reginald
