= Hugh Bigod, 1st Earl of Norfolk =

English nobleman (1095–1177)

Hugh Bigod
- 1st Earl of Norfolk
- Tenure: 1141–1177
- Successor: Roger Bigod, 2nd Earl of Norfolk
- Born: 1095; Belvoir Castle
- Died: before 9 March 1177 (aged c. 82); Palestine
- Wars and battles: The Anarchy
- Offices: Constable of Norwich Castle
- Spouses: Juliane de Vere; Gundreda de Beaumont
- Issue: Roger Bigod, 2nd Earl of Norfolk; Hugh Bigod; William Hugh Bigod
- Parents: Roger Bigod; Adeliza de Tosny

Hugh Bigod, 1st Earl of Norfolk (1095–1177) was the second son of Roger Bigod (also known as Roger Bigot) (died 1107), sheriff of Norfolk and royal advisor, and Adeliza, daughter of Robert de Todeni.

== Early years ==
After the death of his elder brother William, who perished without issue in the sinking of the White Ship on 25 November 1120, Hugh was allowed to inherit his brother's office of royal steward and many estates in East Anglia. He also succeeded his aunt Albreda, heiress of her brother Berengar de Tosny, with lands in Yorkshire, including Kirkstall Abbey, and in Normandy. Hugh became Constable of Norwich Castle in 1122.

== During King Stephen's reign ==
Hugh initially supported Stephen of Blois as king of England. On the death of Henry I in 1135, his nephew Stephen usurped the throne, despite the oath Stephen and the barons had sworn to accept Henry's daughter Empress Matilda as his successor. It was Bigod who asserted that, in his last days, Henry I had named Stephen to become king at the expense of his daughter Matilda. Civil war resulted when, in 1139, Matilda commanded the military strength necessary to challenge Stephen within his own realm.

King Stephen initially had the support of the English barons, but in 1136 he was stricken with sickness and a report of his death was quickly spread abroad. Hugh Bigod seized and held Norwich castle. Stephen, quickly recovering, laid siege to the city and Hugh was compelled to surrender. In February 1141 Bigod fought on Stephen's side in the First Battle of Lincoln, after which the Earl deserted the captured king. In July of that year, he was granted the earldom of Norfolk by the Empress Matilda but he appears to have assumed a position of armed neutrality during the civil war, rather than actively siding with the supporters of the empress.

As Earl of Norfolk, Bigod's landholdings included Castle Acre, Geldeston and Hethel as well as land at Earl Soham, Framlingham, and Thetford

He supported his first wife's brother-in-law, Geoffrey de Mandeville, 1st Earl of Essex, during his rebellion against King Stephen in 1143–44. During the disagreement between King Stephen and Archbishop Theobald in 1148, Hugh Bigod sided with the archbishop and received him in his stronghold, his Castle of Framlingham, but joined with others in negotiating a reconciliation between the king and the archbishop.

== Rise of King Henry II ==
Five years later, in 1153, when Henry, Duke of Normandy, soon to become King Henry II (r. 1154–89), landed in England to assert his claim to the throne, Bigod held out in Ipswich against Stephen's forces, while Henry II, on the other side, laid siege to Stamford. Both places fell to Stephen. In the critical state of his fortunes, however, Stephen was in no position to punish the rebel earl. Negotiations between the two parties resulted in Henry's recognition as Stephen's heir and Hugh eluded retaliation.

On Henry II's accession in December 1154, Bigod received confirmation of the possession of his earldom and office of royal steward by a charter issued apparently in January of the next year. The first years of the new reign were spent in restoring order to the shattered kingdom and in breaking the power of the independent barons, which had grown out of control during King Stephen's reign.

It was not long before Bigod became agitated under the rule of law initiated by Henry. He grew restless with measures such as the scutage, a fee paid by vassals in lieu of military service, which became the central feature of Henry II's military system of operation by 1159. The Earl showed signs of resistance but was at once put down. In 1157 Henry II marched into the eastern counties and received the earl's submission.

After this incident Hugh Bigod makes no significant appearances in the chronicles for some time; he is named among those who had been excommunicated by Becket, in consequence of his retention of lands belonging to the monastery of Pentney in Norfolk.

== The revolt of 1173 ==
In 1173 the young Crown Prince Henry (also known as Henry the Young King) raised a revolt against his father Henry II. This gave Hugh Bigod a fresh occasion for rebellion, with the English barons and the kings of France and Scotland leagued in his favour. He at once became a leader in the cause, being eager to revive his feudal power which Henry II had curtailed, and because the conflict which inevitably resulted was, at least in England, centred upon his own territorial possessions. The custody of Norwich Castle was promised by the young prince as his reward.

The king's energy and good fortune were equal to the occasion. While he held in check his rebel vassals in France, the loyal barons in England defeated his enemies there. Robert de Beaumont, 3rd Earl of Leicester (died 1190) landed at Walton, in Suffolk, on 29 September 1173 and marched to Framlingham, joining forces with Hugh. Together they besieged and took the castle of Hagenet in Suffolk on 13 October, held by Randal de Broc for the crown. But the Earl of Leicester was defeated and taken prisoner setting out from Framlingham at the Battle of Fornham, near Bury St Edmunds, Suffolk, by the justiciar Richard de Luci and other barons. These then turned their arms against Earl Hugh, who, not being strong enough to fight, opened negotiations with his assailants. It is said he bought them off, and at the same time secured a safe passage home for the Flemings in his service.

== Final days ==
Though defeated and compelled to surrender his castles, Bigod kept his lands and his earldom, and lived at peace with Henry II until his death reportedly in 1177 in Palestine.

On 1 March 1177, his son Roger Bigod appealed to the king on a dispute with his stepmother. Hugh was dead at the time of Roger's appeal, the date of his father's death is fixed 'ante caput jejunii', (i.e. before 9 March). If, then, he died in Palestine, his death must have taken place in the preceding year, 1176, to allow time for the arrival of the news in England. Henry II took advantage of Roger's appeal to seize upon the late Earl's treasure. Earl Hugh had possessed vast estates, which he inherited, and was also the recipient of the third penny of judicial fines levied in the county of Norfolk by right of his earldom.

== Marriage and family ==
Bigod married firstly to Juliane de Vere (died c. 1199). She was the daughter of Aubrey de Vere II and Adeliza de Clare, the daughter of Gilbert Fitz Richard de Clare, 2nd Earl of Clare. The marriage was dissolved before 1156. They had one son:

- Roger Bigod, 2nd Earl of Norfolk (born c. 1144–5). He married Ida de Tosny, had issue.

Bigod married secondly Gundreda de Beaumont (c. 1135–1200), daughter of Roger de Beaumont, 2nd Earl of Warwick. They had two children:

- Hugh Bigod (born c. 1156)
- William Hugh Bigod (born 1168)

Peerage of England
New creation	Earl of Norfolk; 1141–1177	Succeeded by Roger Bigod
