= Hugh Bigod (Justiciar) =

Justiciar of England from 1258 to 1260

Chief Justiciar of England
- In office 1258–1260
- Monarch: Henry III
- Preceded by: (Stephen de Segrave) Vacant from 1234
- Succeeded by: Hugh le Despencer

Personal details
- Born: c. 1211
- Died: before 7 May 1266
- Party: Barons
- Spouse: Joan de Stuteville
- Children: 8, including Roger le Bigod
- Parent(s): Hugh Bigod, 3rd Earl of Norfolk; Maud Marshal

Hugh Bigod (c. 1211 – 1266) was Justiciar of England from 1258 to 1260. He was a younger son of Hugh Bigod, 3rd Earl of Norfolk.

In 1258 the Provisions of Oxford established a baronial government of which Hugh's elder brother Roger Bigod, 4th Earl of Norfolk was a leading member, and Hugh was appointed Chief Justiciar. He also had wardship of the Tower of London, and, briefly, of Dover Castle. But at the end of 1260 or in early 1261 he resigned these offices, apparently due to dissatisfaction with the new government. Thus in 1263 he joined the royalists, and was present on that side at the Battle of Lewes. That battle took place by a village called Fletching, north of Lewes. Hugh escaped but the King and his son, Prince Edward, were taken prisoner.

== Marriage and issue ==
Bigod married, before 5 February 1244, Joan de Stuteville (d. before 6 April 1276), widow of Hugh Wake of Bourne, Lincolnshire, and daughter and heiress of Nicholas de Stuteville by Dervorguille, daughter of Roland Fitz Uchtred, Lord of Galloway, by whom he had four sons and four daughters:

- Roger Bigod, 5th Earl of Norfolk, who married firstly Aline Basset, and secondly Alice of Hainault, but had no issue by either marriage.
- Ralph Bigod.
- John Bigod, a cleric, who was heir to his elder brother, Roger.
- Richard Bigod.
- Elizabeth Bigod.
- Rohese Bigod.
- Maud Bigod.
- Joan Bigod, who married Sir Philip de Kyme.

There is no contemporary evidence for the assertion, first recorded in the seventeenth century, that Bigod had an earlier wife called Joanna Burnard (or Burnet or Burnell); if indeed a Hugh Bigod married Joanna, it probably was his father that did so.

== Notes ==
Political offices
| Preceded by Vacant from 1234 (Stephen de Segrave) | Chief Justiciar; 1258–1260 | Succeeded by Hugh le Despencer |
| Preceded by Richard de Grey | Lord Warden of the Cinque Ports; 1259–1260 | Succeeded by Nicholas de Crioll |
