= Roger Bigod, 4th Earl of Norfolk =

Marshal of England

Arms of Bigod (dropped post-1269 by Roger Bigod, 5th Earl of Norfolk): Or, a cross gules

Roger Bigod (c. 1209–1270) was 4th Earl of Norfolk and Marshal of England.

== Origins ==
He was the eldest son and heir of Hugh Bigod, 3rd Earl of Norfolk (1182–1225) by his wife Maud Marshal, a daughter of William Marshal, 1st Earl of Pembroke (1147–1219), Marshal of England. His younger brother was Hugh Bigod (1211–1266), Justiciar. After the death of his father in 1225, the young Roger became the ward of William Longespée, 3rd Earl of Salisbury.

== Career ==
In 1228, although still under-age but by now married and in a second wardship to Alexander II of Scotland following his 1225 marriage to Alexander's sister Isabella, he succeeded to his father's estates including Framlingham Castle after his unexpected death in 1225. However, the earldom was only granted to him by Henry III in 1233.

Roger was already a wealthy magnate, but in 1248 he received vast lands in south Wales and Ireland on the death of his mother. Through his mother, Roger had gained the hereditary title of Marshal of England, one of the most influential royal offices of medieval England, in 1246.

Responsible for keeping order around the king, in peacetime the marshal performed a ceremonial and judicial role, with lucrative rights, such as securing gifts from newly created knights. During wartime, the marshal was responsible for the discipline of the army.

Roger attended Henry III's Court and even hosted the king at Framlingham, but tensions arose over the repayment of debts to the king, as well as growing criticism of the royal government.

In 1255, the chronicler Matthew Paris reported an exchange between the two men. When Henry called Roger a traitor, the earl replied, "You lie. I have never been a traitor, nor shall I ever be. If you are just, how can you harm me." "I can seize your corn and thresh it, and sell it," retorted the king. "Do so," said Roger, "and I will send back your threshers without their heads."

In 1258, Roger was at the head of a rebel group of barons and knights who marched on Westminster Hall, compelling the king to accept major constitutional reforms, known as the Provisions of Oxford. Despite having other property around the country, Roger always retained his strong East Anglian loyalties. He died in 1270 and was buried, like his forefathers, at Thetford Priory.

== Marriage ==
His first warder married him to Isabella of Scotland, daughter of William the Lion, King of Scotland, whereupon still under-age, he became a ward of his new brother-in-law, Alexander II of Scotland until 1228.

== Succession ==
Roger had no children, and was succeeded by his nephew Roger Bigod, 5th Earl of Norfolk (1245–1306).

== Notes ==
Political offices
Preceded by The Earl of Pembroke	Lord Marshal; 1245–1269	Succeeded by The Earl of Norfolk
Peerage of England
Preceded by Hugh Bigod	Earl of Norfolk; 1225–1270	Succeeded by Roger Bigod
