= William Bigod =

Anglo-Norman heir, killed in the White Ship disaster

William Bigod (died 25 November 1120), the heir to the Norfolk earldom, drowned in the disaster of the White Ship as she set sail from Normandy in 1120. The ship also carried the son and heir apparent of the King of England Henry I, William Adelin, who also died. The succession of Henry I to the throne of England was secured not only by the mysterious death of his brother King William II Rufus but by the defeat of his eldest brother Robert Curthose, Duke of Normandy. The death of Henry's heir to the throne and his own death 15 years later set off a succession crisis and a period of civil war in England known as the Anarchy (1135–1153).

It was said that the crew and passengers had been drinking, whether by perfidy or incompetence, and thus the vessel and all those shining dreams of the English Romanesque were lost. Duke William of Normandy, in becoming King of England, introduced with great vigour the architecture of European society. Probably William was the name given to the Bigod heir to honour his family's relationship to William the Conqueror.

Norman ties were broken on the ascendancy of Anjou to the English throne. William Bigod's father, Roger Bigod of Norfolk, the 1st Bigod Earl, Ralph de Breuilon (de Breton) was the 1st Earl of the Conquest. Ralph de Breton had made a marriage contract between Norfolk and Hereford, without the King's consent. A civil war ensued which resulted in the Earldom of Norfolk being given to Roger, William Bigod's father. Roger had been an unknown hearth-knight to the Bishop of Bayeux. We do not see Roger mentioned at the Conquest. He was Sheriff of Suffolk from 1116.

William commissioned the church at South Lopham, considered one of the finest examples of Norman architecture in Norfolk. William's younger brother Hugh succeeded to the Earldom. Arthur Mee states that Earl Hugh is stained with blood of the subsequent civil war, The Anarchy, which occurred between King Stephen and the Empress Matilda (or rather the Countess of Anjou and Normandy and daughter of Henry I). This arose as Earl Hugh was present at death of King Henry, and it was he who declared the King's change of will. There are many factors to question the accuracy of this, but certainly Earl Hugh was the scapegoat for a situation, in truth, engineered by the thoughtless ambitions of King Henry I in so marrying his daughter to Geoffrey Plantagenet, Count of Anjou, the natural enemy of the Norman aristocracy.

== Sources ==
Mee, Arthur, Norfolk (King's England), Hodder and Stoughton, 1940
