= Maud Marshal =

Anglo-Norman noblewoman

- Countess of Norfolk; Countess of Surrey
- Born: 1192
- Died: 27 March 1248 (aged 55–56)
- Noble family: Marshal
- Spouses: Hugh Bigod, 3rd Earl of Norfolk; William de Warenne, 5th Earl of Surrey
- Issue: Roger Bigod, 4th Earl of Norfolk; Hugh Bigod; Isabel Bigod; Ralph Bigod; William Bigod; John de Warenne, 6th Earl of Surrey; Isabella de Warenne
- Father: William Marshal, 1st Earl of Pembroke
- Mother: Isabel de Clare, suo jure 4th Countess of Pembroke

Maud Marshal, Countess of Norfolk, Countess of Surrey (1192 – 27 March 1248) was an Anglo-Norman noblewoman and a wealthy co-heiress of her father William Marshal, 1st Earl of Pembroke, and her mother Isabel de Clare suo jure 4th Countess of Pembroke. Also known as Matilda Marshal, Maud was the eldest daughter of the Marshal family. She had two husbands: Hugh Bigod, 3rd Earl of Norfolk, and William de Warenne, 5th Earl of Surrey.

== Family ==
Maud's exact birthdate is unknown, but at the latest she was born in the year 1192. She was the eldest daughter of William Marshal, 1st Earl of Pembroke and Isabel de Clare, 4th Countess of Pembroke, herself one of the greatest heiresses in Wales and Ireland.

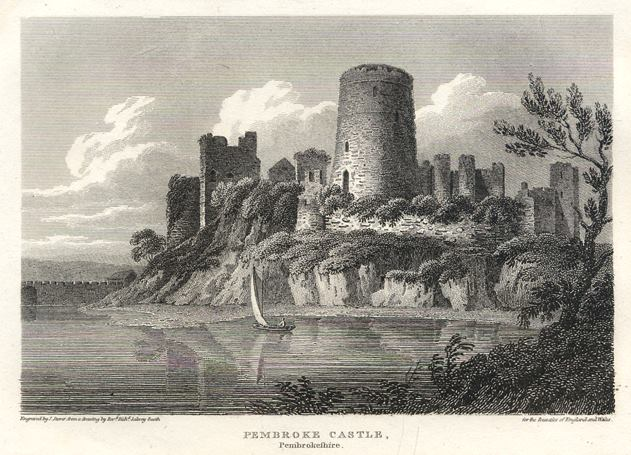
Print depicting Pembroke Castle

She was a member of the Marshal Family. Maud had five brothers and four younger sisters and lived the longest out of her siblings. She was a co-heiress to her parents' extensive rich estates.

Maud's paternal grandparents were John FitzGilbert Marshal and Sybilla of Salisbury, and her maternal grandparents were Richard de Clare, 2nd Earl of Pembroke, known as "Strongbow", and Aoife of Leinster, Princess of Leinster and Countess of Pembroke.

== Marriages and issue ==
Sometime before Lent in 1207, Maud married her first husband, Hugh Bigod, 3rd Earl of Norfolk. It was through this marriage between Maud and Hugh that the post of Earl Marshal of England came finally to the Howard Dukes of Norfolk. In 1215, Hugh was one of the twenty-five sureties of Magna Carta. He came into his inheritance in 1221, thus Maud became the Countess of Norfolk at that time.

Together Maud and Bigod had the following children:

- Roger Bigod, 4th Earl of Norfolk (1209–1270)
- Hugh Bigod (1212–1266), Justiciar of England.
- Isabel Bigod (c. 1215–1250), married firstly Gilbert de Lacy of Ewyas Lacy, by whom she had issue; and secondly John Fitzgeoffrey, Lord of Shere, by whom she had issue.
- Ralph Bigod (born c. 1218, date of death unknown), married Bertha de Furnival, by whom he had one child.

Bigod died in 1225. One of Maud's first acts as a widow was to transfer some Bigod lands to her son Roger.

Maud married her second husband, William de Warenne, 5th Earl of Surrey before 13 October that same year.

Together Maud and Warenne had two children:

- Isabella de Warenne (c. 1228 – before 20 September 1282), married Hugh d'Aubigny, 5th Earl of Arundel.
- John de Warenne, 6th Earl of Surrey (August 1231 – c. 29 September 1304)

Maud's second husband died in 1240 and she became a wealthy double dowager, with dower rights accrued from both of her marriages.

Maud's youngest son John succeeded his father as the 6th Earl of Surrey, but as he was a minor, Peter of Savoy, uncle of Queen consort Eleanor of Provence, was guardian of his estates.

== Death ==
Maud died on 27 March 1248 at the age of about fifty-six years and was buried at Tintern Abbey with her mother, possibly her maternal grandmother, and two of her brothers Walter and Anselm.

== Ancestors ==
Ancestors of Maud Marshal

8. Gilbert
4. John FitzGilbert
9. Margaret
2. William Marshal, 1st Earl of Pembroke
10. Walter of Salisbury
5. Sybilla of Salisbury
22. Patrick de Chaworth
11. Sybilla de Chaworth
23. Maud Hesdin
1. Lady Maud Marshal
24. Gilbert FitzRichard, Lord of Clare
12. Gilbert de Clare, 1st Earl of Pembroke
25. Adeliza de Clermont-en-Beauvaisis
6. Richard de Clare, 2nd Earl of Pembroke
26. Robert de Beaumont, 1st Earl of Leicester
13. Isabel de Beaumont
27. Élisabeth de Vermandois
3. Isabel de Clare, 4th Countess of Pembroke
28.Donnchadh mac Murchada, King of Leinster
14. Diarmait, King of Leinster
29 Orlaith ingen O'Braenain
7. Aoife MacMurrough, Princess of Leinster
30. Muirchertach Ua Tuathail
15. Mór Ní Tuathail
31. Cacht Ní Morda
