= Roger Bigod of Norfolk =

Norman knight (died 1107)

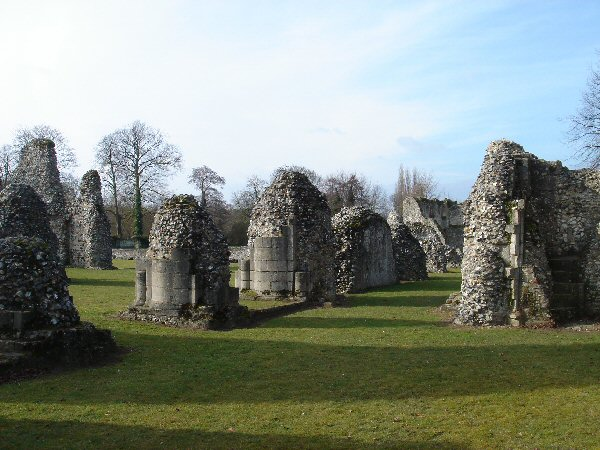
Ruins of Thetford Priory

Roger Bigod (died 1107) was a Norman knight who travelled to England in the Norman Conquest. He held great power in East Anglia, and five of his descendants were earls of Norfolk. He was also known as Roger Bigot, appearing as such as a witness to the Charter of Liberties of Henry I of England.

Bigod came from a fairly obscure family of poor knights in Normandy. Robert le Bigot, certainly a relation of Roger's, possibly his father, acquired an important position in the household of William, Duke of Normandy (later William I of England), due, the story goes, to his disclosure to the duke of a plot by the duke's cousin William Werlenc.

Both Roger and Robert were rewarded with a substantial estate in East Anglia following the Norman Conquest of England. The Domesday Book of 1086 lists Roger as holding six lordships in Essex, 117 in Suffolk and 187 in Norfolk.

Bigod's base was in Thetford, Norfolk, then the seat of the bishop, where he founded a priory which was later given to the abbey at Cluny. In 1101 he further consolidated his power when Henry I granted him licence to build a castle at Framlingham, which became the family seat of power until their downfall in 1307. Another of his castles was Bungay Castle, also in Suffolk.

In 1069 Bigod, Robert Malet and Ralph de Gael (then Earl of Norfolk), defeated the Danish king Sweyn Estrithson's invasion attempt near Ipswich. After de Gael's fall in 1074, Bigod was appointed sheriff of Norfolk and Suffolk and acquired many of the dispossessed earl's estates. For this reason he is sometimes counted as Earl of Norfolk, but he probably was never actually created earl. (His son Hugh acquired the title earl of Norfolk in 1141.) He acquired further estates through his influence in local law courts as sheriff and great lord of the region.

In the Rebellion of 1088, Bigod joined other barons in England against William II, whom they hoped to depose in favour of Robert Curthose, Duke of Normandy. He seems to have lost his lands after the rebellion had failed but regained them after reconciling with the king.

In 1100, Bigod (as Roger Bigot) was one of the witnesses recorded on the Charter of Liberties, King Henry I's coronation promises later to influence the Magna Carta of 1215.

In 1101 there was another attempt to bring in Robert of Normandy by removing King Henry, but this time Bigod stayed loyal to the king.

Bigot died on 9 September 1107 and is buried in Norwich. Upon his death, there was a dispute over his burial place between the Bishop of Norwich, Herbert Losinga, and the monks at Thetford Priory founded by Bigod. The monks claimed his body, along with those of his family and successors, had been left to them by Bigot for burial in the priory in his foundation charter (as was common practice at the time). The bishop of Norwich stole the body in the middle of the night and had him buried in the new cathedral he had built in Norwich.

For some time, Bigod was thought to have two wives, Adelaide/Adeliza and Alice/Adeliza de Tosny. It is now believed these were the same woman, Adeliza (Alice) de Tosny (Toeni, Toeny). She was the sister and coheiress of William de Tosny, Lord of Belvoir. Their father was Robert de Todeni.

Bigod was succeeded by his eldest son, William Bigod, and, after William drowned in the disastrous sinking of the White Ship in 1120, by his second son, Hugh Bigod, 1st Earl of Norfolk. He also had three or four daughters: Gunnor, who married Robert fitz Swein of Essex, Lord of Rayleigh; Cecily, who married William d'Aubigny "Brito"; Maud, who married William d'Aubigny "Pincerna", and was mother to William d'Aubigny, 1st Earl of Arundel; and an unknown daughter, often called Joan or Jane, who was the supposed mother of Roger fitz Richard.

== Sources ==
- William of Jumièges. Gesta Normannorum Ducum ISBN 9780198205203
- Cokayne, G. E. The Complete Peerage of England, Volume 9 ISBN 9780904387827
- Keats-Rohan, K. S. B., Domesday People: a Prosopography of Persons Occurring in English Documents, 1066–1166. I. Domesday Book Woodbridge, UK: Boydell Press ISBN 9780851157221
