= Roger Bigod, 5th Earl of Norfolk =

English peer

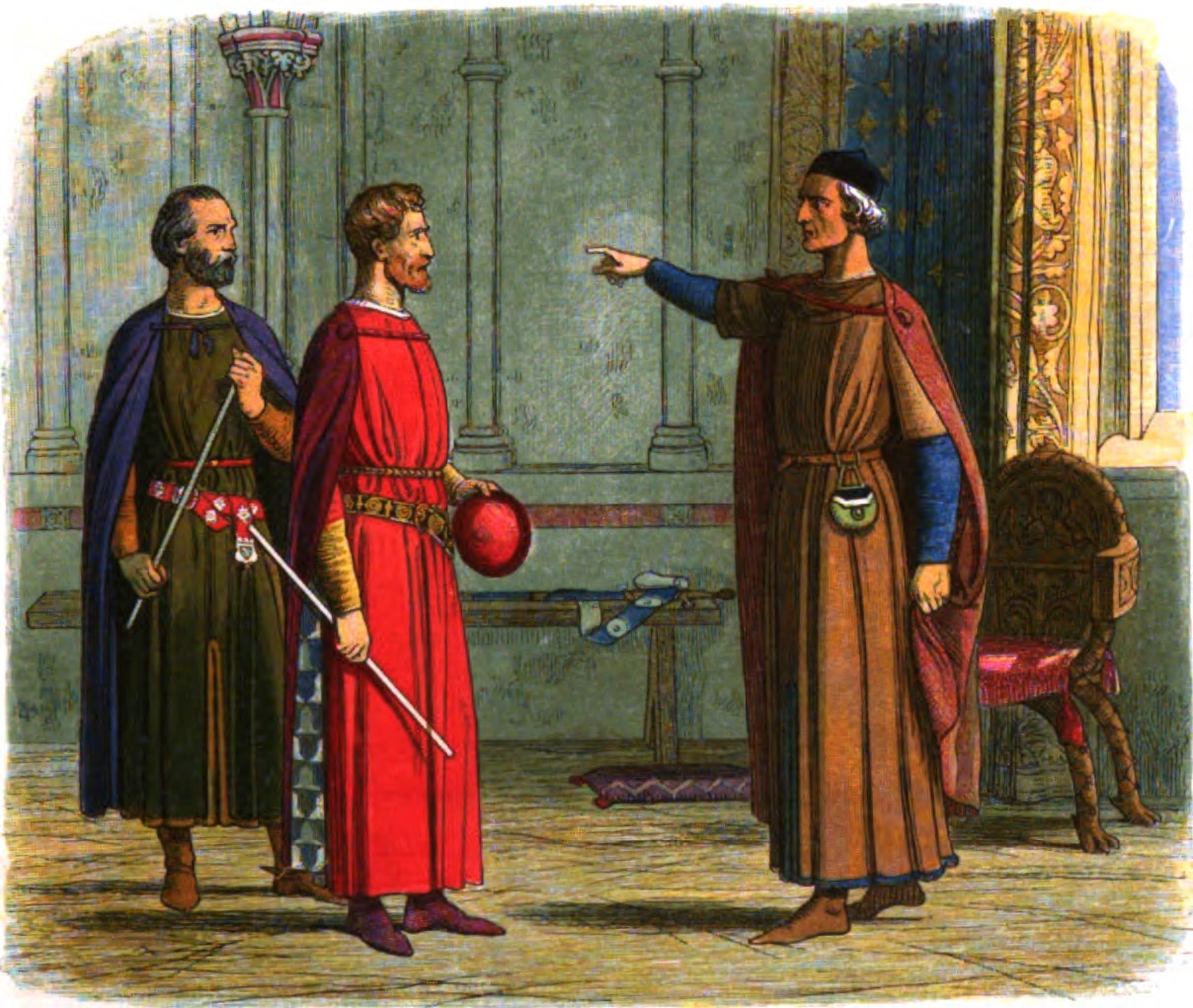
Edward I threatening Bigod to comply with his orders: "You shall either go, or hang!"

Roger Bigod (c. 1245 – bf. 6 December 1306) was 5th Earl of Norfolk.

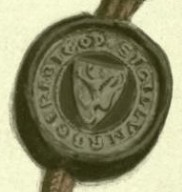
Seal of Roger Bigod appended to the Barons' Letter, 1301, showing arms of a lion rampant. He signed as Rogerus Bigo. Comes Norff. & Marescallus Anglie (Roger Bigod Earl of Norfolk & Marshal of England). These arms, Per pale or and vert, a lion rampant gules are the arms first adopted by his great-grandfather William Marshal, 1st Earl of Pembroke (1147–1219), Marshal of England, which Roger Bigod himself adopted following his own appointment as Marshal of England, as is recorded in the following rolls of arms: Falkirk Roll (1298)(H3); St George's Roll (E18). Previously he had borne: Or, a cross gules, as recorded in the following rolls of arms: Glover's Roll (B3); St George's Roll (E23)

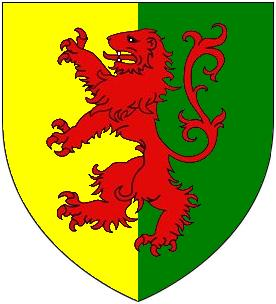
Arms of "Bigod Modern": Per pale or and vert, a lion rampant gules, adopted by Roger Bigod, 5th Earl of Norfolk, after 1269 following his inheritance of the office of Marshal of England from the Marshal family, of which these had formerly been the armorials

Arms of "Bigod Ancient", dropped post-1269 by Roger Bigod, 5th Earl of Norfolk following his inheritance of the office of Marshal of England: Or, a cross gules as recorded as borne by him in the following rolls of arms: Glover's Roll (B3); St George's Roll (E23)

== Origins ==
He was the son of Hugh Bigod (1211–1266), Justiciar, and succeeded his father's elder brother Roger Bigod, 4th Earl of Norfolk (1209–1270) as 5th Earl of Norfolk in 1270.

== Career ==
Bigod is the hero of an altercation with King Edward I in 1297, which arose from the king's command that Bigod should serve against the King of France in Gascony, while Edward himself went to Flanders. Bigod asserted that by the feudal tenure of his lands he was only compelled to serve across the seas in the company of the king himself, whereupon Edward said, "By God, Earl, you shall either go or hang," to which Bigod replied, "By the same oath, O king, I will neither go nor hang."

Bigod gained his point, and after Edward had left for France, together with Humphrey de Bohun, 3rd Earl of Hereford, Bigod prevented the collection of an aid for the war and forced Edward to confirm the charters in this year of 1297 and again in 1301. The historian William Stubbs reckoned Bigod and Bohun as "but degenerate sons of mighty fathers; greater in their opportunities than in their patriotism."

Bigod had done good service for the King in the past. In August 1282, for instance, contemporary accounts record Bigod "going to Wales on the king's service." During his absence in Ireland, Bigod had sent letters nominating Reginald Lyvet and William Cadel to act as his attorneys in England for the year. Reginald Lyvet was probably the son of Gilbert de Lyvet, who was Lord Mayor of Dublin for several terms in the early thirteenth century, and was a partisan of William Marshal, 1st Earl of Pembroke. Some scholars have wondered how English barons like Bigod and the Clares kept such a tight hold on their Irish lands during a time when the English grip on Ireland was starting to weaken. Apparently part of the secret was the delegation of authority, as in this case by Bigod to his lieutenants Lyvet and Cadel.

== Marriages ==
Bigod married firstly Aline Basset, widow of Hugh le Despencer, 1st Baron le Despencer (d. 1265), and daughter and heiress of Sir Philip Basset of Soham, Cambridgeshire, by his first wife Hawise de Lovaine, daughter of Sir Matthew de Lovaine, by whom he had no issue.

He married secondly Alice of Hainault, daughter of John II de Avenes, Count of Hainault, by Philippine, daughter of Henry, Count of Luxembourg and Roche, Marquis of Arlon, by whom he had no issue.

== Death ==
Bigod died on 6 December 1306.

== Succession ==
In 1302 the elderly and childless Bigod surrendered his earldom to the king and received it back entailed "to the heirs of his body". This had the effect of disinheriting his brother John. Thus, when Roger died without issue in December 1306, his title became extinct, and his estates escheated to the crown and were eventually bestowed on Thomas of Brotherton, 1st Earl of Norfolk.

== Notes ==
Political offices
Preceded by The Earl of Norfolk	Lord Marshal; 1269–1306	Succeeded by Robert de Clifford
Peerage of England
Preceded by Roger Bigod	Earl of Norfolk; 1270–1306	Extinct
