= Marshal family =

Anglo-Norman family

Marshal li Mareschal (Norman), le Marechal (French)
- Family of Earls and Marshals
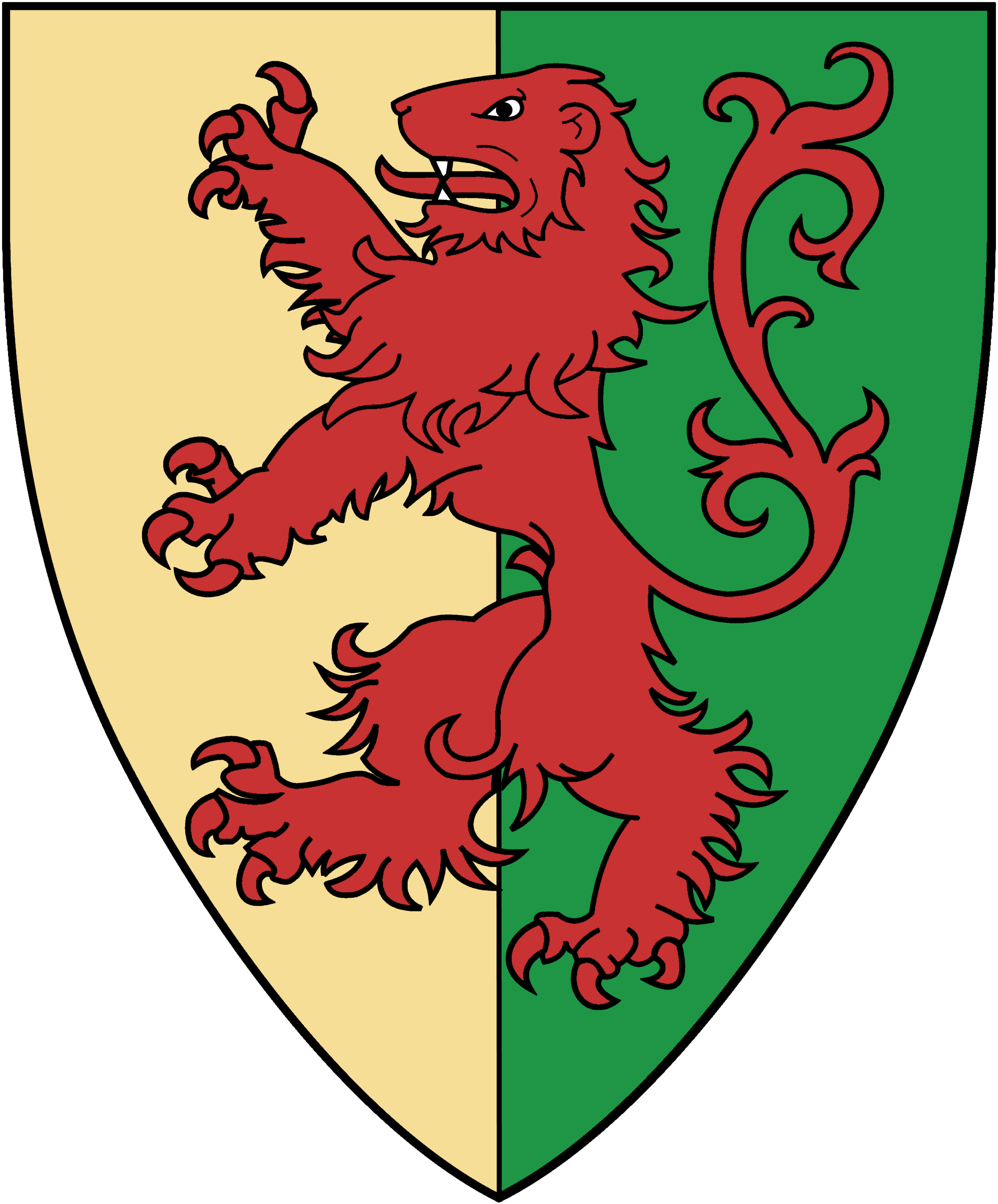
- Arms of William Marshal, 1st Earl of Pembroke
- Country: England
- Etymology: Marshal, Frankish: "a person who tended horses"
- Origin: England
- Founded: 12th century (first known member)
- Founder: Gilbert Giffard
- Final ruler: Ansel Marshal (as Earl of Pembroke), John Marshal (as Baron Marshal)
- Final head: Hawyse, daughter of William Marshal
- Titles: List: Lord Marshal; Earl of Pembroke; Earl Marshal of Ireland; Baron Marshal

The Marshal family was a noble family of Anglo-Norman origins. Their name, Marshal, derives from the Frankish term for "a person who tended horses". By 1066 the term was used for a position in royal and aristocratic households.

== History ==
The first known member of the Marshal family is Gilbert Giffard, who is of unknown origin. He would become a tenant of Glastonbury manor in Winterbourne Monkton in Wiltshire, and held a position as a marshal to the king of England. The surname "Giffard" is a common Norman sobriquet, and it means "chubby-cheeks". While it is unlikely that Gilbert was related to Walter Giffard, he may have been related to the Giffards of Brimpsfield. It's worth noting that, according to the History of William Marshal, there were two men named Gilbert: Gilbert Giffard and Gilbert Marshal, and the first was the latter's son or son in law. David Crouch says that the History is not always to be trusted, but that this option could be chronologically possible. Thomas Asbridge and N.E. Stacy, as well as other authors, mention Gilbert (Giffard) as a single person and as John Marshal's father.

When Gilbert died, his son, John Marshal (I), took his position. John fought for Empress Matilda (Daughter of Henry I) in her unsuccessful struggle to gain the throne from her cousin, King Stephen, during the Anarchy. After John the title of marshal (later Earl Marshal) became honorific and hereditary.

John's first son was John Marshal (II), who inherited his position as marshal and retained it until his death in 1194. He only had one known son, also called John Marshal (III), but he was illegitimate, so the title went to John (II)‘s brother instead. The position of marshal will be later claimed by a descendant of this illegitimate line, William Marshal, 1st Baron Marshal.

John (II)'s brother was the well-known William Marshal, 1st Earl of Pembroke. He was formally appointed marshal by Richard the Lionheart. William served five English kings in his lifetime: Henry II, Henry "the Young King", Richard I "The Lionheart", John Lackland, and Henry III, to whom he became regent in 1216. In 1199 he became the Earl of Pembroke, having married Isabel de Clare.

After William died in 1219, the titles of marshal and Earl of Pembroke eventually passed on to all of his sons, as none of them had any legitimate issue: William, Richard, Gilbert, Walter and Ansel. After Ansel's death, the title of Earl of Pembroke became extinct (but it was re-created in 1247), and the title of marshal was given to descendants of his eldest sister Maud's husband, Hugh Bigod, 3rd Earl of Norfolk. The current Duke of Norfolk still holds the title.

The historian Matthew Paris addresses the rapid extinction of the Marshal lineage to a curse bestowed upon the family by the bishop of Ferns, Albin O'Molloy, after exactions on his diocese levied by William Marshal the elder. Paris claims that when Ansel and his brothers were in their prime, their mother Isabel had foretold that "all would be earls of the same county".

Another of William's titles, Earl Marshal of Ireland, was not held by his children, but by the previously mentioned John Marshal (III), his nephew. The title remained in this line of the family until the death of John Marshal, 2nd Baron Marshal, when it was given to his sister Hawyse's husband, Robert Morley, 2nd Baron Morley, in absence of any other house members.

== Family tree ==
- Gilbert Giffard, marshal of England
  - John Marshal (I)/ FitzGilbert, marshal of England, married (1) Adelina Pipard and (2) Sybil of Salisbury
    - Gilbert, died by September 1166 (by Adelina)
    - Walter, died before his father (by Adelina)
    - John Marshal (II), marshal of England, married a daughter of baron Adam du Port (by Sybil)
      - John Marshal (III) of Hockering, Earl Marshal of Ireland, married Adeline de Rie (illegitimate; his mother was Alice de Colleville)
        - John Marshal (IV), Earl Marshal of Ireland
        - William Marshal, Earl Marshal of Ireland
          - John Marshal (V), Earl Marshal of Ireland
            - William Marshal of Hingham, 1st Baron Marshal
              - John Marshal (VI), 2nd Baron Marshal
              - Hawyse Marshal, married Robert Morley, 2nd Baron Morley
              - Denise Marshal
        - Alice de Carhou
    - William Marshal, Earl of Pembroke, married Isabel de Clare (by Sybil)
      - William Marshal, 2nd Earl of Pembroke, married (1) Alice, daughter of Baldwin of Bethune and (2) Eleanor Plantagenet; had no issue
      - Richard Marshal, 3rd Earl of Pembroke, married Gervaise de Dinan; had no issue
      - Matilda Marshal (also Maud), married (1) Hugh Bigod and (2) William de Warenne
      - Gilbert Marshal, 4th Earl of Pembroke, married Marjorie (daughter of William I of Scotland)
        - Isabel Marshal, betrothed to Rhys ap Maelgwn, son of Maelgwn ap Rhys (illegitimate; unknown mother)
      - Walter Marshal, 5th Earl of Pembroke, married Margaret de Quincy; had no issue
      - Isabel Marshal, married (1) Gilbert de Clare and (2) Richard of Cornwall
      - Sybil Marshal, married William de Ferrers
      - Eva Marshal, married William de Braose
      - Ansel Marshal, 6th Earl of Pembroke, married Maud, daughter of Humphrey de Bohun; had no issue
      - Joan Marshal, married Warin de Munchensi; they were the parents of Joan de Munchensi
      - Gilbert Marshal of Sundon and Mundham (illegitimate; mother belongs to the “Essex family”)
    - Henry Marshal, Bishop of Exeter (by Sybil)
    - Ansel Marshal, household knight (by Sybil)
    - (probably) a daughter, married William le Gros
    - Margaret, married (1) Ralph de Somery and (2) Maurice de Gaunt (by Sybil)
    - Matilda, married Robert de Pont de l'Arche
  - William Giffard, held a clerical office and acted as Empress Matilda's chancellor
    - (possibly) William, held a clerical office in "Cheddar Church"

== Sources ==
- Stacy, N.E. (1999). Henry of Blois and the Lordship of Glastonbury. Oxford University Press.
- Crouch, David (2002). William Marshal: knighthood, war and chivalry, 1147-1219. Routledge.
- William Marshal, 1st Earl of Pembroke. Encyclopædia Britannica. 2023.
- Sir Harris Nicolas, Nicolas (1825). A synopsis of the peerage of England: exhibiting, under alphabetical arrangement, the date of creation, descent and present state of every title of peerage which has existed in this country since the conquest. Unknown publisher.
- Leckie Jarman, Thomas (1930). William Marshal First Earl Of Pembroke And Regent Of England 1216 1219. B. Blackwell.
- Painter, Sidney (1933). William Marshal. The Johns Hopkins Press.
- The Marshal family of Hamstead. Cambridge University Press. 2015.
- Round, John Horace (1911). The king's serjeants & officers of state, with their coronation services. James Nisbet & co.
