= Histoire de Guillaume le Maréchal =

Anglo-Norman biography of William Marshal

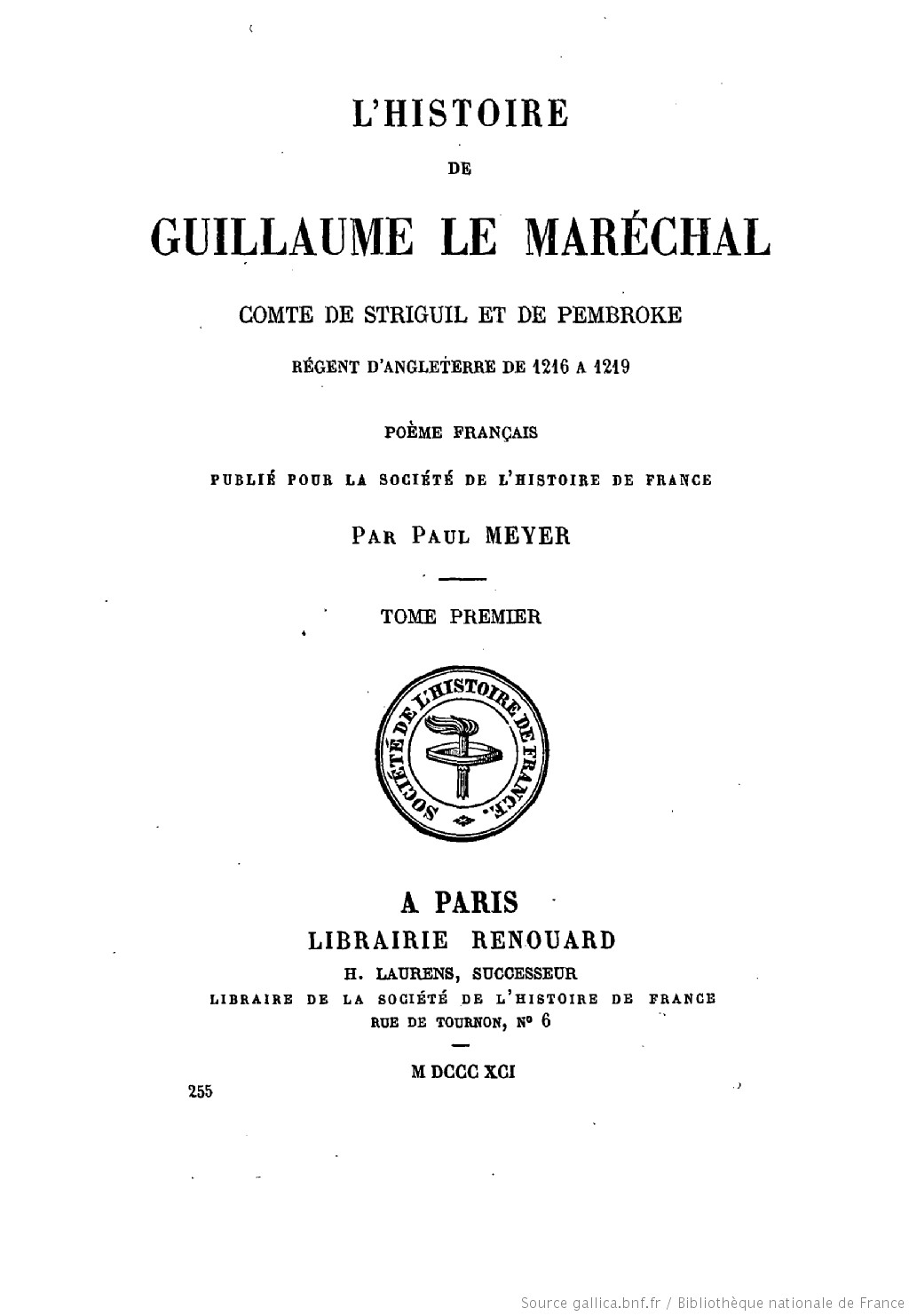
L'Histoire de Guillaume le Marechal

The Histoire de Guillaume le Maréchal ("History of William the Marshal") is a near-contemporary Anglo-Norman biography of the English nobleman, William Marshal (died 1219). In terms of genre it is therefore something of a rarity for its period, as it fits all the characteristics of a true biography, being William's story from cradle to grave, and moreover it examines the life of a lay person. It is a substantial work composed in 19,214 octosyllabic lines of plain verse in the French dialect of the Touraine. It shows little trace in its composition of any influence of the medieval schools. A modest number of Latin vitae or biographies survive from the period, almost all of them of clergymen. Its author was not entirely divorced from Latin scholarship, however.

== Authorship ==
Its author names himself in a closing colophon to the work as John (Johans) 'who wrote this book' (lines 19195–6). Attempts have been made to identify this John with the other John mentioned in the colophon as having a hand in the composition: this was John of Earley (died 1229), one of the old Marshal's wards as a youth, and later his household knight and banneret. That he was one and the same as the John who was the author was a throw away suggestion of the discoverer and first editor of the text, Paul Meyer (1840–1917). His suggestion was adopted by several historians as fact. One of Marshal's better modern biographers, Sidney Painter (1902–1960), referred to Earley as his late lord's 'biographer'. It was an identification still being championed in 1998. This has not been sustainable since the publication between 2002 and 2007 of the modern analytical edition by a team headed by Professor Tony Holden (1925–2009). It found the History was composed in a French dialect of the Loire Valley, not the Anglo-Norman dialect that John of Earley, who came from the English West Country, would have spoken. In his treatment of events the author showed an ignorance of English political life John of Earley would not have exhibited. The author tells us further that he relied for much of his basic material on written memoirs sent him by the Marshal's friends concerning what they witnessed which again John of Earley would not have required. The conclusion from the details he revealed is that John the author was probably a young poet commissioned by the Marshal's friends and relatives from the former Angevin lands along the river Loire, well acquainted with the cities and castles of Anjou and Normandy.

== Manuscript ==
There is a single manuscript of the work, which the young Paul Meyer noticed in 1861 browsing the sale room of Sotheby's during the disposal of the manuscripts of Saville collection, compiled by the justice and antiquary Sir John Savile in the late 16th century. It was swept up by the bibliophile Sir Thomas Phillipps at the time and did not resurface till Meyer tracked it down amongst the remnants of Phillipps estate in 1880 and was able to study and identify it for what it was. In 1958 it was acquired by the Pierpont Morgan Library in New York, where it remains as manuscript M. 888. It is a book of 127 folios in a mid 13th century hand. It is not the author's original manuscript but a copy of one of his drafts by an English copyist who modified the original language towards his own Anglo-Norman dialect. Three other copies are once known to have existed from medieval library catalogues.

== Date and Sources ==
Paul Meyer in his edition of the History calculated that the author commenced his work for his patron William Marshal the Younger in 1224, when the young earl left to take up his appointment as justiciar of Ireland and worked on it till the summer of 1226. David Crouch's analysis of the author's sources revealed by his work finds that the poet was an assiduous researcher. He deployed a range of items he found in the Marshal family archive for the early period of the Marshal's life, many of them generated by his tournament career: lists of ransoms, a French language history of the exploits of his master Young King Henry between 1176 and 1182, and a great roll of the French royal tournament of Lagny-sur-Marne in 1179. For the later period he had access to Marshal's state correspondence and solicited written memoirs from the old man's friends and colleagues for the period from the 1180s onward. The author counted for much of the colour of his work on family anecdotes passed on to him by Marshal's sons and his knight and executor, John of Earley. On one occasion he can be proved to have used for the Marshal's childhood a Latin chronicle then kept at Gloucester Abbey.

== Reception ==
Since Meyer's edition the History has assumed increasing importance in the understanding of the life of the aristocracy of the 12th and early 13th centuries. It has provided the material for nearly a dozen modern biographies of its hero. Georges Duby praised the work as 'infinitely precious: the memory of chivalry in an almost pure state, about which, without this evidence, we should know virtually nothing'. John W. Baldwin has commented that 'much of the modern understanding of twelfth-century chivalry is simply the life of William the Marshal writ large'. Each period finds its own Marshal. Sidney Painter and Georges Duby treated him as the definitive chivalric male, picking up the author's constant emphasis on the Marshal's loyalty to his lords, even as unworthy a lord as John of England. With the 1980s and a move away from 19th-century ideas of what chivalry may have been came a reassessment. David Crouch presented in 1990 a different, more intelligent and accomplished Marshal, a skilful courtier trading on his military talents and masterfully charting a course through the dangerous waters of European royal and princely courts. He also pointed out the author's concern to construct a defence of the late earl from the accusations being brought against his reputation at the royal court of the 1220s.

== Editions ==
- Paul Meyer (1840–1917), ed., Histoire de Guillaume le Maréchal, comte de Striguil et de Pembroke, régent d'Angleterre, Paris, Société de l'histoire de France, 1891–1901, with a partial translation of the original sources into modern French. Also available here.
- A. J. Holden, D. Crouch, edd.; S. Gregory, trans., History of William Marshal. 3 vols London: Anglo-Norman Text Society, Occasional Series, 4-6 (2002–2007).

== See also ==
- Anglo-Norman literature
