= William Marshal, 2nd Earl of Pembroke =

English noble (1190–1231)

William Marshal
- Earl of Pembroke
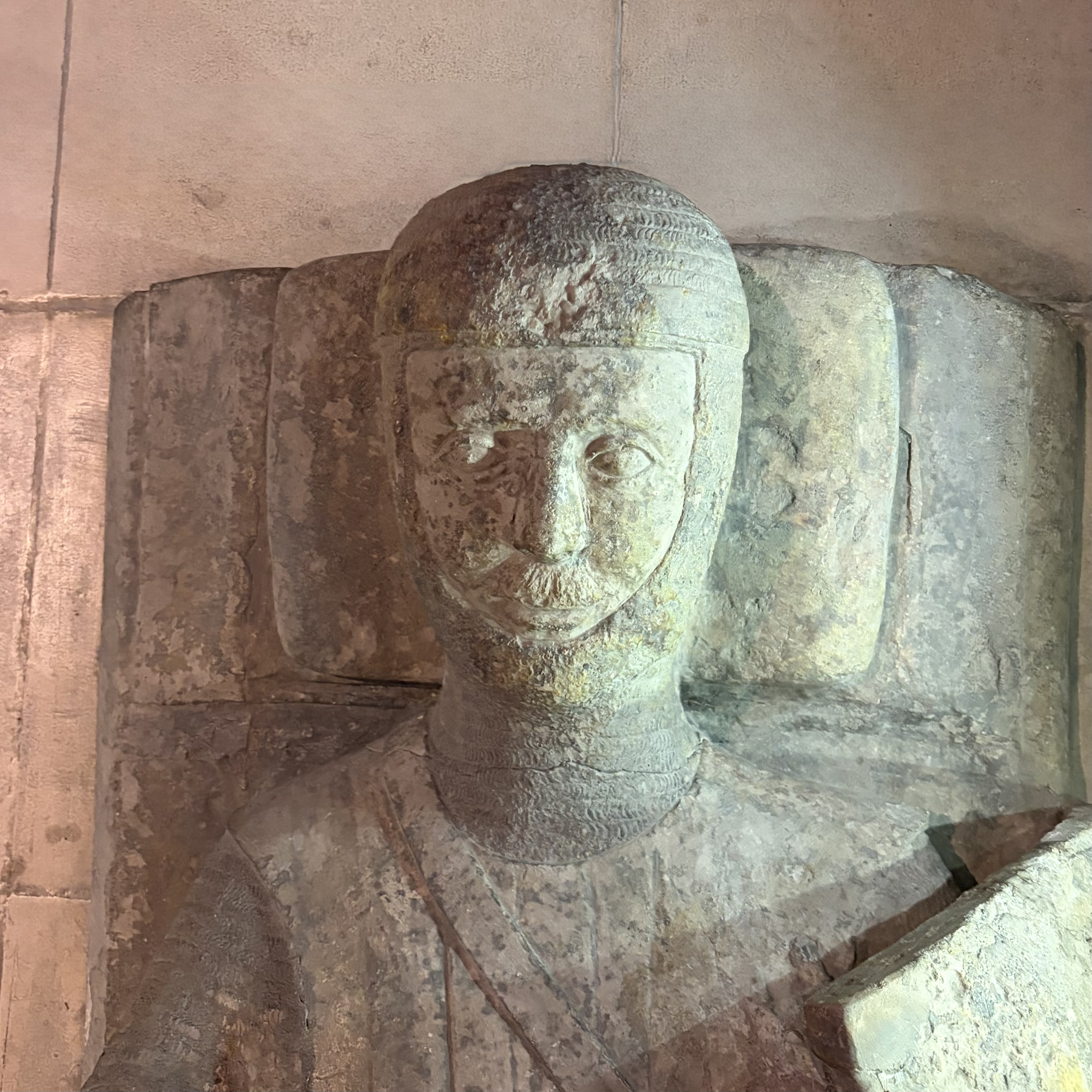
- Possible tomb effigy of William Marshal in Temple Church, London
- Born: 1190; Duchy of Normandy, Kingdom of England
- Died: 6 April 1231 (aged 40–41)
- Buried: Temple Church, London
- Noble family: Marshal
- Spouse: Alice de Bethune (m. 1203; died 1215) Eleanor of England (m. 1224)
- Father: William Marshal
- Mother: Isabel de Clare

William Marshal, 2nd Earl of Pembroke (French: Guillaume le Maréchal) (1190 – 6 April 1231) was a medieval English nobleman and one of the sureties of Magna Carta. He fought during the First Barons' War and was present at the Battle of Lincoln (1217) alongside his father William Marshal, 1st Earl of Pembroke, who led the English troops. He commissioned the first biography of a medieval knight to be written, called L'Histoire de Guillaume le Mareschal, in honour of his father.

== Early life ==
William was born in Normandy probably during the spring of 1190, the eldest son of William Marshal, 1st Earl of Pembroke, and his wife, Isabel de Clare, suo jure 4th Countess of Pembroke and Striguil. He was a member of the Marshal Family.

His early contract of marriage to Alice de Bethune in 1203 and his connections to Baldwin de Bethune the younger and the Aumale knight, Richard Siward, may indicate that he was at some time fostered with his father's ally, Baldwin, Count of Aumale.

He was taken as hostage by King John after his father in 1205 paid homage to the enemy of England, King Philip II of France, and lived from the ages of 15 to 22 at the court of King John as a guarantor of his father's loyal behaviour. He was released from wardship upon his majority in 1212, and married in 1214. Alice being her father's sole heir enabled him to use her lands and influence to build up his own retinue of knights, which included Fulk fitzWarin, his first cousins, the four Le Gros brothers, and Baldwin de Bethune the younger, bastard brother of his wife.

== Career ==
=== Barons' War ===
During the First Barons' War of 1215, William was on the side of the rebels supporting the claim of Prince Louis of France while his father was fighting for the right of the English king. He was present at the meeting at Stamford in February 1215. In June he was one of the twenty-five executors of Magna Carta, and was consequently excommunicated by Innocent III on 11 December that year. When King Louis captured Worcester Castle in 1216, the younger William was helpfully warned by his father to flee from the castle, which he did just before Ranulph de Blondeville, 4th Earl of Chester retook it. In March 1217, he was absolved from excommunication and rejoined the royal cause. At the Battle of Lincoln in 1217 he was fighting alongside his father.

=== Earl Marshal ===
He was with his father when he died in 1219, succeeding him as both Earl of Pembroke and as Lord Marshal of England. These two powerful titles, combined with the elder Marshal's legendary status, made William one of the most prominent and powerful nobles in England. He also inherited the family properties in Normandy, but deeded them to his younger brother Richard by a charter dated 20 June 1220.

=== Wales and Ireland ===
In 1223, William crossed over from his Irish lands to campaign against Llywelyn the Great, who had attacked his holding of Pembroke. He was successful, but his actions were seen as too independent by the regents of the young King Henry III. On 23 April 1224, William was married to Eleanor, sister of the King, in order to strengthen the Marshal family's connection with the Plantagenets. Hugh de Lacy began attacking Irish lands held by William together with the royal demesnes in that island. William was appointed as Justiciar of Ireland (1224–1226) and managed to subdue de Lacy. In 1225, he founded the Dominican Priory of the Holy Trinity in Kilkenny and began the construction of Carlow and Ferns castles. Due to his support of Aedh Ua Conchobair against Richard de Burgh in their claims to Connacht, he was dismissed as Justiciar, surrendering office to the king at Winchester on 22 June 1226. Due to his continued support, he was later that year ordered to surrender to the crown the custody of the royal castles of Cardigan and Carmarthen which he had captured from Llywelyn.

=== Brittany ===
William accompanied the king to Brittany in 1230, and assumed control of the forces when the king returned to England. In February 1231, William returned to England, and arranged the marriage of his sister Isabel, widow of Gilbert de Clare, to Richard, Earl of Cornwall, brother of King Henry III.

== Marriages ==
William married twice, but produced no surviving children:

- Firstly, in September 1214, aged 24, William married Alice de Bethune (d. pre-1215), daughter of his father's ally Baldwin of Bethune.
- Secondly, in 1224 William married Eleanor of England, youngest daughter of King John by Isabella of Angoulême.

== Death and burial ==
William died on 6 April 1231. Matthew Paris recorded that Hubert de Burgh, Justiciar of England, was later accused of poisoning William, but there are no other sources to support this. He was buried on 15 April in the Temple Church in London, next to his father, where his effigy may still be seen.

== Legacy ==
William was responsible for the commissioning of L'Histoire de Guillaume le Mareschal, the first known biography of a medieval knight, in order to record his father's extraordinary career. Based on oral and written testimony, it was completed in 1226.

As William had no surviving children, his titles passed to his younger brother Richard Marshal, 3rd Earl of Pembroke. His lack of male heirs was credited to a curse bestowed upon the family by the Bishop of Ferns, Ailbe Ua Maíl Mhuaidh according to Matthew Paris. All of William's brothers inherited the title successively, but none had children and the male line of the family died out on the death of Anselm Marshal in 1245.

Political offices
Preceded by William Marshal	Lord Marshal; 1219–1231	Succeeded by Richard Marshal
Preceded by Henry de Loundres	Justiciar of Ireland; 1224–1226	Succeeded by Geoffrey de Marisco
Peerage of England
Preceded by William Marshal	Earl of Pembroke; 1219–1231	Succeeded by Richard Marshal
