= William Marshal, 1st Baron Marshal =

13th-14th century English nobleman

William Marshal
- Arms of William Marshal, as shown in Caerlaverock Roll (1301): Gules, a bend engrailed or.

Marshal of Ireland
- Reign: 1282 - 24 June 1314
- Predecessor: John Marshal (V)
- Successor: John Marshal (VI)
- Died: 24 June 1314
- Noble family: Marshal (illegitimate branch)
- Issue: John Marshal (VI); Hawyse Marshal; Denise Marshal
- Father: John Marshal (V)

William Marshal, 1st baron Marshal (24 September 1277 - 24 June 1314), was a minor English noble that held the position of marshal of Ireland. He was a member of the Marshal family through a collateral line.

He was the son of John Marshal (V). When his father died in 1282 he was only 5 years old, and in 1283 John de Bohun paid 2,500 marks for his wardship. In 1308 William carried the spurs at king Edward II's coronation. In 1309 he was summoned to Parliament as a baron. When Roger Bigod, the last earl of Norfolk, died, the position or marshal of England became vacant, and William unsuccessfully claimed the office by hereditary right against Nicholas de Segrave. The strife was so fierce that on 20 July 1311 both William and Nicholas were forbidden to attend parliament armed.

William took part in the First war of Scottish independence, and he was killed at the Battle of Bannockburn on 24 June 1314.

== Marriage and issue ==
William is known to have had the following issue:

- John Marshal, 2nd Baron Marshal.
- Hawyse Marshal, married Robert de Morley.
- Denise Marshal.

William's children were the last known members of the Marshal family.

Court offices
Preceded by John Marshal	Earl Marshal of Ireland; 1283–1314	Succeeded by John Marshal, 2nd Baron Marshal
