= Department of History (University of California, Berkeley) =

- Type: Public
- Parent institution: UC Berkeley College of Letters and Science
- Location: Berkeley, California, U.S.
- Website: history.berkeley.edu

The Department of History is an academic department within the Social Sciences Division at the College of Letters and Science at the University of California, Berkeley. The history department offers bachelor's degrees, master's degrees, and doctorate degrees in history.

== Academics ==
The undergraduate program provides students a B.A. in History upon completion of lower- and upper-division requirements. Students are also able to join Phi Alpha Theta, the history honors society, or contribute to Clio's Scroll, the undergraduate history journal.

The graduate program in history prepares students for careers in academia, non-profits, government agencies, private sector, and more. Although the department does not offer a terminal master's degree, students may earn one en route to completing a PhD. The department selects about 20 students per year. Students are expected to complete their degree within a seven-year timeframe.

== Notable faculty ==
- Herbert Bolton
- Beshara Doumani
- Erich S. Gruen
- David Hollinger
- Eugene F. Irschick
- Martin Jay
- Adrienne Koch
- Thomas W. Laqueur
- Joseph R. Levenson
- Leon F. Litwack
- Nicholas V. Riasanovsky
- Peter Sahlins
- Raphael Sealey
- Ethan H. Shagan
- Yuri Slezkine
- Kenneth M. Stampp
- Derek Van Rheenen
- Frederic Wakeman
- James Vernon
- Paula S. Fass
- Ussama Makdisi
- Maria Mavroudi
