= Marshal of Ireland =

Marshal of Ireland may refer to:

- Earl Marshal of Ireland, medieval appointment, latterly ceremonial
- Commander-in-Chief, Ireland § Marshal of Ireland, early modern military appointment
