= John Marshal, 2nd Baron Marshal =

Distant relative of William Marshal, 1st Earl of Pembroke

John Marshal

Marshal of Ireland
- Reign: 24 June 1314 - 1316/17
- Predecessor: William Marshal
- Successor: Robert Morley
- Born: 1301/02/03
- Died: 1316/17
- Noble family: Marshal (illegitimate branch)
- Father: William Marshal

John Marshal, 2nd baron Marshal (1301/02/03 - 1316/17) was a minor English noble. He was the son of William Marshal, 1st Baron Marshal.

After his father died at the Battle of Bannockburn in 1314, John inherited the positions of marshal of Ireland and baron Marshal, along with Hingham and other possessions in Norfolk, Hallingbury and Essex. John died in either 1316 or 1317 at the age of 15, and he passed everything onto his sister Hawyse, wife of Robert Morley. Robert subsequently became marshal of Ireland de jure uxoris.

He was the last known male-line descendant of the Marshal family.
