= Cambridge History of Britain =

The Cambridge History of Britain is a series of textbooks published by the Cambridge University Press aimed at first-year undergraduates and above. It covers the history of Britain from c. 500 to the present day in four volumes. The volumes are:

- Naismith, Rory (2021). Early Medieval Britain c. 500–1000. Cambridge University Press. ISBN 978-1-1084-2444-8.
- Crouch, David (2017). Medieval Britain c. 1000–1500. Cambridge University Press. ISBN 978-0-5211-90718.
- Miller, John (2017). Early Modern Britain c. 1450–1750. Cambridge University Press. ISBN 978--1107-01511-1.
- Vernon, James (2017). Modern Britain c. 1750 to the Present. Cambridge University Press. ISBN 978-1-1076-8600-7.
