= Scrope v Grosvenor =

1389 heraldic law case in England

- The shield blazoned Azure, a bend Or, the right to bear which was the subject of the case
- Court: High Court of Chivalry
- Full case name: Richard Scrope, 1st Baron Scrope of Bolton v Robert Grosvenor
- Decided: 1389

Case history
- Subsequent action: Judgment personally affirmed by the King (27 May 1390)

Holding
- (1) The same undifferenced arms could not be held by two persons within the same nation at the same time. (2) Scrope demonstrated a superior claim to the arms Azure, a bend Or within the English system of arms, and Grosvenor must either difference the arms or choose new ones.

Court membership
- Judge sitting: The Duke of Gloucester

Scrope v Grosvenor (1389) (Note: Spoken as "Scrope and Grosvenor." /ˈskroʊp ... ˈɡroʊv.nə(r)/ The v in the case title is an abbreviation of the Latin in versus, but is normally pronounced "and" for civil cases in England and Wales.) was an early lawsuit relating to the law of arms. One of the earliest heraldic cases brought in England, the case resulted from two different knights in King Richard II's service, Richard Scrope, 1st Baron Scrope of Bolton, and Sir Robert Grosvenor, discovering they were using the same undifferenced coat of arms, blazoned Azure, a bend Or. This had previously gone unnoticed because the armigers' families were from different parts of England. As the law of arms by the 14th century prohibited armigers within the same system of arms from holding the same undifferenced arms, Scrope brought suit against Grosvenor in 1386 to determine who would be allowed to continue using the arms in question; the Court of Chivalry found in Scrope's favour in 1389, and King Richard affirmed the decision the following year.

== Historical background ==
In the 12th and 13th centuries, the composition of coats of arms quite often consisted of only one charge and two tinctures. This simplicity meant that unrelated families often bore the same designs. By the 14th century, the sharing of coats of arms had become less tolerated. In many cases, the monarch was the final arbiter.

== Heraldic case ==
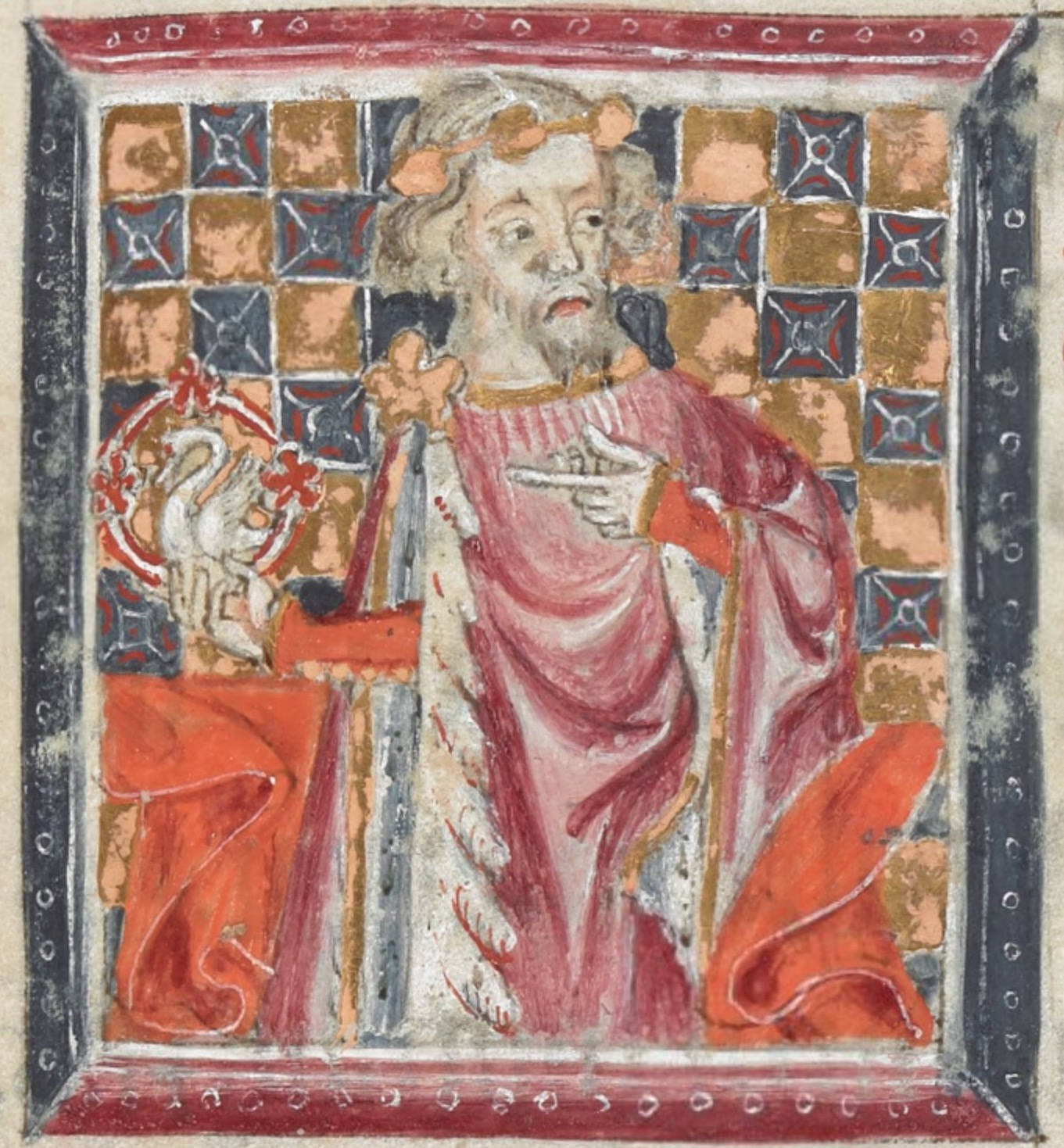
Thomas of Woodstock, Duke of Gloucester judged the case.

In 1385, Richard II led his army on a punitive expedition to Scotland. During the military campaign, two of the king's knights, Richard Scrope, 1st Baron Scrope of Bolton, from Bolton in Yorkshire, and Sir Robert Grosvenor from Cheshire, both realised they were using the same coat of arms, blazoned Azure, a bend or. When Scrope brought an action, Grosvenor maintained his family had worn these arms since his ancestor had come to England with William the Conqueror in 1066.

The case was brought before the Court of Chivalry and presided over by Thomas of Woodstock, 1st Duke of Gloucester, the Constable of England. Several hundred witnesses were heard, including John of Gaunt, Duke of Lancaster; Geoffrey Chaucer (who spoke on behalf of Sir Richard Scrope), himself a close friend of the Duke of Lancaster and a sometime member of his court; and a then little-known Welshman called Owain Glyndŵr, who gave his evidence with others at the Church of St John the Baptist in Chester on 3 September 1386.

It was not until 1389 that the case was finally decided in Scrope's favor. Grosvenor was allowed to continue bearing the arms but they had to be within a bordure argent for difference.

Neither party was happy with the decision, so King Richard II was called upon to give his personal verdict. On 27 May 1390 he confirmed that Grosvenor could not bear the undifferenced arms. His opinion was that the two shields were far too similar for unrelated families in the same country to bear. The king nevertheless decided to uphold Grosvenor's request to annul the original decision, and accordingly Grosvenor's right to bear the new arms was denied.

== Third claimant ==
According to many of the trial witnesses, there was a third person who bore the arms Azure a Bend Or. During the reign of Edward III in the Hundred Years' War, Grosvenor had previously challenged the right of a Cornish knight, Thomas Carminow, to bear the arms while serving in France in 1360. But neither party stopped using the same coat of arms.

Carminow had also challenged the right of Scrope to bear the same arms. In this case, the Lord High Constable of England had ruled that both claimants had established their right to the arms. Carminow had stated that his family had borne the arms from the time of King Arthur, while Scrope said they had been used since the time of the Norman Conquest. The two families were ultimately judged to be of different heraldic nations: Scrope of England and Carminow of Cornwall. As stated in the trial records, Cornwall was then still considered a separate country, "a large land formerly bearing the name of a kingdom."

== Outcome ==
The subsequently adopted arms of Grosvenor: Azure, a Garb Or, the ancient arms of the Earls of Chester

Since the judgment of 1390, both the Carminow and Scrope families continued to use undifferenced arms, but Grosvenor had to choose a new design for his shield. He assumed arms of Azure a Garb Or, the ancient arms of the Earls of Chester. (In the terminology of blazons, a "garb" is a wheatsheaf.) This coat of arms is still used by his descendants, the Dukes of Westminster.

== Legacy ==
Window in York Minster donated by Henry Scrope, 3rd Baron Scrope of Masham; the Scrope arms appear five times at the base.

A thoroughbred racehorse, born in 1877 and owned by Hugh Grosvenor, 1st Duke of Westminster, was named Bend Or in allusion to the case. It won The Derby in 1880.

The 1st Duke's grandson, Hugh (1879–1953), afterwards 2nd Duke, was similarly from his childhood and in adult life known within family circles as "Bendor". His wife Loelia wrote in her memoirs: "Of course everybody, even his parents and sisters, would normally have addressed the baby as 'Belgrave' so they may have thought that any nickname was preferable. At all events it stuck, and my husband's friends never called him anything but Bendor or Benny".

Grosvenor arms in Chester.

The art historian Bendor Grosvenor, whose name is taken from the blazon "Bend Or", is a member of the Grosvenor family.

== See also ==
- Court of Chivalry
- College of Arms
- Warbelton v Gorges

== Notes ==
=== Bibliography ===
- Nicolas, Sir Nicholas Harris The Controversy between Sir Richard Scrope and Sir Robert Grosvenor in the Court of Chivalry AD MCCCLXXXV – MCCCXC, 3 Volumes:
  - Volume 1 (a transcript of the original Latin "Scrope and Grosvenor Roll" then held in the Tower of London), edited by Sir Nicholas Harris Nicolas, printed in limited edition of 150 copies by Samuel Bentley, London, 1832
  - Volume 2 (English translation), edited by Sir Nicholas Harris Nicolas, London, 1832
  - Volume 3, planned publication date 1833
