= Ansel Marshal =

Youngest son of William Marshal

- Earl of Pembroke (never inherited)
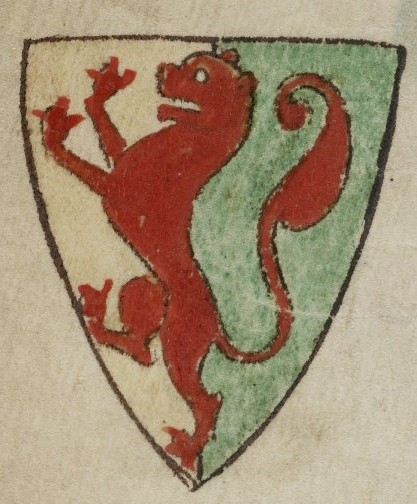
- The arms carried by all the Marshal earls of Pembroke
- Died: 23 December 1245; Chepstow Castle, Monmouthshire, Wales
- Buried: Tintern Abbey, Tintern
- Noble family: Marshal
- Spouse: Matilda de Bohun
- Father: William Marshal
- Mother: Isabel de Clare

Ansel Marshal (also Ancel or Hansel, usually Anseau in French, died 23 December 1245) was the youngest and last of the five lawful sons of William Marshal. The rarity of the name in England often led it to be mistaken for the Lombardic Anselm. He was named after his father's youngest brother, a household knight active in the 1170s.

== Life ==
Ansel was the youngest son of William Marshal and Isabel de Clare. He was reportedly born when his father was in his mid-sixties, during his Irish exile. When his father was writing his testament in 1219, he had initially planned not to give anything to Ansel, despite loving him. He then reconsidered, after his advisors's suggestment, and set aside an annuity of £140 for him, which was to come from a land in Leinster.

Ansel was a present figure both in the earlship of his brother Gilbert and in that of his brother Walter, frequently witnessing their acts. He married Matilda, daughter of Humphrey de Bohun. It was probably upon the marriage that he was granted by his brother the marshal manors of Avilgton and Awre in Gloucestershire, which he was already holding in December 1244 while hosting his father in law.

=== Inheritance and death ===
On 27 November 1245, Ansel's elder brother, Walter, died childless, and he succeeded him as Earl of Pembroke. On 3 December, King Henry III communicated his intention of delivering him the inheritance as soon as he paid him homage, but Ansel never did this as he must have already been ill at the time. He died of the illness at Chepstow Castle, probably on 23 December 1245. He was buried at Tintern Abbey near his mother and brother, ending the lawful male line of the Marshal family. Since he never received the inheritance, his widow Matilda was denied her dower (though she was assigned an annuity of £60) but she continued to call herself "Matilda Marshal" for the rest of her life, even after she remarried to Roger de Quincy. The king then assumed the control of the Marshal estate in order to divide them between Ansel's five sisters.

== Aftermath ==
After the childless death of Ansel, the title of marshal of England passed onto his older sister Matilda Bigod, countess of Norfolk on 22 July 1246, when the heirs of the Marshal family paid homage to the king at Oxford. The title is still held today by the dukes of Norfolk. The vast Marshal inheritance in England, Wales and Ireland was formally divided in 1245 between Matilda and the children of her three younger sisters, who had all predeceased her.

The historian Matthew Paris addresses the rapid extinction of the Marshal lineage to a curse bestowed upon the family by the bishop of Ferns, Albin O'Molloy, after exactions on his diocese levied by William Marshal the elder. Paris claims that when Ansel and his brothers were in their prime, their mother Isabel had foretold that "all would be earls of the same county".

== Sources ==
- Acts and Letters of the Marshal Family 1156-1248: Earls of Pembroke and Marshals of England, ed. David Crouch, Camden Society 5th series, 47 (Cambridge: CUP, 2015).
- Cokayne, George E. (1945), The New Complete Peerage, vol. 10, St. Catherine Press Limited
- R.F. Walker, 'The Earls of Pembroke, 1138-1389' in, Pembrokeshire County History ii, Medieval Pembrokeshire, ed. R.F. Walker (Haverfordwest, 2002).
