= Robert Morley, 2nd Baron Morley =

English military and naval leader

Robert Morley, 2nd Baron
- Born: about 1295; England
- Died: 1360; France
- Military career
- Allegiance: Kingdom of England
- Service years: 1315 –1360
- Commands: Constable of the Tower of London; Admiral of the North
- Conflicts: Battle of Halidon Hill; Battle of Sluys; Battle of Crécy; Siege of Calais

Robert Morley, 2nd Baron Morley (about 1295 – 1360), was an English administrator and military leader who fought on land and sea in wars against Scotland, Castile, and France.

== Origins ==
Born in or before 1295, he was the son and heir of William Morley (died 1302), 1st Baron, and his first wife Isabel Mohaut (died 1295), sister and heir of Robert Mohaut (died 1329), 2nd Baron. His paternal grandfather was Robert Morley (died after 1288).

== Career ==
Taking up a military career, in 1315 and 1316 he served with the English forces in Scotland under his uncle Robert Mohaut, 1st Baron. First summoned to Parliament in 1317, he sat there as a baron for the rest of his life. In the rebellion of the Earl of Lancaster in 1322, he brought forces to the aid of King Edward II and, after the defeat of the rebels at Boroughbridge, took part in the defence of northern England against Scots invaders.

In 1326, at Bristol, he was a member of the council that declared for King Edward III in place of his father and early in 1327 at the Guildhall in London he took the oath to the new king. In that year he was appointed to the commission of the peace for Norfolk and Suffolk and for the rest of his life, when not away at war, sat on commissions in these and neighbouring counties. In 1331 he organised a tournament at Stepney, possibly to celebrate the first birthday of Edward the Black Prince, at which he and 24 companions challenged all comers. After fighting the Scots again at Halidon Hill in 1333, he ceded his inheritance from his uncle Robert Mohaut to the Queen Mother Isabella keeping only some lands in Suffolk. Though he planned a pilgrimage to Santiago de Compostela in 1335, it is not known if he made the trip, and in 1336 and 1337 he was on garrison duty at Perth.

As the government faced war with France and Castile, to his civil duties in Norfolk were added responsibilities for defence and he was not part of England's invasion forces in 1338. However, in 1339 he was appointed Admiral of the Northern Fleet and soon took action. After fighting off a French offensive on the Cinque Ports, he mounted successful attacks on the coast of Normandy, followed in 1340 by leading the English fleet to victory at Sluys. Owed 1,100 pounds by the government for his services, he accepted a lifetime's supply of venison instead. Staying in post until 1342; he took part that year in the expedition to Brittany.

After a tournament the following year at Smithfield, where he was dressed as the Pope and his twelve fellow-knights were cardinals, he joined the English army in France in 1345. There he fought at Crécy in 1346 and at Calais. During the siege of Calais, in which his fleet blockaded the port, a court of chivalry was convened to settle whether he or Sir Nicholas Burnell was entitled to bear the arms argent, a lion rampant sable, crowned and armed or. Some accounts say that King Edward III intervened in his favour. Reappointed to head the Northern Fleet in 1350, he fought the Castilian fleet off Winchelsea.

Reassigned to coastal defence of Norfolk in 1451, as a judge for the county he was responsible in 1354 for enforcing the Statute of Labourers, which attempted to regulate wages after the Black Death. In 1355 he was again appointed Admiral of the Northern Fleet and was also made Constable of the Tower of London, holding both posts for the rest of his life. Returning to the land war in France in 1359 with a retinue of sixty men-at-arms and archers, he died on 23 March 1360 in Burgundy.

== Family ==
His first marriage, in or before 1316, was to Hawise Marshal (died before 1327), daughter of his guardian William Marshal, 1st Baron Marshal (died 1314) and his wife Christine FitzWalter. Hawise, as the heir of her childless brother John Marshal (died 1316), 2nd Baron Marshal, brought him not only estates in England, mainly in Essex, Norfolk, and Hertfordshire, but also the hereditary title of Marshal of Ireland. They had a son, William Morley (born 1319), 3rd Baron Morley.

His second marriage, by September 1334, was to Joan (died 1358), possibly the daughter of Sir Peter Tyes, with whom he had two sons: Henry Morley (born about 1344), and Thomas Morley.
