= Earl Marshal =

UK royal officeholder and chivalric title

Earl Marshal of England
- Arms of the Dukes of Norfolk as Earl Marshal.

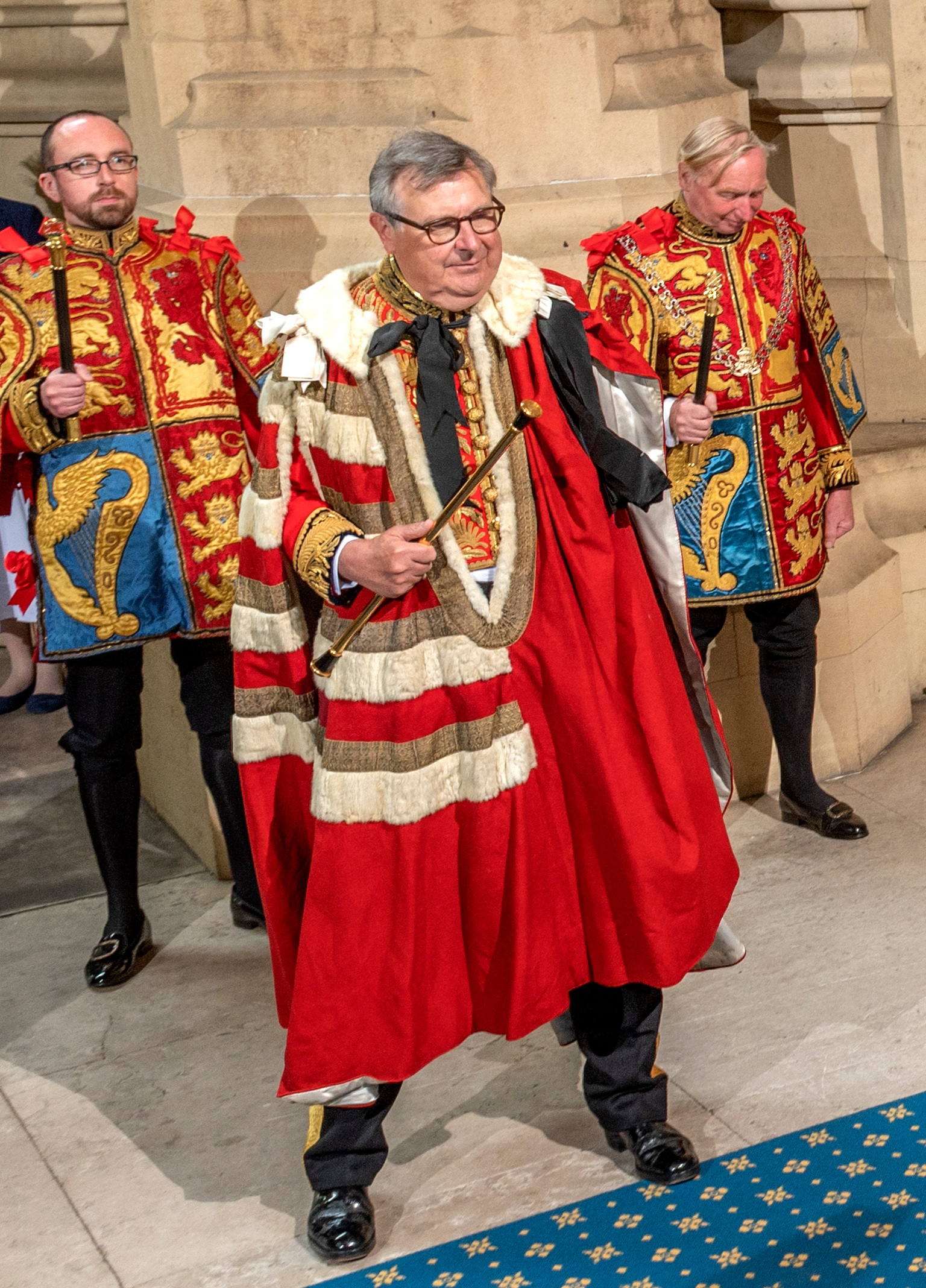
- Incumbent; The 18th Duke of Norfolk since 24 June 2002
- Style: His Grace The Most Noble
- Type: Great Officer of State
- Formation: 1672 (current office granted by Letters Patent)
- First holder: The 6th Duke of Norfolk (1672 creation)
- Succession: Hereditary
- Deputy: Deputy Earl Marshal; Knight Marshal (until 1846)

Earl Marshal (alternatively marschal or marischal) is a hereditary royal officeholder and chivalric title under the sovereign of the United Kingdom used in England (then, following the Act of Union 1800, in the United Kingdom). He is the eighth of the great officers of State in the United Kingdom, ranking beneath the Lord High Constable of England and above the Lord High Admiral. The dukes of Norfolk have held the office since 1672.

The current earl marshal is Edward Fitzalan-Howard, 18th Duke of Norfolk, who inherited the position in June 2002. There were formerly an Earl Marshal of Ireland and an Earl Marischal of Scotland.

== Duties ==
The earl marshal was originally responsible, along with the constable, for the monarch's horses and stables including connected military operations. As a result of the decline of chivalry and sociocultural change, the position of earl marshal has evolved and among his responsibilities today is the organisation of major ceremonial state occasions such as coronations in Westminster Abbey, state funerals, and prescribing the order of ceremony for state openings of Parliament. By virtue of office, the earl marshal is the leading officer of arms in England, Wales, Northern Ireland, and certain Commonwealth realms and thus oversees the College of Arms. Likewise, he is the sole judge of the High Court of Chivalry.

== History ==
The office of the royal marshal existed in much of Europe, involving managing horses and protecting the monarch. In England, the office became hereditary under John FitzGilbert the Marshal (served c.1130–1165) after The Anarchy, and rose in prominence under his second son, William Marshal, later Earl of Pembroke. He served under several kings, acted as regent, and organised funerals and the regency during Henry III's childhood. After passing through his daughter's husband to the Earls of Norfolk, the post evolved into "Earl Marshal" and the title remained unchanged, even after the earldom of Norfolk became a dukedom.

In the Middle Ages, the Earl Marshal and the Lord High Constable were the officers of the king's horses and stables. When chivalry declined in importance, the constable's post declined and the Earl Marshal became the head of the College of Arms, the body concerned with all matters of genealogy and heraldry. In conjunction with the Lord High Constable, he had held a court, known as the Court of Chivalry, for the administration of justice in accordance with the law of arms, which was concerned with many subjects relating to military matters, such as ransom, booty and soldiers' wages, and including the misuse of armorial bearings.

In 1672, the office of Marshal of England and the title of Earl Marshal of England were made hereditary in the Howard family. In a declaration made on 16 June 1673 by Arthur Annesley, 1st Earl of Anglesey, the Lord Privy Seal, in reference to a dispute over the exercise of authority over the Officers of Arms the powers of the Earl Marshal were stated as being "to have power to order, judge, and determine all matters touching arms, ensigns of nobility, honour, and chivalry; to make laws, ordinances and statutes for the good government of the Officers of Arms; to nominate Officers to fill vacancies in the College of Arms; [and] to punish and correct Officers of Arms for misbehaviour in the execution of their places". Additionally it was declared that no patents of arms or any ensigns of nobility should be granted, and no augmentation, alteration, or addition should be made to arms, without the consent of the Earl Marshal.

The Earl Marshal is considered the eighth of the Great Officers of State, with the Lord High Constable above him and only the Lord High Admiral beneath him. Nowadays, the Earl Marshal's role has mainly to do with the organisation of major state ceremonies such as coronations and state funerals. Annually, the Earl Marshal helps organise the State Opening of Parliament. The Earl Marshal also remains to have charge over the College of Arms and no coat of arms may be granted without his warrant. As a symbol of his office, he carries a baton of gold with black finish at either end.

In the general order of precedence, the Earl Marshal is currently the highest hereditary position in the United Kingdom outside the Royal Family. Although other state and ecclesiastical officers rank above in precedence, they are not hereditary. The exception is the office of Lord Great Chamberlain, which is notionally higher than Earl Marshal and also hereditary. The holding of the Earl Marshalship secures the Duke of Norfolk's traditional position as the "first peer" of the land, above all other dukes.

The House of Lords Act 1999 removed the automatic right of hereditary peers to sit in the House of Lords, but the act provided that the persons holding the office of Earl Marshal and, if a peer, the Lord Great Chamberlain continue for the time being to have seats so as to carry out their ceremonial functions in the House of Lords. Further reforms in the House of Lords (Hereditary Peers) Act 2026 removed the right to sit and vote from all remaining hereditary peers, while retaining the ceremonial functions of these two officeholders.

== Lords Marshal of England, 1135–1386 ==
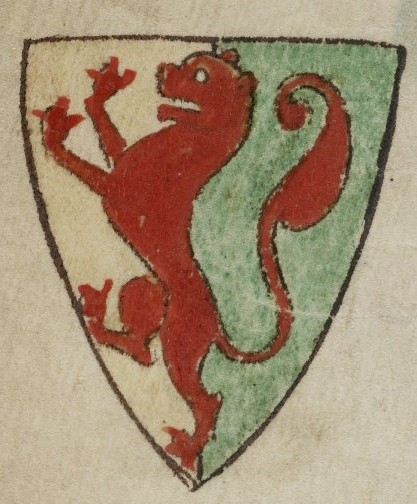
Depiction by Matthew Paris (d.1259) of the arms of William Marshal, 1st Earl of Pembroke (1194–1219): Party per pale or and vert, overall a lion rampant gules

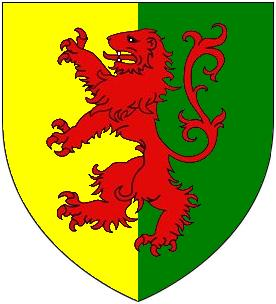
Arms of "Bigod Modern": Party per pale or and vert, overall a lion rampant gules, adopted by Roger Bigod, 5th Earl of Norfolk (1269–1306), after 1269 following his inheritance of the office of Marshal of England from the Marshal family

- Gilbert Giffard ?–1129 (?)
- John Fitz-Gilbert “the Marshal” 1130–1165 (?)
- John Marshal 1165–1194
- William Marshal, 1st Earl of Pembroke 1194–1219
- William Marshal, 2nd Earl of Pembroke 1219–1231
- Richard Marshal, 3rd Earl of Pembroke 1231–1234
- Gilbert Marshal, 4th Earl of Pembroke 1234–1241
- Walter Marshal, 5th Earl of Pembroke 1242–1245
- Anselm Marshal, 6th Earl of Pembroke 1245
- Roger Bigod, 4th Earl of Norfolk 1245–1269
- Roger Bigod, 5th Earl of Norfolk 1269–1306
- Robert de Clifford 1307–1308
- Nicholas Seagrave 1308–1316
- Thomas of Brotherton, 1st Earl of Norfolk 1316–1338
- William Montagu, 1st Earl of Salisbury 1338–1344
- Margaret, Duchess of Norfolk 1338–1377
- Henry Percy, Lord Percy 1377
- John FitzAlan, 1st Baron Arundel, Lord Maltravers 1377–1383 (died 1379)
- Thomas Mowbray, 1st Earl of Nottingham 1385–1386

== Earls Marshal of England, 1386–present ==
Earl Marshal	Term of office		Monarch
Thomas de Mowbray; 1st Duke of Norfolk	1386	1398	Richard II
Thomas Holland; 1st Duke of Surrey	1398	1399	Richard II
Ralph de Neville; 1st Earl of Westmorland	1400	1412	Henry IV
John de Mowbray; 2nd Duke of Norfolk	1412	1432	Henry IV
John de Mowbray; 2nd Duke of Norfolk	1412	1432	Henry V
John de Mowbray; 2nd Duke of Norfolk	1412	1432	Henry VI
John de Mowbray; 3rd Duke of Norfolk	1432	1461	Henry VI
John de Mowbray; 4th Duke of Norfolk	1461	1476	Edward IV
John de Mowbray; 4th Duke of Norfolk	1461	1476	Henry VI
John de Mowbray; 4th Duke of Norfolk	1461	1476	Edward IV
Jointly: Anne de Mowbray, 8th Countess of Norfolk 1476–1481; Richard of Shrewsbury, 1st Duke of York 1478–1483; Sir Thomas Grey (acting) 1476–1483	1476	1483	Edward IV
Jointly: Anne de Mowbray, 8th Countess of Norfolk 1476–1481; Richard of Shrewsbury, 1st Duke of York 1478–1483; Sir Thomas Grey (acting) 1476–1483	1476	1483	Edward V
John Howard; 1st Duke of Norfolk	1483	1485	Richard III
William de Berkeley; 1st Marquess of Berkeley	1486	1492	Henry VII
Lord Henry; Duke of York	1494	1509	Henry VII
Thomas Howard; 2nd Duke of Norfolk	1509	1524	Henry VIII
Charles Brandon; 1st Duke of Suffolk	1524	1533	Henry VIII
Thomas Howard; 3rd Duke of Norfolk	1533	1547	Henry VIII
Edward Seymour; 1st Duke of Somerset	1547	1551	Edward VI
John Dudley; 1st Duke of Northumberland	1551	1553	Edward VI
Thomas Howard; 3rd Duke of Norfolk	1553	1554	Mary I
Thomas Howard; 4th Duke of Norfolk	1554	1572	Mary I
Thomas Howard; 4th Duke of Norfolk	1554	1572	Elizabeth I
George Talbot; 6th Earl of Shrewsbury	1572	1590	Elizabeth I
In commission: William Cecil, 1st Baron Burghley; Charles Howard, 2nd Baron Howard of Effingham	1590	1597	Elizabeth I
Robert Devereux; 2nd Earl of Essex	1597	1601	Elizabeth I
In commission	1602	1603	Elizabeth I
Edward Somerset; 4th Earl of Worcester	1603	1603	James I
In commission: Thomas Sackville, 1st Earl of Dorset; Ludovic Stewart, 2nd Duke of Lennox; Thomas Howard, 1st Earl of Suffolk; Edward Somerset, 4th Earl of Worcester; Henry Howard, 1st Earl of Northampton; Charles Howard, 1st Earl of Nottingham; Charles Blount, 1st Earl of Devon	1604	1616	James I
In commission: Edward Somerset, 4th Earl of Worcester; Ludovic Stewart, 2nd Duke of Lennox; George Villiers, 1st Duke of Buckingham; Charles Howard, 1st Earl of Nottingham; William Herbert, 3rd Earl of Pembroke	1616	1622	James I
Thomas Howard; Earl of Arundel and Surrey	1622	1646	James I
Thomas Howard; Earl of Arundel and Surrey	1622	1646	Charles I
Henry Howard; Earl of Arundel and Surrey	1646	1652	Charles I
Vacant	1652	1661	Interregnum
James Howard; 3rd Earl of Suffolk	1661	1662	Charles II
In commission: Thomas Wriothesley, 4th Earl of Southampton; John Robartes, 1st Baron Robartes; Henry Pierrepont, 1st Marquess of Dorchester; Montagu Bertie, 2nd Earl of Lindsey; Edward Montagu, 2nd Earl of Manchester; Algernon Percy, 10th Earl of Northumberland	1662	1672	Charles II
Henry Howard; 6th Duke of Norfolk	1672	1684	Charles II
Henry Howard; 7th Duke of Norfolk	1684	1701	Charles II
Henry Howard; 7th Duke of Norfolk	1684	1701	James II
Henry Howard; 7th Duke of Norfolk	1684	1701	Mary II William III
Thomas Howard; 8th Duke of Norfolk	1701	1732	Mary II William III
Thomas Howard; 8th Duke of Norfolk	1701	1732	Anne
Thomas Howard; 8th Duke of Norfolk	1701	1732	George I
Thomas Howard; 8th Duke of Norfolk	1701	1732	George II
Edward Howard; 9th Duke of Norfolk	1732	1777	George II
Edward Howard; 9th Duke of Norfolk	1732	1777	George III
Charles Howard; 10th Duke of Norfolk	1777	1786	George III
Charles Howard; 11th Duke of Norfolk	1786	1815	George III
Bernard Edward Howard; 12th Duke of Norfolk	1815	1842	George III
Bernard Edward Howard; 12th Duke of Norfolk	1815	1842	George IV
Bernard Edward Howard; 12th Duke of Norfolk	1815	1842	William IV
Bernard Edward Howard; 12th Duke of Norfolk	1815	1842	Victoria
Henry Charles Howard; 13th Duke of Norfolk	1842	1856	Victoria
Henry Granville Fitzalan-Howard; 14th Duke of Norfolk	1856	1860	Victoria
Henry Fitzalan-Howard; 15th Duke of Norfolk	1860	1917	Victoria
Henry Fitzalan-Howard; 15th Duke of Norfolk	1860	1917	Edward VII
Henry Fitzalan-Howard; 15th Duke of Norfolk	1860	1917	George V
Bernard Marmaduke Fitzalan-Howard; 16th Duke of Norfolk	1917	1975	George V
Bernard Marmaduke Fitzalan-Howard; 16th Duke of Norfolk	1917	1975	Edward VIII
Bernard Marmaduke Fitzalan-Howard; 16th Duke of Norfolk	1917	1975	George VI
Bernard Marmaduke Fitzalan-Howard; 16th Duke of Norfolk	1917	1975	Elizabeth II
Miles Fitzalan-Howard; 17th Duke of Norfolk	1975	2002	Elizabeth II
Edward William Fitzalan-Howard; 18th Duke of Norfolk	2002	Incumbent	Elizabeth II
Edward William Fitzalan-Howard; 18th Duke of Norfolk	2002	Incumbent	Charles III

== Deputy Earls Marshal of England ==
The position of Earl Marshal had a Deputy called the Knight Marshal from the reign of Henry VIII until the office was abolished in 1846.

Deputy Earls Marshal have been named at various times, discharging the responsibilities of the office during the minority or infirmity of the Earl Marshal. Prior to an Act of Parliament in 1824, Protestant deputies were required when the Earl Marshal was a Roman Catholic, which occurred frequently due to the Catholicism of the Norfolks.

Name	Tenure	Deputy to	Ref(s)
Charles Howard, 1st Earl of Carlisle	1673–?		
Charles Howard, 3rd Earl of Carlisle	1701–1706		
Henry Howard, 6th Earl of Suffolk and 1st Earl of Bindon	1706–1718		
Henry Bowes-Howard, 4th Earl of Berkshire	1718–1725		
Talbot Yelverton, 1st Earl of Sussex	1725–1731		
Francis Howard, 1st Earl of Effingham	1731–1743		
Thomas Howard, 2nd Earl of Effingham	1743–1763		
Henry Howard, 12th Earl of Suffolk and 5th Earl of Berkshire	1763–1765		
Richard Lumley-Saunderson, 4th Earl of Scarbrough	1765–1777		
Thomas Howard, 3rd Earl of Effingham	1777–1782		
Charles Howard, Earl of Surrey	1782–1786		
Lord Henry Howard-Molyneux-Howard	1816–1824	12th Duke of Norfolk	
Lord Edward Fitzalan-Howard	1861–1868	15th Duke of Norfolk	
Edmund FitzAlan-Howard, 1st Viscount FitzAlan of Derwent	1917–1929	16th Duke of Norfolk	
Edward Howard, Earl of Arundel and Surrey	2000–2002	17th Duke of Norfolk	

== See also ==
- Lord Lyon King of Arms
- Earl Marischal of Scotland
- Earl Marshal of Ireland
