= James Vernon (historian) =

British and American historian (born 1965)

James Vernon (born March 2, 1965) is a British and American historian and Helen Fawcett Distinguished Professor emeritus at the University of California, Berkeley.

== Early life ==
Vernon was born March 2, 1965, in England. Vernon began undergraduate studies at the University of Manchester in 1984 and continued on there to earn a Ph.D.

== Career ==
Vernon became a professor at the University of Manchester after finishing his Ph.D. and remained there until 2000, when he was appointed professor of history at the University of California, Berkeley. At Berkeley, he rose to a named chair, the Helen Fawcett Distinguished Professor, and retired in 2025.

His teaching has focused on global history and British history. Vernon is noted for his books on 19th century British history, on the history of hunger, and for his attention to questions related to the cultural turn and postcolonialism.

== Publications ==
Monographs

- Politics and the People. A Study in English Political Culture, 1815–1867. Cambridge: Cambridge University Press, 1993 (Paperback 2009)
- Hunger. A Modern History. Cambridge, MA: Harvard University Press, 2007
- Distant Strangers. How Britain Became Modern. Berkeley, CA: University of California Press, 2014
- Modern Britain, 1750 to the Present (volume 4 in Cambridge History of Britain series). Cambridge: Cambridge University Press, 2017; revised edition 2025.
