= Earl Marshal of Ireland =

Hereditary office in Ireland

Marshal of Ireland or Earl Marshal of Ireland is a hereditary title originally awarded to William Marshal, 1st Earl of Pembroke in the Lordship of Ireland, which descended to Baron Morley. The title of Marshal, like that of Baron Morley, has been in abeyance since 1697. William Lynch in 1830 described the duties attached to the office before it became ceremonial:

Besides the duties which seemed to have been exercised by the Marshal of England, there were some other public services of great trust and consequence which devolved on the Marshal of Ireland. This appears from entries on the rolls of King John and Henry the Third, whereby we find that under the Marshal's care and superintendence were placed all the castles and fortresses, not only of the King, but of all minors and others whose estates were in the hands of the Crown : these he was bound to inspect and have always duly guarded and munitioned. The Marshal also in Ireland with the King's Justiciary laid out the bounds, and assigned the districts or territories granted to the Barons by the King, and exercised many other high functions, as will appear on reference to those rolls.

== List ==
Holders of the title include:

- William Marshal, 1st Earl of Pembroke (died 1219)
- John Marshal (died 1235) (illegitimate son of John Marshal, brother of the above William Marshal, who died in 1194) was granted the office by King John 12 November 1207.
- William Marshal 'who joined the Barons against King Henry III and d. 1264' (grandson of the last-mentioned John Marshal)
- John Marshal, son of the last-mentioned. His son next-mentioned succeeded him in 1284.
- William Marshal, 1st Baron Marshal (died 1314), son of the last-mentioned, quoting
- John Marshal, 2nd Baron Marshal (died 1316/17), son of the last-mentioned
- Robert de Morley, 2nd Baron Morley (died 1360) "having married Hawyse, sister and heir to John le Mareschall, of Hengham, in [the County of Norfolk] had livery of the lands of her inheritance, the 10th of Edward II. Which Hawyse held the office of marshal of Ireland by descent."
- William de Morley, 3rd Baron Morley (died 1379) "the 38th of Edward III. had licence to travel beyond sea, as also to grant his office of mareschall of Ireland (which had descended to him by his mother), to Henry de Ferrers, to hold so long as he behaved himself well therein."
- Thomas de Morley, 4th Baron Morley (died 1416)
- Thomas de Morley, 5th Baron Morley (died 1435)

The Barony of Morley was held by his descendants until it fell into abeyance in 1697.

== Abeyance ==
The representatives are among the issue of the final (15th) Baron Morley's aunt or aunts, viz

1. Elizabeth who m. Edward Cranfield of whose issue (if any) nothing is known; and
2. Katharine (the 1st da.), who m. as his first wife John Savage, 2nd Earl Rivers, who died on 10 October 1654, leaving by her three sons and five daughters. The issue of all the sons became extinct (with the Earldom of Rivers), in 1728, while two of the daughters died without issue. Of the three other daughters of the Countess Rivers
  1. Lady Jane Savage, is represented by her issue by her third husband George Pitt, of whom were the Barons Rivers, extinct 1880,
  2. Lady Catherine, by her second husband, was represented by the Earls of Portmore, extinct 1835; and
  3. Lady Mary married (as his first wife), Henry Killigrew, Groom of the Bedchamber, by whom she had a son, James, living March 1682/3, who is said to have died without issue.

== Sources ==
- Banks, Thomas Christopher (1807). The dormant and extinct baronage of England; or, An historical and genealogical account of the lives, public employments, and most memorable actions of the English nobility who have flourished from the Norman conquest. London: J. White. pp. 356–357.
- Cokayne, George Edward (1887). Complete peerage of England, Scotland, Ireland, Great Britain and the United Kingdom. Vol. V. London: G. Bell.
- Lynch, William (1830). A view of the legal institutions, honorary hereditary offices, and feudal baronies, established ... London: Longman, Rees, Orme, Brown and Green. pp. 71–75.
- Morrin, James (1861). "Unpublished statute entered on the Chancery Roll, Dublin, in the year 1460, relative to the independence of Ireland". Calendar of the patent and close rolls of chancery in Ireland, of the reigns of Henry VIII., Edward VI., Mary, and Elizabeth. Dublin: A. Thom for HMSO. p. xxxviii.
- Round, John Horace (1911). "Family Tree of the Marshal family". The king's serjeants & officers of state, with their coronation services. London: J. Nisbet. p. 368.
