= High Court of Chivalry =

English civil law court

His Majesty's High Court of Chivalry
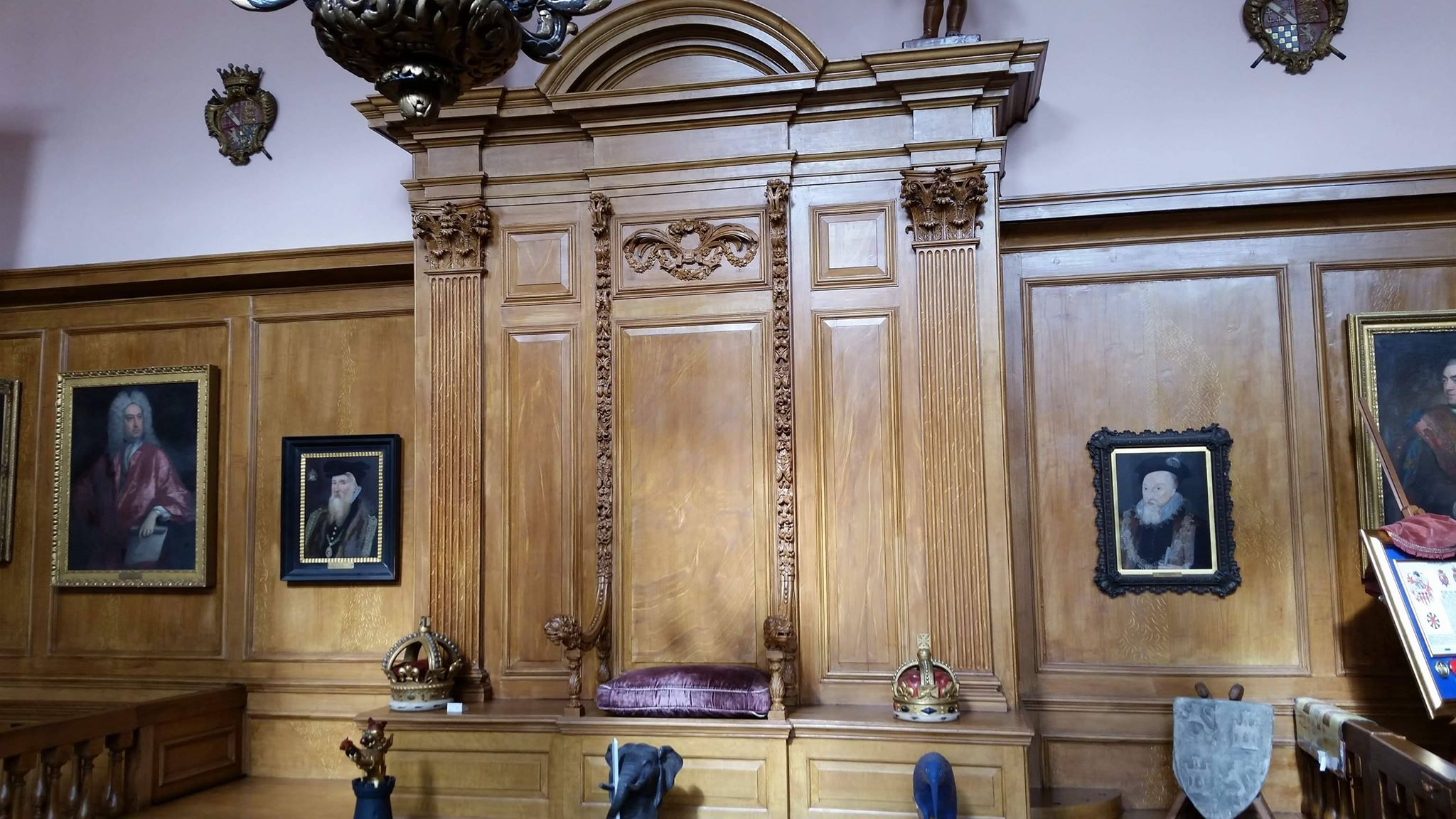
- Courtroom in October 2017
- Jurisdiction: England and Wales
- Composition method: Appointed by Earl Marshal
- Appeals to: Judicial Committee of the Privy Council
- Judge term length: One hereditary, otherwise depends on the appointment

Earl Marshal
- Currently: Duke of Norfolk
- Since: 1672 (current office granted by Letters Patent)

His Majesty's High Court of Chivalry, also known as the Court of Chivalry, is a court in the English and Welsh legal system which has jurisdiction over matters of heraldry. The court has been in existence since the fourteenth century; however, it rarely sits. The sole judge is now the holder of the hereditary office of Earl Marshal of England, the Duke of Norfolk. While the Earl Marshal may sit as a judge of the court himself, if he is not a professional lawyer he would typically appoint a professional lawyer as his lieutenant or surrogate to hear and decide a case brought to the court — in recent times, the Lord Chief Justice has been so appointed.

In Scotland, these types of cases are heard in the similar but separate Court of the Lord Lyon, which is a standing court with its own judge, the Lord Lyon King of Arms, and its own procurator fiscal (public prosecutor). It forms part of the Scottish legal system.

== History ==
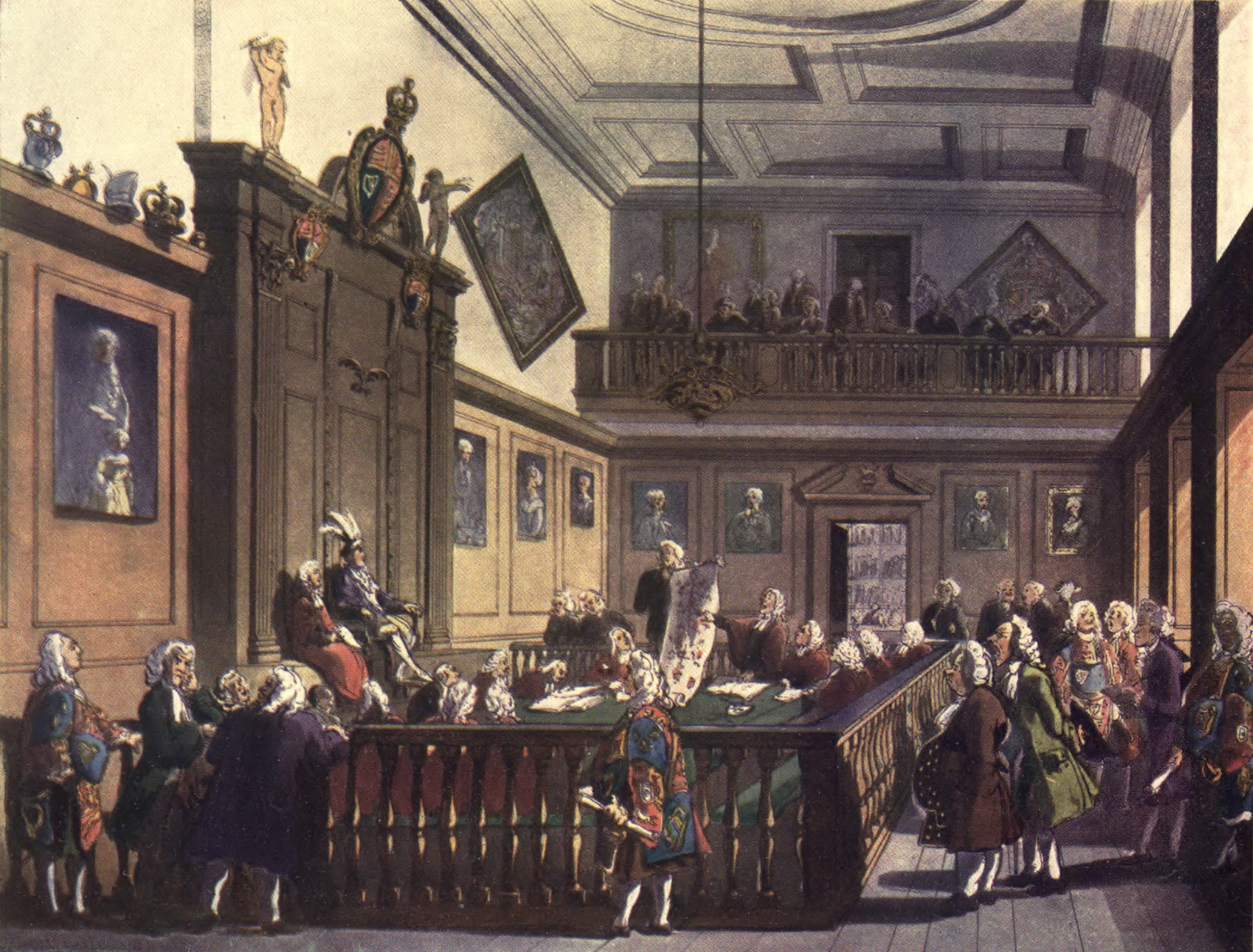
A session of the Court of Chivalry being held in the College of Arms, depicted in 1809.

The court was historically known as the Curia Militaris, the Court of the Constable and the Marshal, or the Earl Marshal's Court. The court was established some time prior to the late fourteenth century with jurisdiction over certain military matters, which came to include misuse of arms. It was instituted by Edward III, along with the Earl and other key personnel.

Since it was created in the fourteenth century, the court has always sat when required, except for the short time between 1634 and its temporary abolition by the Long Parliament in 1640 when it sat on a regular basis. During this time, the court heard well over a thousand cases, of which evidence survives from 738 cases.

Its jurisdiction and powers were successively reduced by the common law courts to the point where, after 1737, the court ceased to be convened and was in time regarded as obsolete and no longer in existence. That understanding was authoritatively overturned, however, by a revival of the court in 1954, when the Earl Marshal appointed the then Lord Chief Justice to sit as his surrogate. The Lord Chief Justice (Lord Goddard) confirmed that the court retained both its existence and its powers, and ruled upon the law suit brought before the court.

== Jurisdiction and recent cases ==
The court was last convened in 1954 to hear the case of Manchester Corporation v Manchester Palace of Varieties Ltd. Prior to this, the court had not sat for two centuries (since 1737). So, before hearing the case, the court first had to rule upon whether it still existed. The proceedings opened with the reading of various letters patent in order to make clear that the Duke of Norfolk was indeed hereditary Earl Marshal and that he had appointed Lord Goddard, who was the Lord Chief Justice of England and Wales, as his lieutenant in the court. The court also ruled that the Earl Marshal was able to sit in judgment without the Lord High Constable of England, an office which until 1521 was also held as a hereditary dignity by the Dukes of Buckingham.

The substance of the case itself was that the Palace Theatre had been displaying the arms of the Manchester Corporation (now the Manchester City Council) both inside its premises and upon its seal. The corporation claimed that such display implied a link between the (private) theatre and the city's government, and so it sought relief from the court in the form of an order to stop the use of the arms by and in the theatre. The corporation had previously requested that the theatre stop using the corporation's arms, but this request had been refused, and so it brought suit. The court ruled in favour of the corporation.

== Appeals from the court ==
In 1832, the Privy Council Appeals Act 1832 made the Privy Council the appellate court in cases heard by the High Court of Chivalry. Though the court had by then long been dormant, it still existed de jure or formally in law, and Parliament legislated for it on that basis. Since 1 February 1833, following the passage of the Judicial Committee Act 1833, appeals were to be heard by the Judicial Committee of the Privy Council. Prior to that (and similarly to the admiralty and ecclesiastical courts), appeals from the Court of Chivalry were made to the Crown in Chancery. Under this system, appeals were heard by commissioners appointed by letters patent under the Great Seal in each case. Sittings by these commissioners had become known as the High Court of Delegates by the time of the 1832 Act.

Following the commencement of the UK Supreme Court, as ultimate court of appeal for the UK, appeals presumably are taken from the High Court of Chivalry to the UKSC.

== Members and officers of the court ==
=== Judges ===
Historically the court had two hereditary judges — the Duke of Norfolk as Earl Marshal of England, and the Duke of Buckingham as Lord High Constable of England — but in 1521 Edward Stafford, 3rd Duke of Buckingham was convicted of treason, stripped of his titles and offices, and executed. Since then the office of Lord High Constable of England has only been appointed to perform ceremonial duties during a Coronation and this has meant only the Earl Marshal is extant as a judge of the court at any particular time.

=== Lieutenant, Assessor and Surrogate to the Earl Marshal ===
- Sir Edmund Isham, 6th Baronet — 1728–1772.
- Rayner Goddard, Baron Goddard — 24 October 1954–1959.
- George Drewry Squibb, Norfolk Herald of Arms Extraordinary — 1976–1994.

=== Joint Register to the High Court of Chivalry ===
- Lieutenant-Colonel Sir Anthony Wagner, Garter Principal King of Arms — 27 October 1954–1995.
- Wilfred Maurice Phillips (Notary Public), 27 October 1954.

=== Cryer to the High Court of Chivalry ===
- A. H. Smith — 1954.

== See also ==
- Canadian Heraldic Authority
- Chivalry
- Courts of England and Wales
- Law of Arms
- Scrope v Grosvenor
- Time immemorial
- Warbelton v Gorges
