= Carlow Castle =

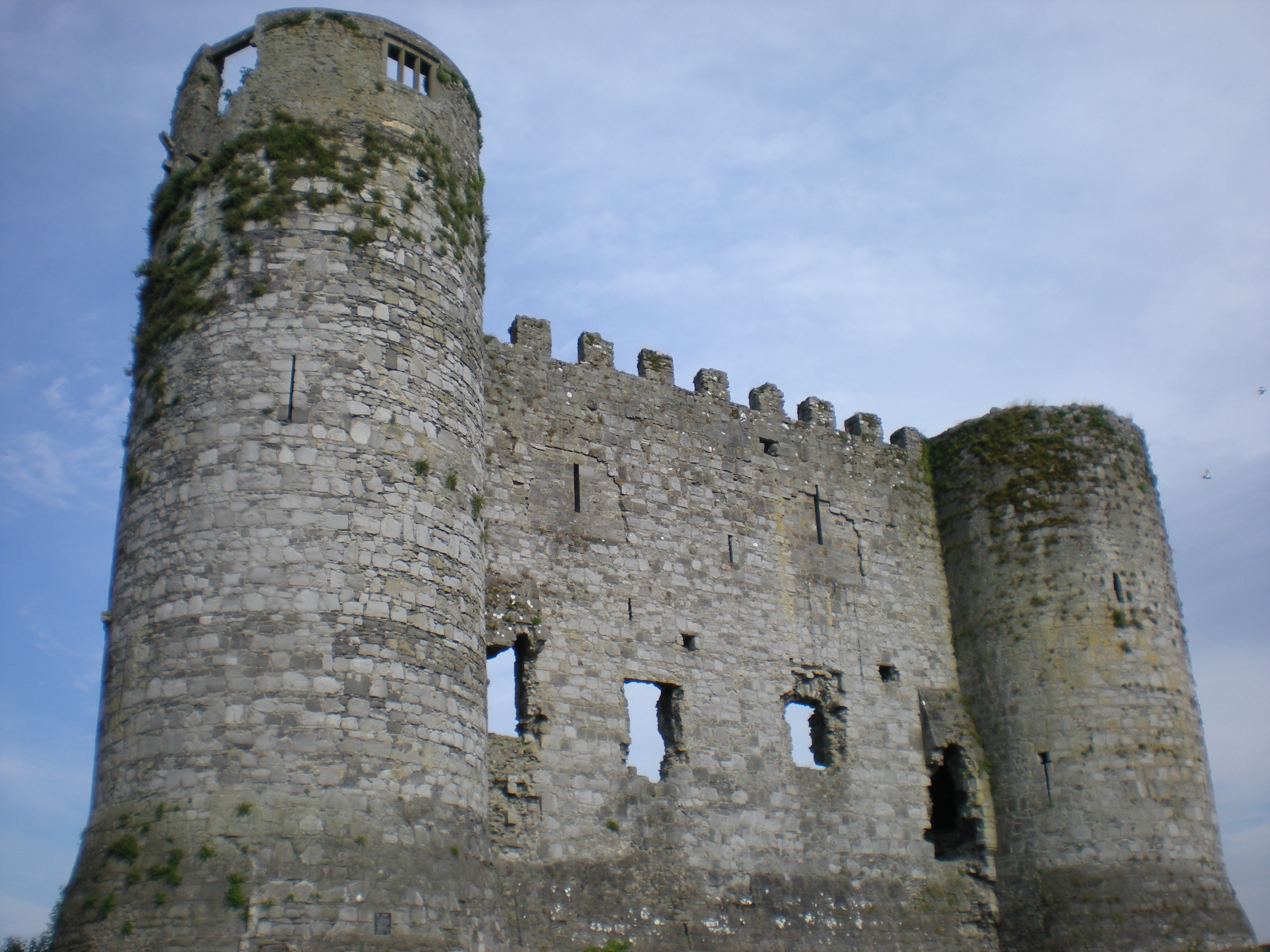
- Carlow Castle

- Location within Ireland
- 52°50′11″N 6°56′09″W
- Location: Carlow, County Carlow, Ireland

History
- Built: 1207–1213

Site notes
- Architect: William Marshall

National monument of Ireland
- Official name: Carlow Castle
- Reference no.: 306

Carlow Castle (Irish: Caisleán Cheatharlach) is located near the River Barrow in County Carlow, Ireland. It was built between 1207 and 1213, and is a National Monument of Ireland.

== History and Architecture ==
The earliest written record of this castle is from 1231 but it does not name its builder. It is widely assumed that the castle was built by William Marshal the elder in the time period between 1207 and 1213 which he spent in Ireland. The castle in Carlow was the very first of its kind in Ireland, a towered keep, where a huge rectangular tower is surrounded by four smaller three-quarter-circular towers at the corners of the rectangle. However, there have been doubts that the castle in Carlow supported the traditional function of a keep, i. e. to serve as a refuge of last resort. Instead it deliberately diverted from the contemporary standard in England and continental Europe as there is no towered curtain, no gate house, and no undivided great hall. Similar castles of the same period were erected in Ferns, Lea, and Terryglass.

The inner castle measured 16 by 9.2 metres (52 ft × 30 ft), the towers had a diameter of 4.6 metres (15 ft), and the walls were 2.7 metres (9 ft) thick. The inner castle had three storeys and timber was used for the upper storeys. The long west wall provided stairways and two latrines. The latter indicates that the space was divided. The entrance door was in the first floor but is now broken out.

The castle was handed over to the crown in 1306, granted in 1312 to Thomas Plantagenet, confiscated by the crown in 1537 as the landlords were absent, bought by the Earl of Thomond in 1616, changed hands multiple times until it was taken by Oliver Cromwell in 1650 but was later returned to the Earl of Thomond. In 1814 the castle was mostly destroyed with explosves in an attempt to create more space for a lunatic asylum. Just the outer face of the west wall and the two neighbouring towers were preserved.

== Literature ==
- Leask, Harold G. (1941). Irish Castles and Castellated Houses. Dundalk: W. Tempest, Dundalgan Press.
- McNeill, Tom (1997). Castles in Ireland. London: Routledge. ISBN 0-415-16537-7.

== See also ==
- Castles in Great Britain and Ireland
- List of castles in Ireland
