= William Marshal, 1st Earl of Pembroke =

Anglo-Norman soldier and statesman (1146/7–1219)

William Marshal
- Earl of Pembroke; Governor of the King and of the Kingdom
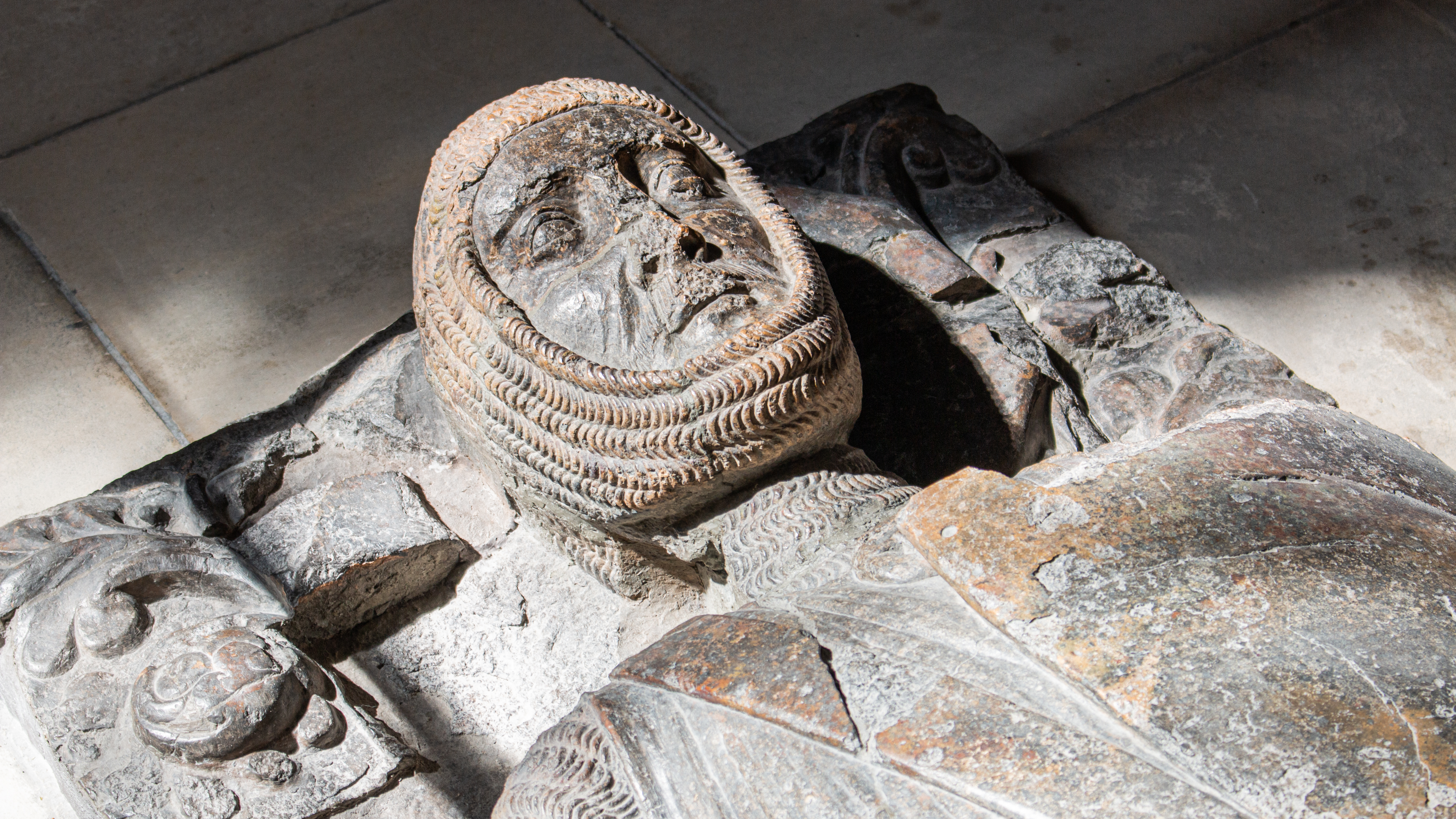
- Possible tomb effigy of William Marshal in Temple Church, London
- Born: 1146 or 1147
- Died: 14 May 1219 (aged 72–73); Caversham, Oxfordshire, (Note: Although now in Berkshire, Caversham was historically in Oxfordshire) England
- Buried: Temple Church, London
- Noble family: Marshal
- Spouse: Isabel de Clare (m. 1189)
- Issue: William Marshal, 2nd Earl of Pembroke; Richard Marshal, 3rd Earl of Pembroke; Maud Marshal; Gilbert Marshal, 4th Earl of Pembroke; Walter Marshal, 5th Earl of Pembroke; Anselm Marshal, 6th Earl of Pembroke; Isabel Marshal; Sibyl Marshal; Joan Marshal; Eva Marshal
- Father: John Marshal
- Mother: Sybilla of Salisbury

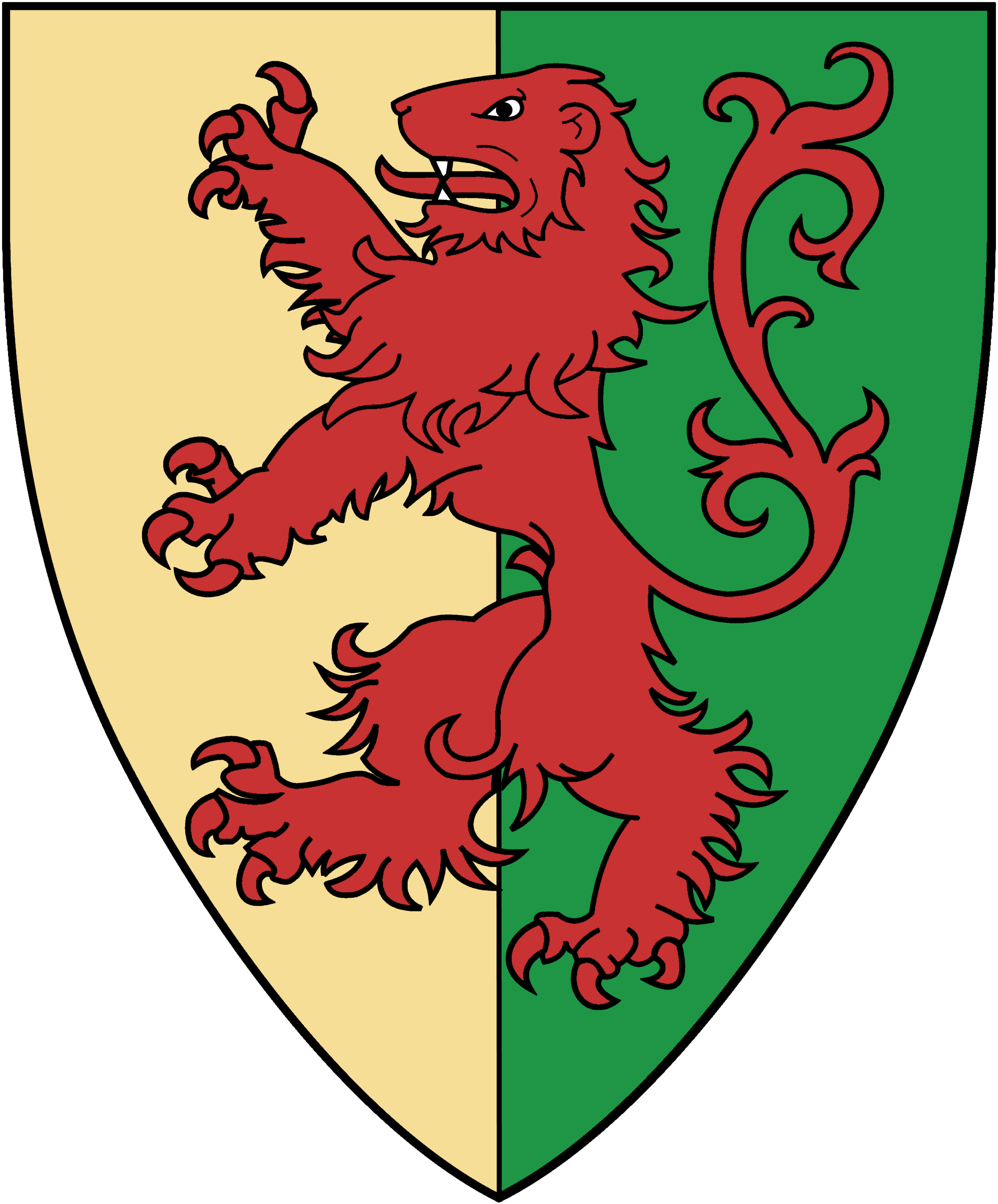
Arms of William Marshal

William Marshal, 1st Earl of Pembroke (1146 or 1147 – 14 May 1219), also called William the Marshal (Norman French: Williame li Mareschal, French: Guillaume le Maréchal), was an Anglo-Norman soldier and statesman during High Medieval England who served five English kings—Henry II and his son and co-ruler Young Henry, Richard I, John, and Henry III—as a royal adviser and agent, and as a warrior of outstanding prowess.

Knighted in 1166, William spent his younger years as a successful competitor in military tournaments; 13th-century chronicler Stephen Langton eulogises him as the "best knight that ever lived." In 1189, he became earl of Pembroke through his marriage to Isabel de Clare, whose parents were Aoife MacMurrough and Richard de Clare, 2nd Earl of Pembroke. The title of earl was not officially granted until 1199 and is considered to be the second creation of the Pembroke earldom. In 1216 upon the death of King John, William was appointed protector for John's nine-year-old son Henry III and rector regis et regni (Latin for "governor of the king and of the kingdom"). Just before his death, William fulfilled a promise he said he made in his youth while on crusade by taking vows as a Knight Templar, and was buried in the Temple Church in London.

Before William, his father's family held a hereditary title of Marshal to the King, which by his father's time had become recognised as a chief or master marshalcy, involving management over other marshals and functionaries. William became known as "the Marshal", although by his time much of the function was delegated to more specialised representatives (as happened with other functions in the king's household). Because he was an earl, and also known as the marshal, the term "earl marshal" was commonly used, and this later became an established hereditary title in the English peerage.

== Early life ==
William was born in 1146 or 1147, the second son of Anglo-Norman nobleman John Marshal and his wife Sybilla of Salisbury. The exact date of William's birth is unknown, but it took place somewhere in Wiltshire or Berkshire at one of his father's estates or castles.

John had supported King Stephen when Stephen took the throne in 1135, but in about 1139 had changed sides to support the rival claimant Empress Matilda in her war of succession against Stephen, which led to the collapse of England into a 15-year civil war known as "the Anarchy". When Stephen besieged Newbury Castle in 1152, according to William's biographer, he used the young William as a hostage to ensure that John kept his promise to surrender the castle. John, however, used the time allotted to reinforce the castle and to alert Matilda's forces. When Stephen ordered John to surrender, threatening that William would be hanged, John replied that he should go ahead, saying, "I still have the hammer and the anvil with which to forge still more and better sons!"

Subsequently, a pretence was made to launch William from a pierrière (a type of trebuchet) towards the castle, but Stephen could not bring himself to harm young William. William remained a crown hostage for many months and was released following the peace resulting from the terms agreed at Winchester on 6 November 1153, by which the civil war was ended.

== Knight ==
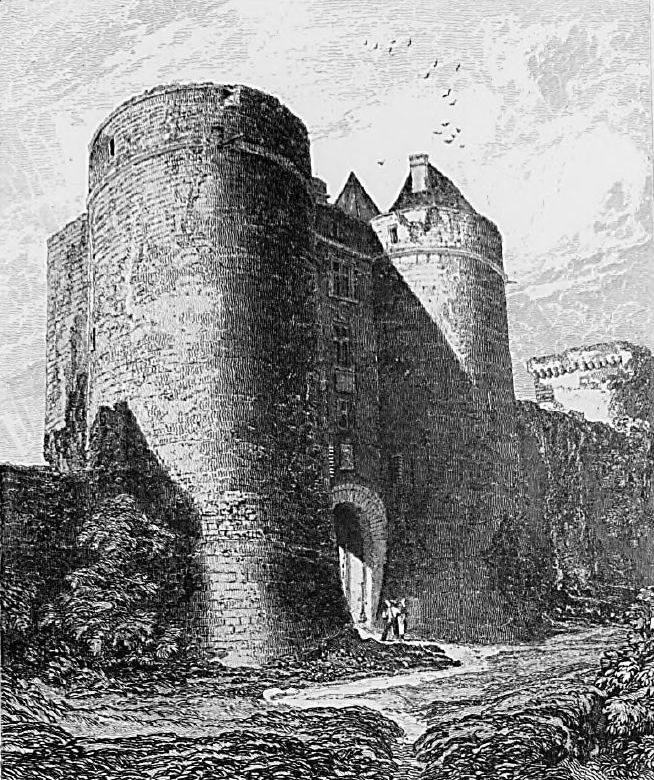
The Château de Tancarville in Normandy, where William Marshal began his training as a knight

As a younger son of a minor nobleman, William had no lands or fortune to inherit and had to make his own way in life. Around age 12, when his father's career was faltering, he was sent to the Château de Tancarville in Normandy to be brought up in the household of William de Tancarville, a great magnate and cousin of William's mother. Here he began his training as a knight. This would have included horsemanship, rigorous practice in the use of sword and lance, biblical stories, Latin prayers, and exposure to French romance literature to confer precepts of chivalry upon the future knight. In Tancarville's household he is also likely to have learned practical lessons in the politics of courtly life. According to his 13th-century biography, L'Histoire de Guillaume le Marechal, Marshal had enemies at Tancarville's court who plotted against him—presumably men threatened by his close relationship with the magnate.

In 1166, William was knighted on campaign in Upper Normandy, which was invaded from Flanders. His first experience in battle received mixed reviews. According to L'Histoire, everyone who witnessed William in combat agreed that he had acquitted himself well. However, as medieval historian David Crouch remarks, "War in the twelfth century was not fought wholly for honour. Profit was there to be made..." In this regard William was not so successful, as he was unable to translate his combat victories into profit from either ransom or seized booty. L'Histoire relates that the earl of Essex, expecting the customary tribute from his valorous knight after the battle, jokingly remarked: "Oh? But Marshal, what are you saying? You had forty or sixty of them—yet you refuse me so small a thing!"

In 1167, William was sponsored by William de Tancarville in his first tournament, where he found his true calling and began to develop skills that later made him a tournament champion. Tournaments were dangerous, often deadly, staged battles in which money and valuable prizes were to be won by capturing and ransoming opponents, their horses and armour. William became a legendary tournament champion, and on his deathbed recalled besting 500 knights during his tournament career.

In 1168 William served in the household of his mother's brother, Patrick, Earl of Salisbury. Later that year Patrick was escorting Queen Eleanor on a journey near the boundary of her province of Aquitaine and Marshal was part of the escort. They were ambushed by Guy de Lusignan who was trying to capture Eleanor. Although Eleanor escaped unharmed, Patrick was killed; William was wounded in the thigh and was taken prisoner and conveyed to a Lusignan castle to be held for ransom. Someone at the castle took pity on William because it is told that he received a loaf of bread in which were concealed several lengths of clean linen bandages with which to dress his wounds. This act of kindness by an unknown person perhaps saved William's life as infection of the wound could have killed him. After a period of time, he was ransomed by Eleanor, who was apparently impressed by tales of his bravery. He remained a member of Eleanor's household for the next two years, taking part in tournaments and the pacification of rebellion in Aquitaine, increasing his reputation as a chivalrous knight and rising high in the queen's favour.

== Service to Young King Henry ==
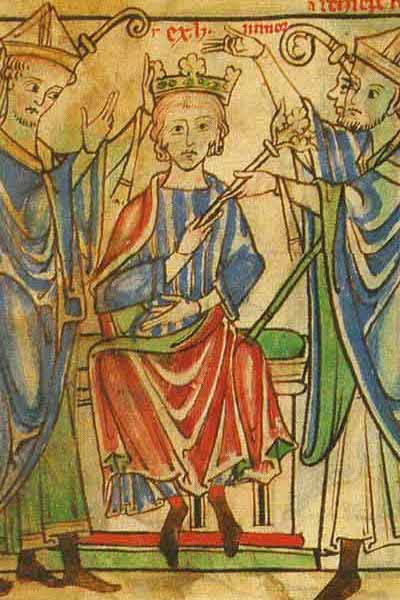
Detail of the coronation of Henry the Young King, from the Becket Leaves, by or after Matthew Paris.

In 1170, Henry II appointed William as tutor-in-arms to his son, Henry the Young King. During the Revolt of 1173–1174 led by the Young King, little is known of William's specific activities besides his loyalty to Young Henry. After the failed rebellion, Young Henry and his retinue, including William, travelled with Henry II for 18 months before receiving permission to travel to Europe to participate in knightly tournaments. William followed the Young King, and from 1176 to 1182 both men gained wealth and prestige from winning tournaments.

In late 1182 William was accused of having an affair with Young Henry's wife, Margaret of France. Historian Thomas Asbridge states that while the affair very strongly appears to have been fabricated by William's political enemies within the Young King's service, it cannot be proven either way. David Crouch suggests that the charge of adultery was invented in L'Histoire as a distraction from the real charges of lèse-majesté, of which he was more likely guilty—William used a battle cry very similar to the royal one, and was accused of being disloyal to his master in tournaments. According to L'Histoire, William appeared at Christmas court in Caen where he asked for trial by combat against his accusers in order to prove his innocence, but this was refused. William had left the Young King's service by early 1183, going into temporary exile after being granted letters of safe conduct by Henry II. Finding himself without a lord for the first time in many years, William received offers from Philip I of Flanders and Hugh III of Burgundy to secure his services and also took a pilgrimage to Cologne.

Young Henry declared war against his brother Richard in January 1183, with Henry II siding with Richard. By May, William had been cleared of all charges against the Young King and returned to his service. However, the Young King became sick and died on 11 June 1183. On his deathbed, the Young King asked William to fulfil the vow the Young King had made in 1182 to take up the cross and undertake a crusade to the Holy Land, and after receiving Henry II's blessing William left for Jerusalem in late 1183. Nothing is known of his activities during the two years he was gone, except that he fulfilled Young Henry's vow and secretly committed to joining the Knights Templar on his deathbed. Historians disagree about why his time on crusade received no coverage in the otherwise-detailed History of William Marshal. Georges Duby believes it was at William's own discretion, perhaps relating to his having joined the Templars. Thomas Asbridge examined the complex circumstances in the Latin East at the time of William's journey, and concludes that even if he had taken part in military engagements, like the relief of Kerak in 1184 or King Guy of Lusignan's attack on the Bedouin in Sinai the same year, these battles might not have been worth recounting. Nicholas Paul has suggested that stories surrounding William's crusade by the time of the composition of the History of William Marshal may, on the contrary, have been considered too outlandish by the author.

== Royal favour ==
The surviving church of Cartmel Priory, Cumbria (the windows and tower are later replacements).

After his return from the Holy Land in late 1185 or early 1186, William rejoined the court of King Henry II and served as a loyal captain through the many difficulties of Henry's final years. The returns of royal favour were almost immediate. The king gave William the large royal estate of Cartmel in Cumbria and the keeping of Heloise, the heiress of the northern barony of Lancaster. It may be that the king expected him to take the opportunity to marry her and become a northern baron, but William seems to have had grander ambitions for his marriage.

In 1188, faced with an attempt by Philip II to seize the disputed region of Berry, Henry summoned William to his side. The letter by which he did this survives and makes some sarcastic comments about William's complaints that he had not been properly rewarded to date for his service to the king. Henry therefore promised him the marriage and lands of Denise de Déols, lady of Châteauroux in Berry. In the resulting campaign, the king fell out with his heir Richard, count of Poitou, who consequently allied with Philip II against his father.

In 1189 while covering the flight of Henry from Le Mans to Chinon, William unhorsed Richard in a skirmish. William could have killed the prince but killed his horse instead, to make that point clear. He is said to have been the only man ever to unhorse Richard. Nonetheless, after Henry's death William was welcomed at court by Richard, apparently recognising that William's loyalty and military accomplishments were too useful to ignore, especially for a king who was intending to go on crusade.

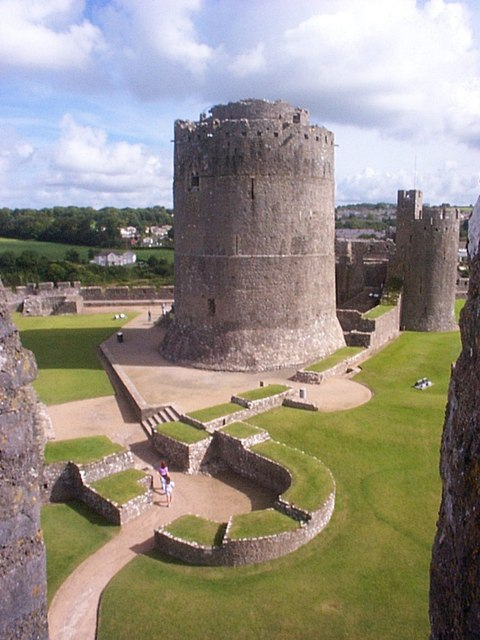
The massive Great Tower at Pembroke Castle, built by William Marshal.

During Henry's last days he had promised William the hand and estates of Isabel de Clare but had not completed the arrangements. King Richard, however, confirmed the offer and so in August 1189, William and Isabel married. William acquired large estates and claims in England, Wales, Normandy and Ireland. Some estates, however, were excluded from the deal. Marshal did not obtain Pembroke and the title of earl, which his father-in-law had enjoyed, until 1199, as it had been taken into the king's hand in 1154. However, the marriage transformed the landless knight from a minor family into one of the richest men in the kingdom, a sign of his power and prestige at court. They had five sons and five daughters, and have numerous descendants. William was a skilled administrator who made many improvements to his wife's lands, including extensive additions to Usk Castle, Pembroke Castle and Chepstow Castle, notable for their early use of round towers. Even though the marriage was a reward for his political and military services, and despite a significant age difference, the couple appear to have developed a real love and affection for each other. It is also notable that there is no evidence that Marshal ever took a mistress, which was commonplace for nobles and often widely discussed and reported.

William was included in the council of regency which Richard appointed on his departure for the Third Crusade in 1190. He took the side of John, the king's brother, when the latter expelled Justiciar William Longchamp from the kingdom, but he soon discovered that the interests of John were different from those of Richard. Hence in 1193 he joined with the loyalists in making war upon him. In the spring of 1194 during the course of the hostilities in England and before Richard's return, William's elder brother John Marshal (who was serving as seneschal) was killed while defending Marlborough for John. Richard allowed William to succeed his brother in the hereditary marshalship and his paternal honour of Hamstead Marshall. William served Richard with distinction as a trusted military commander and diplomat in his wars in Normandy against Philip II between 1194 and 1199. One particularly famous feat of arms occurred when William (who was around fifty) successfully invigorated a faltering assault on the castle of Milli in May 1197 by climbing a scaling-ladder onto the enemy ramparts in full armour, fighting off the defenders on top until reinforcements arrived and striking down the castle's constable with a single powerful blow. On Richard's deathbed, he designated William as custodian of Rouen and of the royal treasure during the interregnum.

== King John and Magna Carta ==
William supported John when he became king in 1199, arguing against those who maintained the claims of Arthur of Brittany, the teenage son of John's elder brother Geoffrey. William was heavily engaged with the defence of Normandy against the growing pressure of the Capetian armies between 1200 and 1203. Serving alongside the earls of Surrey and Salisbury, he repelled an attack on Arques and took part in King John's unsuccessful attempt to relieve the Siege of Château Gaillard. He sailed with John when he abandoned the duchy in December 1203. William and John had a falling out in the aftermath of the loss of Normandy when he was sent with the earl of Leicester as ambassadors to negotiate a truce with King Philip in 1204. William took the opportunity to negotiate the continued possession of his Norman lands.

Before commencing negotiations with Philip, William had been generously permitted to do homage to Philip by King John so he might keep his possessions in Normandy. However, once official negotiations began, Philip demanded that such homage be paid exclusively to him, which John had not consented to. When William paid homage to Philip, John took offence and there was a major row at court which led to cool relations between the two men.

Amidst this fall from royal favour, William began planning an expedition to further his control over his lordship of Leinster, which he had previously only briefly visited. He received John's written permission for this expedition on 19 February 1207, but it was swiftly informally revoked as John began to move against several major Irish magnates. But as he still had official written permission, William chose to proceed with the expedition anyway, arriving in Leinster in March 1207.

In Ireland, William became involved in the conflict between the Anglo-Irish barons, and John's justiciar in Ireland Meilyr fitz Henry. This led swiftly to a royal summons for both men, which William could not afford to ignore. Suspecting a royal trap, William took the precaution of reinforcing the defences of his Irish lands and making an impassioned speech to his household in which he urged them to serve and protect his wife until his return. Leaving a pregnant Isabel in Ireland, William returned to England and was humiliated at court just as he had feared. He was required to remain, while Meilyr was given leave to return to Ireland. In William's absence, Meilyr's men invaded his lands, burning the town of New Ross. However, the offensive was stemmed by Isabel and a number of William's loyal household knights, who made alliance with the De Lacy lords of Meath and Ulster. Meilyr's forces were totally defeated in early 1208 and William was subsequently allowed to return to Leinster.

He was once again at odds with King John in his war with the Braose and Lacy families in 1210, having briefly harboured William de Braose during his flight from England; Marshal took no part in the fighting, and was able to retain his position. He stayed in Ireland until 1213, during which time he may have had Carlow Castle erected and restructured his honour of Leinster.

After convincing twenty-six Anglo-Irish barons to renew their oaths of allegiance to the crown and advising reconciliation with Pope Innocent III, William was taken back into favour by John in 1212. The king's position grew increasingly precarious and by the spring of 1213, he summoned William to return to the English court. William brought a sizeable military force from Ireland to Kent as part of a general muster of those still loyal to John and was foremost in advising a naval strike on the French invasion fleet at Damme which led to its destruction in May.

William remained loyal throughout the hostilities between John and his barons which culminated on 15 June 1215 at Runnymede with the sealing of Magna Carta. William played a leading role in the negotiations that led to the agreement of Magna Carta; his name appears first among all the lay lords named in the document as John's advisers.

William was one of the few English earls to remain loyal to the king through the First Barons' War. It was William whom John trusted on his deathbed to make sure John's nine-year-old son Henry would get the throne. William took responsibility for the king's funeral and burial at Worcester Cathedral.

== Regent for Henry III ==
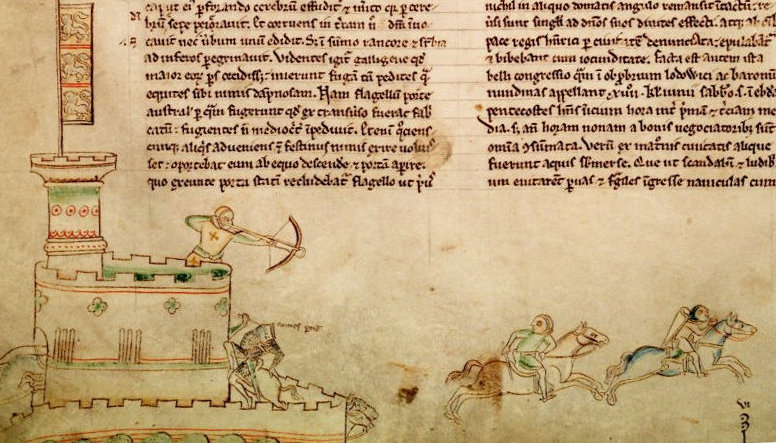
A 13th-century depiction of the Second Battle of Lincoln, which occurred at Lincoln Castle on 20 May 1217; the illustration shows the death of Thomas du Perche, the Comte de la Perche

On 11 November 1216 at Gloucester, upon the death of King John, William was named by the king's council (the chief barons who had remained loyal to King John in the First Barons' War) to serve as protector of Henry and regent of the kingdom. As there was no past precedent for William's role, a new title, rector regis et regni (Latin for "governor of the king and of the kingdom") was created for him.

With the treasury virtually empty and vast swathes of England under enemy occupation, the situation facing William was difficult, but his reputation granted the regency government of Henry III much needed legitimacy. According to Thomas Asbridge, "Earl William's near-legendary status as a renowned warrior and paragon of virtue lent a compelling, totemic power to his leadership. He was a living relic of the bygone age of Angevin glory; a man who could readily command respect and allegiance."

In spite of his advanced age (around 70) William prosecuted the war against Prince Louis and the rebel barons with remarkable energy. He launched an offensive in March 1217 that recaptured strongholds in Hampshire and Surrey, while in the decisive battle of Lincoln he charged and fought at the head of the army, leading them to victory. He was preparing to besiege Louis in London when the war was terminated by the naval victory of Hubert de Burgh in the Strait of Dover.

William was criticised for the generosity of the terms he accorded to Louis in September 1217, but his expedient settlement was dictated by sound statesmanship and a desire to remove the French from England as quickly as possible. Self-restraint and compromise were the keynotes of William's policy, hoping to secure peace and stability for Henry. Both before and after the peace of 1217 he reissued Magna Carta, in which he is a signatory as one of the witnessing barons.

After the conclusion of hostilities, William's regency continued working hard to stabilize the realm, issuing the Charter of the Forest, reconstituting the royal bench of judges, reopening the Exchequer and instituting the first general Eyre of Henry III's reign. These administrative achievements helped to indirectly set a precedent for trial by jury and began the gradual restoration of royal justice and crown finance throughout England.

== Death and legacy ==
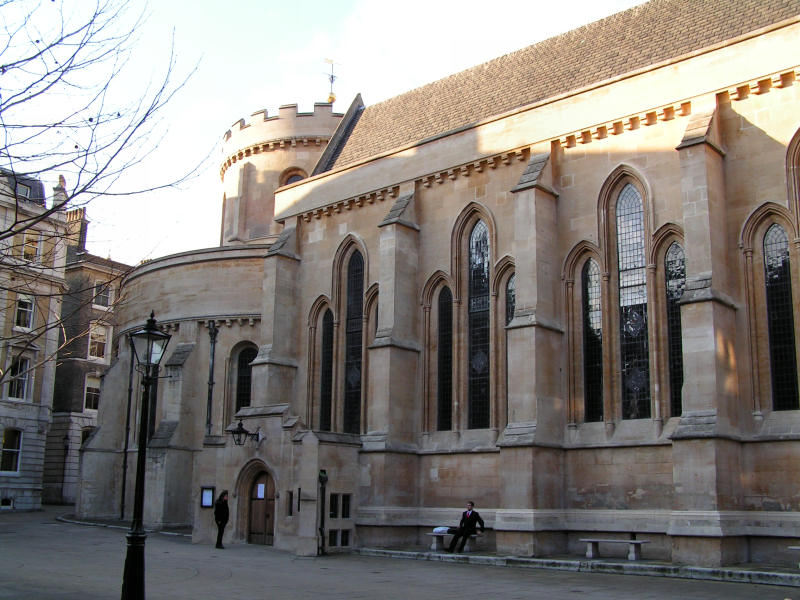
William Marshal was interred in Temple Church, London

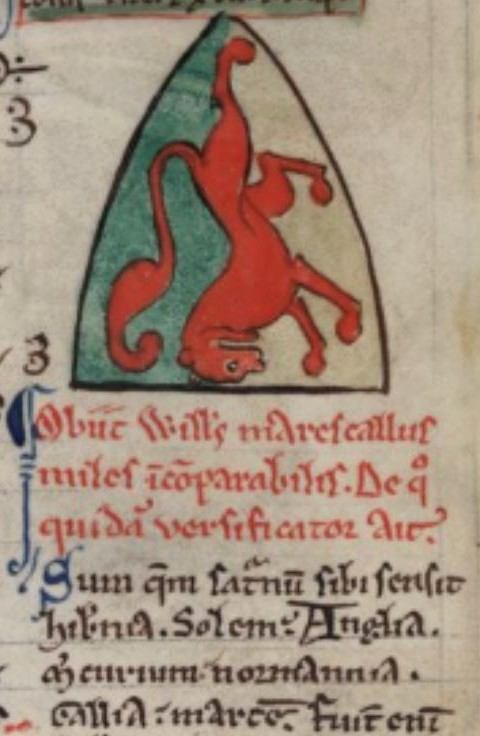
Inverted shield of William the Marshal (the incomparable knight) with obituary and epitaph portrayed by Matthew Paris

William, who had enjoyed robust health throughout his life, was "plagued by illness and pain" in early 1219. By March he realised that he was dying, so he summoned his eldest son William and his household knights and left the Tower of London for his estate at Caversham. There he called a meeting of the barons, Henry, the Papal Legate Pandulf Verraccio, Justiciar Hubert de Burgh, and Peter des Roches (Bishop of Winchester and Henry's guardian). William rejected the bishop's claim to the regency, instead entrusting the regency to the care of the papal legate. He apparently did not trust the bishop or any of the other magnates that he had gathered to this meeting.

Fulfilling the vow he had made while on crusade, he was invested into the order of the Knights Templar on his deathbed and commanded that for burial, his body and bier should be covered in two silk shrouds he had obtained in the Holy Land decades before. William Marshal died peacefully on 14 May 1219 at Caversham, surrounded by his friends and family. As he had wished, William was buried in Temple Church in London, where his stone effigy can still be seen.

Following William's death, his family commissioned a biography, The History of William the Marshal, which was completed by 1226. The biography's rediscovery by French historian Paul Meyer in 1861 allowed for a detailed reconstruction of William's life, who had previously been a "shadowy figure" in Anglo-Norman history.

The survival of Magna Carta and the Plantagenet dynasty on the throne of England was by no means assured when William Marshal first accepted the position of regent and historian David Carpenter has called the 1217 Battle of Lincoln "Second only to Hastings as the most decisive in English history." After the war had been won, William faced the challenge of restoring peace to a war-torn country with a shattered economy, a task he accomplished with none of the bloody purges that marked England's later medieval conflicts. William rallied a country on the brink of defeat at an age when many men of his day had difficulty walking, let alone leading a cavalry charge.

In many ways, William Marshal was the archetypal medieval knight. His qualities epitomized and defined those valued in the late twelfth- and early- thirteenth century, and his career stood as testament to how high knights could rise and what they could accomplish. Contemporaries recognized the scope of William's achievements, and he served as an inspiration for medieval writers of Arthurian Literature. Summarizing William Marshal's legacy, Thomas Asbridge writes that "William died in a different England to the one in which he had been born, but it was a country he had been instrumental in shaping. For centuries thereafter, England would be ruled by kings supported, but also checked, by a warrior aristocracy. And the ideals that they hammered out on the tournament field, in the politics of the court, in the blood of civil war and, ultimately, in Magna Carta, form the basis of the principles by which much of the world is now governed."

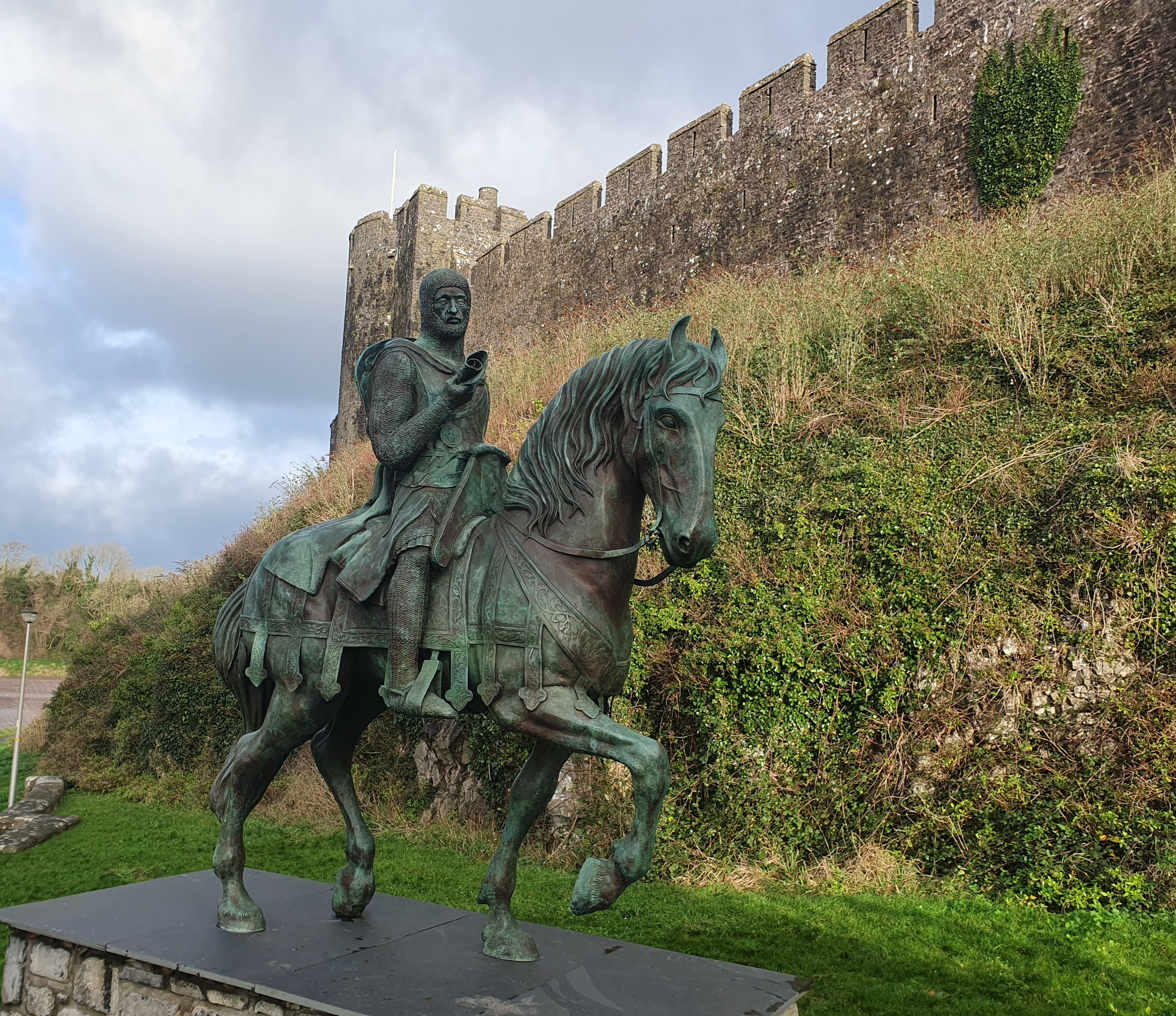
Statue of William Marshal in front of Pembroke Castle

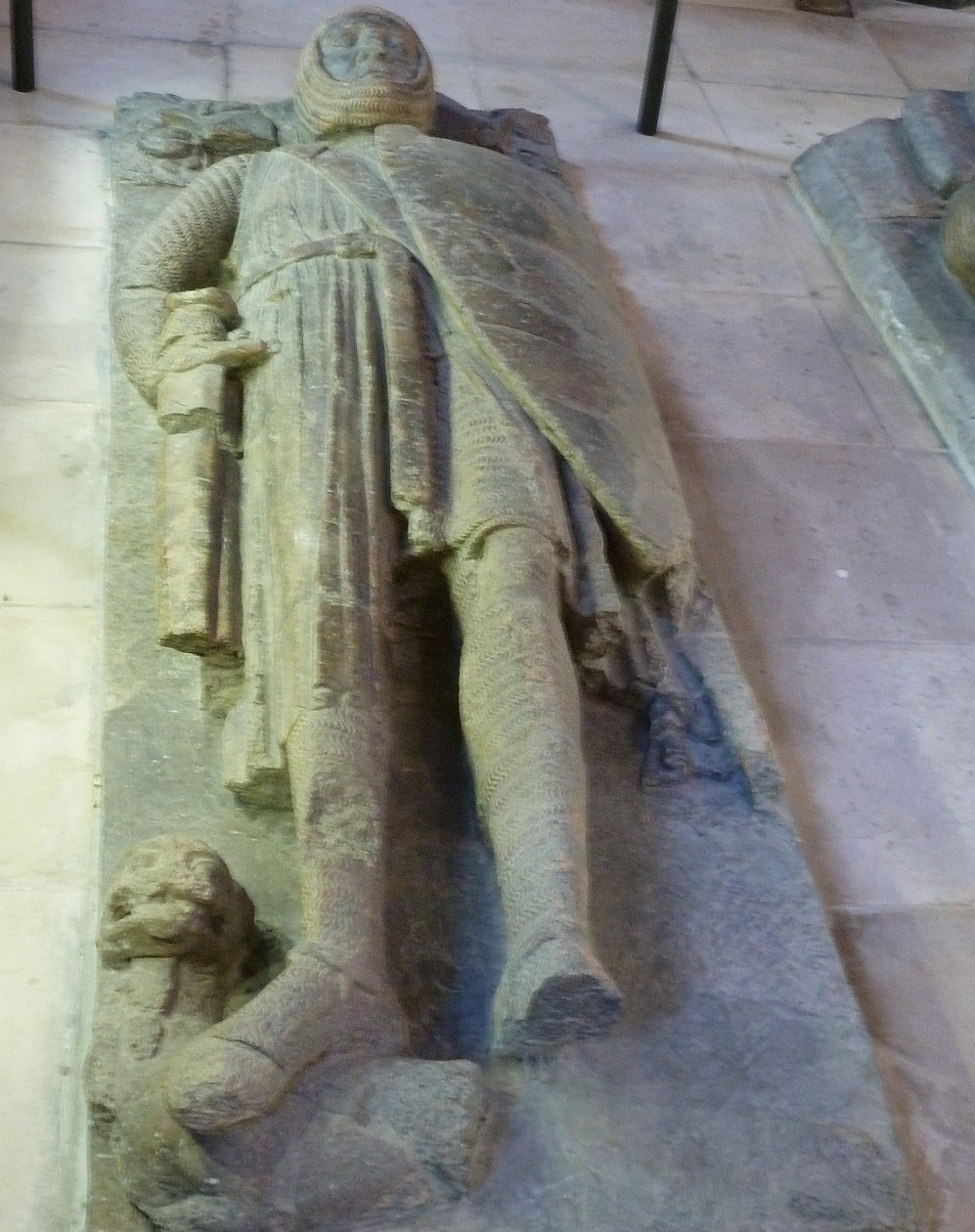
Tomb of William Marshal

A statue of Marshal on horseback was unveiled in front of Pembroke Castle in 2022. It was created by Harriet Addyman, and followed a campaign by Pembroke and Monkton Local History Society.

== Descendants ==
1. William Marshal, 2nd Earl of Pembroke (1190 – 6 April 1231), married (1) Alice de Béthune, daughter of Baldwin of Bethune; (2) 23 April 1224 Eleanor Plantagenet, daughter of King John of England. They had no children.
2. Richard Marshal, 3rd Earl of Pembroke (1191 – 16 April 1234), married Gervaise de Dinan. He died in captivity. They had no children.
3. Maud Marshal (1194 – 27 March 1248), married (1) Hugh Bigod, 3rd Earl of Norfolk, they had four children; (2) William de Warenne, 5th Earl of Surrey, they had two children.
4. Gilbert Marshal, 4th Earl of Pembroke (1197 – 27 June 1241), married (1) Marjorie of Scotland, youngest daughter of King William I of Scotland; by an unknown mistress he had one illegitimate daughter:
  1. Isabel Marshal, betrothed to Rhys ap Maelgwn Fychan (son of Maelgwn ap Rhys)
5. Walter Marshal, 5th Earl of Pembroke (c. 1199 – November 1245), married Margaret de Quincy, Countess of Lincoln, granddaughter of Hugh de Kevelioc, 3rd Earl of Chester. No children.
6. Isabel Marshal (9 October 1200 – 17 January 1240), married (1) Gilbert de Clare, 4th Earl of Hertford, whose daughter Isabel de Clare married Robert Bruce, 5th Lord of Annandale, the grandfather of Robert the Bruce; (2) Richard Plantagenet, Earl of Cornwall
7. Sibyl Marshal (c. 1201 – 27 April 1245), married William de Ferrers, 5th Earl of Derby; they had seven daughters.
  1. Agnes de Ferrers (died 11 May 1290), married William de Vesci.
  2. Isabel de Ferrers (died before 26 November 1260)
  3. Maud de Ferrers (died 12 March 1298), married (1) Simon de Kyme, (2) William de Vivonia (de Forz), and (3) Amaury IX of Rochechouart.
  4. Sibyl de Ferrers, married Sir Franco de Bohun.
  5. Joan de Ferrers (died 1267)
  6. Agatha de Ferrers (died May 1306), married Hugh de Mortimer, of Chelmarsh.
  7. Eleanor de Ferrers (died 26 October 1274), married (1) William de Vaux of Tharston and Wisset, (2) Roger de Quincy, Earl of Winchester, and (3) Roger de Leyburne of Elham.
8. Eva Marshal (1203–1246), married William de Braose, Lord of Abergavenny
  1. Isabella de Braose (born 1222), married Prince Dafydd ap Llywelyn. She died childless.
  2. Maud de Braose (1224–1301), in 1247, she married Roger Mortimer, 1st Baron Mortimer and they had descendants.
  3. Eva de Braose (1227 – 28 July 1255), married Sir William de Cantelou and had descendants.
  4. Eleanor de Braose (c. 1228 – 1251). On an unknown date after August 1241, she married Sir Humphrey de Bohun and had descendants.
9. Anselm Marshal, 6th Earl of Pembroke (c. 1208 – 22 December 1245), married Maud de Bohun, daughter of Humphrey de Bohun, 2nd Earl of Hereford. They had no children.
10. Joan Marshal (1210–1234), married Warin de Munchensi (died 1255), Lord of Swanscombe
  1. Joan de Munchensi (1230 – 20 September 1307) married William of Valence, the fourth son of King John's widow, Isabella of Angoulême, and her second husband, Hugh X of Lusignan, Count of La Marche. Valence was half-brother to Henry III and Edward I's uncle.

During Ireland's civil wars, William took two manors that the Bishop of Ferns claimed but could not get back. Some years after William's death, that bishop is said to have laid a curse on the family that William's sons would have no children and that William's estates would be scattered. Each of William's sons did become earl of Pembroke and marshal of England, and each died without legitimate issue. William's vast holdings were then divided among the husbands of his five daughters. The title of "Marshal" went to the husband of the oldest daughter, Hugh Bigod, 3rd Earl of Norfolk, and later passed to the Mowbray dukes of Norfolk and then to the Howard dukes of Norfolk, becoming "Earl Marshal" along the way. The title of "Earl of Pembroke" passed to William of Valence, the husband of Joan Marshal's daughter, Joan de Munchensi; he became the first of the de Valence line of earls of Pembroke.

Through his daughter Isabel, William is an ancestor to both the Bruce and Stewart kings of Scots. Through his granddaughter Maud de Braose, William is an ancestor to the last Plantagenet kings, Edward IV through to Richard III, and all English monarchs from Henry VIII and afterward.

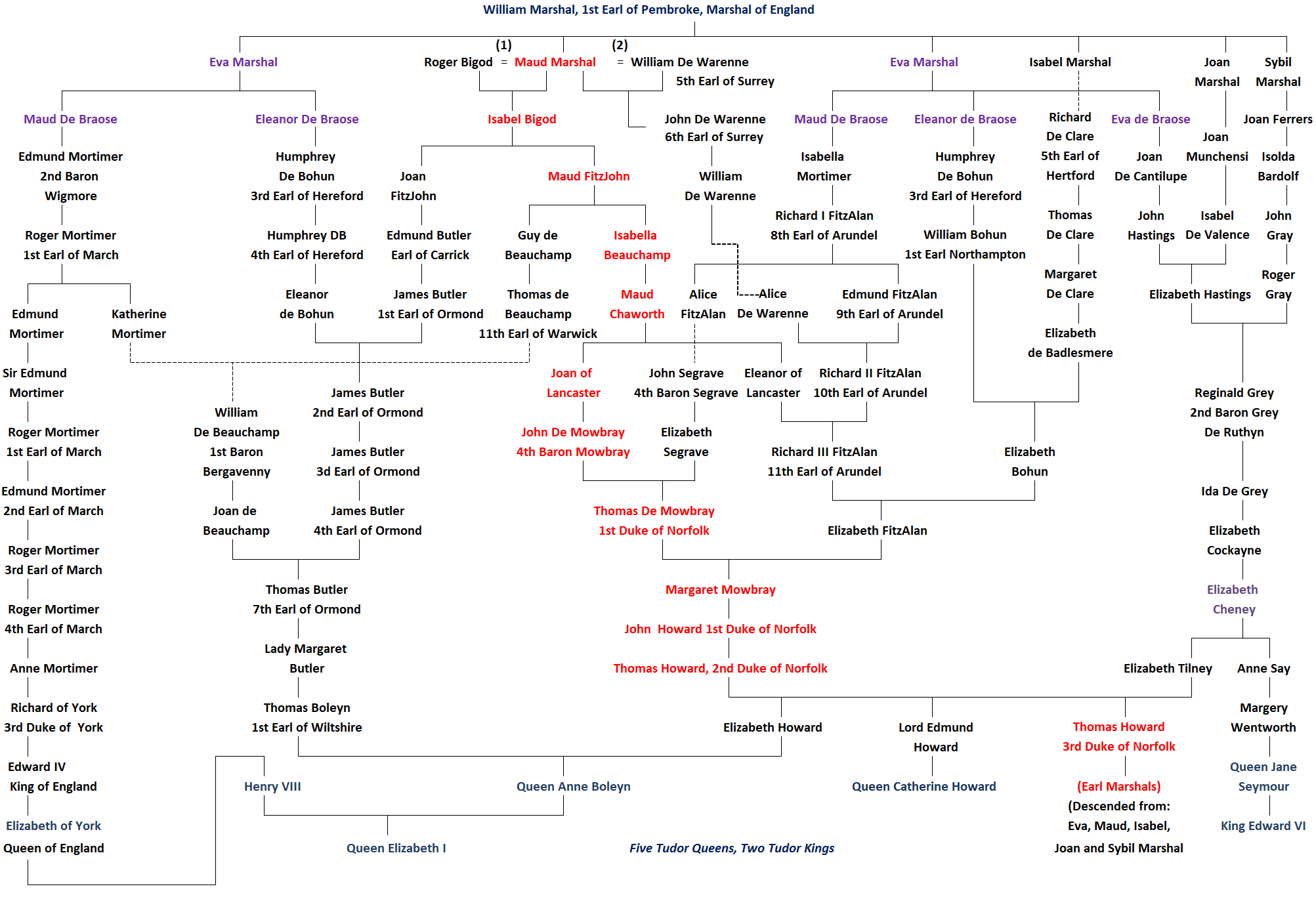

== See also ==
- Cultural depictions of William Marshal, 1st Earl of Pembroke
- Histoire de Guillaume le Maréchal

== Sources ==
- Asbridge, Thomas (2015a). The Greatest Knight: The Remarkable Life of William Marshal, Power Behind Five English Thrones. London: Simon & Schuster.
- Asbridge, Thomas S. (2015b). The greatest knight : the remarkable life of William Marshal, the power behind five English thrones. Internet Archive. New York, NY : Ecco, an imprint of HarperCollinsPublishers. ISBN 978-0-06-226206-6.
- Benson, Larry D. (1980). 'The Tournament in the romances of Chrétien de Troyes and L'Histoire de Guillaume le Maréchal' in Studies in Medieval Culture XIV 1–24
- Chisholm, Hugh, ed. (1911). "Pembroke, Earls of" . Encyclopædia Britannica. Vol. 21 (11th ed.). Cambridge University Press. p. 78.
- Crouch, David (2007). "Biography as Propaganda in the 'History of William Marshal", in Convaincre et persuader: Communication et propagande aux XII et XIIIe siècles. Ed. par Martin Aurell. Poitiers: Université de Poitiers-centre d'études supérieures de civilisation médiévale.
- Crouch, David edited (2015). The Acts and Letters of the Marshal Family, Marshals of England and Earls of Pembroke, 1145–1248. Camden Society, 5th series, vol. 47.
- Crouch, David (2016). William Marshal: Knighthood, War and Chivalry, 1147–1219 (3rd ed.). London: Routledge. doi:10.4324/9781315642468. ISBN 978-1-317-28308-9. OCLC 953857684.
- Duby, Georges (1985). William Marshal, the Flower of Chivalry. New York: Pantheon.
- Gillingham, John (1988). "War and Chivalry in the History of William the Marshal" in Thirteenth Century England II ed. P.R. Coss and S.D. Lloyd. Woodbridge, 1–13.
- Kingsford, Charles Lethbridge (1893). "Marshal, William (d.1219)" . In Lee, Sidney (ed.). Dictionary of National Biography. Vol. 36. London: Smith, Elder & Co. pp. 225–233.
- Meyer, Paul (1891–1901). L'Histoire de Guillaume le Maréchal, with partial translation of the original sources into Modern French. Edition, History of William Marshal, (3 vols). Paris: Société de l'histoire de France. Volume 1 Volume 2 Volume 3
- Painter, Sidney (1933). William Marshal, Knight-Errant, Baron, and Regent of England. Baltimore: Johns Hopkins Press.

Peerage of England
New creation	Earl of Pembroke; 1199–1219	Succeeded by William Marshal
Honorary titles
Preceded by John Marshal	Lord Marshal; 1194–1219	Succeeded by William Marshal
