= David Crouch (historian) =

British historian (born 1953)

David Crouch FRHistS, FBA
- Born: David Bruce Crouch; 31 October 1953 (age 72); Cardiff, Wales
- Known for: Professor of Medieval History, Author

Academic background
- Education: Cardiff University

Academic work
- Discipline: Medieval Social History
- Institutions: Hull University

David Bruce Crouch (born 31 October 1953) is a British historian and academic. From 2000 until his retirement in 2018, he was Professor of Medieval History at the University of Hull.

== Academia ==
Crouch graduated in history from the former University College, Cardiff, in 1975, and pursued a career in secondary school teaching in Mountain Ash, South Wales till 1983. While serving as a schoolteacher he completed a doctorate on the Anglo-Norman twin aristocrats, Waleran of Meulan and Robert of Leicester, subsequently published by Cambridge University Press. From 1984, he occupied research posts in the University of London until moving to a teaching position in North Riding College, later University College, Scarborough in 1990. In 2000, he transferred to the Department of History in the University of Hull as professor of medieval history. He has occupied visiting professorships in Poitiers and Milwaukee. From 2013, he held a Leverhulme Trust Major Research Fellowship and in 2015 he was a member of the Institute for Advanced Study, Princeton. Since retirement he has devoted his energies to the ongoing Victoria Counties of England series on Yorkshire East Riding, publishing a two-volume study of Howdenshire wapentake and the reconstruction of a medieval Howdenshire gentry cartulary, constructing an edition from 17th-century antiquaries’ transcripts.

== Corpus of work ==
Crouch's main focus is on the social and political history of the period from 1000 to 1300, primarily in England and France, with a particular emphasis on comparative studies of social structures between the various realms of Britain and continental France. His fullest statement on his theory that it was the formulation of nobility as a self-conscious aristocratic quality demanding social deference is to be found in his 2005 work The Birth of Nobility. His idea is that once nobility was a quality that could be acquired and demonstrated by conduct and lifestyle as much as by birth, a cascade effect was triggered which produced a hierarchy of social classes organised by relative degrees of nobility. He sees this as happening in the generations on either side of the year 1200.

From the beginning of his career, Crouch has also published on the medieval history of South East Wales and the diocese of Llandaff.

In political history, Crouch has written influential biographies of King Stephen and William Marshal. He was a member of the academic team which edited and translated into English the contemporary medieval biography of Marshal.

Crouch's books on the aristocracy of England and France in the High Middle Ages have been characterised by his incorporation of English social history into the mainstream of continental scholarship.

== Honours ==
In 1986, Crouch was elected a Fellow of the Royal Historical Society (FRHistS). In 2014, he was elected a Fellow of the British Academy (FBA), the United Kingdom's national academy for the humanities and social sciences.

== Books ==
- The Beaumont Twins: The Roots and Branches of Power in the Twelfth Century. Cambridge: Cambridge University Press. 1986. ISBN 0-521-30215-3.
- William Marshal: Court, Career and Chivalry in the Angevin Empire 1147-1219. Harlow: Longman. 1990. ISBN 0-582-03786-7. 2nd edition 2002.
- The Image of Aristocracy in Britain, 1000-1300. London: Routledge. 1992. ISBN 0-415-01911-7.
- The Reign of King Stephen, 1135-1154. Harlow: Longman. 2000. ISBN 0-582-22658-9.
- The Normans: The History of a Dynasty. London: Hambledon and London. 2002. ISBN 1-85285-387-5.
- Tournament. London: Hambledon and London. 2005. ISBN 1-85285-460-X.
- The Birth of Nobility: Constructing Aristocracy in England and France: 900-1300. Harlow: Longman. 2005. ISBN 0-582-36981-9.
- The English Aristocracy, 1070-1272: A Social Transformation. New Haven, Conn. and London: Yale University Press. 2011. ISBN 978-0-300-11455-3.
- Lost Letters of Medieval Life: English Society, 1200-1250, edited with Martha Carlin. Philadelphia and London: Pennsylvania University Press. 2013. ISBN 978-0-8122-4459-5.
- The Newburgh Earldom of Warwick and its Charters, 1088-1253, edited with Richard Dace. The Dugdale Society, volume 48. 2015. ISBN 978-0-8522-00995.
- The Acts and Letters of the Marshal Family 1156-1248. Camden Society 5th ser. volume 47. 2015. ISBN 978-1-1071-30036.
- Medieval Britain, c.1000-1500. Cambridge: Cambridge University Press. 2017. ISBN 978-0-5211-90718. (volume 2 in the Cambridge History of Britain series)
- The Chivalric Turn: Conduct and Hegemony in Medieval Europe before 1300. Oxford: Oxford University Press. 2019. ISBN 978-0-1987-82940.
- The Victoria History of the Counties of England, A History of the County of York: East Riding Volume X: Part 1: Howdenshire: the Townships. Woodbridge: Boydell & Brewer. 2019. ISBN 978-1-9043-56509.
- The Victoria History of the Counties of England, A History of the County of York: East Riding Volume X: Part 2: Town and Liberty. Woodbridge: Boydell & Brewer. 2021. ISBN 978-1-9043-56530.
