= Richard Fulmerston =

16th-century English politician

Richard Fulmerston (by 1516 – 1567), of Ipswich, Suffolk and Thetford, Norfolk, was an English politician, entrepreneur, and philanthropist.

== Family ==
It is unclear who Fulmerston's parents are, but his father may also have been named Richard Fulmerston. It is thought the family probably originated from Fulmodeston, Norfolk. Fulmerston married Alice Maye, the daughter of 'Lonzam' (Robert Maye of Lavenham, Suffolk) and widow of Ipswich merchant and MP, Thomas Hayward, who had died in 1534. Fulmerston had married Alice by March 1539. They had at least one daughter, Frances, who married Edward Clere.

== Career ==
Fulmerston was a servant of Thomas, 3rd Duke of Norfolk, a family with whom the Fulmerstons of Norfolk had a long-standing connection.

St George's Priory, a house of Benedictine nuns, and a dependency of Bury St Edmunds Abbey, was dissolved In 1537 and the buildings and land were granted to Fulmerston. The buildings were converted to a house, but in the early seventeenth century a new house was built, known as Nunnery Place. The church was converted into a barn. As of 1991, the British Trust for Ornithology occupies the site.

In 1538, he was under-steward to the former Lady Mary Howard, then Duchess of Richmond.

He purchased the Blackfriars Friary, dissolved in 1538; and leased the Priory of St Mary, formerly of Benedictine monks affiliated with Cluny Abbey, from Norfolk. He also purchased the chantry of the College of Saint John the Evangelist of Rushworth, which at dissolution in 1541 had been granted to Henry Howard, Earl of Surrey. As such a large landholder, his position in the community increased considerably after the arrest of Norfolk in 1546.

Fulmerston was a Member (MP) of the Parliament of England for Southwark in 1547, for Great Bedwyn in October 1553, April 1554 and November 1554, for Horsham in 1558, for New Shoreham in 1559 and for Thetford in 1563. He supported Queen Mary against Lady Jane Grey's supporters in 1553.

He re-founded The Grammar School in Thetford, the original school having been a pre-conquest monastic foundation until the Dissolution. By the terms of his will, Fulmerston directed his heirs to establish a free grammar school in Thetford. Soon after his death, they erected a school-house upon part of Blackfriars Yard. The 16th century school building incorporates part of the church of the Dominican Friary and is still is use by Thetford Grammar School.
