= St George's Priory, Thetford =

Coordinates: 52°24′23″N 0°45′08″E

St George's Priory, Thetford was a Benedictine priory on the Suffolk side of Thetford, England. It was located at the current site of the British Trust for Ornithology, South of Nuns Bridges Road.

== History ==
The priory was founded by Uvius, Abbot of Bury St Edmunds from 1020 to 1044, although there are references to a direct connection with Cnut in 1016.

By circa 1160, the Priory had become 'depressed with poverty', and the two remaining members, Toleard and Andrew, told Abbot Hugh, then abbot of Bury St Edmunds, that they wished to withdraw. The abbot and convent of St Edmunds, having received references from the bishop of Norwich, the archdeacon of Canterbury, and the sheriff of Norfolk and Suffolk, sent prioress Cecilia and a group of Benedictine nuns who had been living at Lyng, Norfolk, to Thetford priory. Abbot Hugh gave the priory two parish churches in Thetford (St Benedict and All Saints) together with rights over the belongings of the abbey of Bury 'within the limits of Thetford'.

In 1424 the friars granted to William Curteys, Benedictine prior of Bury St Edmunds Abbey, and his brethren the use of the best chamber of this house, called the 'common recreatory,' which was henceforth to be termed St Edmund's House; they were to occupy it as they liked, but not to grant or alienate it without the consent of the friars. This must have been a great convenience to the abbey of St Edmunds, as it held the patronage and was responsible for the lands of the adjacent nunnery.

The priory continued, with typically a total of ten 'professed nuns' and novices, until its dissolution in February 1537. At this stage, the last prioress, Elizabeth Hothe, was awarded a pension, upon which she survived at least sixteen years to attain the age of 100. The buildings and land were granted to Sir Richard Fulmerston. The buildings were converted to a house, where Fulmerston's son-in-law Edward Clere welcomed Elizabeth I in 1578. In the early seventeenth century, a new house was built, known as The Place, and the church was converted into a barn.

== Prioresses of St George, Thetford ==
One source, A History of the County of Suffolk, gives the following list of Prioresses (variants on this are noted according to An Essay Towards A Topographical History of the County of Norfolk)

- Cecilia, c. 1160
- Agnes, occurs 1253
- Ellen de Berdesette ('Ellen de Berdewell'), elected 1310
- Margaret Bretom, elected 1329
- Beatrix de Lystone, elected 1330
- Danetta de Wakethorp ('Dametta de Bakethorp'), elected 1339
- Margaret Campleon, elected 1396
- Margaret Chykering, elected 1418
- Alice Wesenham, elected 1420
- Margaret Copynger ('Margaret Copyng' or 'Margery Copinger'), elected 1466
- Joan Eyton, elected 1477
- Elizabeth Mounteneye, elected 1498
- Lady Eliz. Gournay, 'installed' 1518
- Sarah Frost, elected 1519
- Elizabeth Hothe (alias 'Heath', installed 1534), occurs 1535, last prioress

== See also ==
List of monastic houses in Norfolk

=== Other mediaeval ecclesiastical foundations in Thetford ===
- Austin Friars Southeast of Thetford Castle
- Blackfriars, Thetford at the site of Thetford Grammar School
- Holy Sepulchre Priory, Thetford between Brandon Road and River Little Ouse
- Thetford Priory dedicated to St Mary on the North (Norfolk) side of the River Little Ouse (to which it moved from an earlier site which became the Blackfriars establishment)
