= Black Horse =

A black horse is an equine coat color.

Black Horse and Blackhorse may refer to:

== Arts ==
- The Black Horse (play), a 1937 Australian radio play by Vance Palmer

== Locations ==
- Blackhorse, Dublin, a neighbourhood in Dublin, Ireland
- Black Horse, New Jersey, a community in the United States

== Pubs ==
- Black Horse Tavern (disambiguation), various taverns
- Black Horse, Northfield, Birmingham, England
- Black Horse, Preston, Lancashire, England
- Black Horse, Skipton, North Yorkshire, England
- Black Horse, Thetford, Norfolk, England
- Black Horse, Whitby, North Yorkshire
- Black Horse, York, North Yorkshire

== Other uses ==
- Black Horse (spaceplane), a proposed winged, single stage to orbit launch vehicle
- Black Horse Cavalry, a group of corrupt individuals in the New York State Legislature during the 19th century
- Black Horse Pike, an historic route in New Jersey
- Black Horse Regiment, nom de guerre of the U.S. Army 11th Armored Cavalry Regiment
- Black Horse Pike Regional School District
- Black Horse (finance company), a subsidiary, trading name and the logo of Lloyds Banking Group
- Black Horse (Libyan company), Libyan state-owned arms company
- Black Horse (Comanche), a Native American Comanche leader
- one of the Four Horsemen of the Apocalypse
- Black Horse Westerns, an imprint of British publisher Robert Hale Ltd.
- Blackhorse Road station, on the London Underground and Overground
- Black Horse (legend), a traditional story from French Canada

== See also ==
- Black Horse Tavern (disambiguation)
- Dark Horse (disambiguation)
- Kala Ghoda (lit. 'Black Horse'), district of Mumbai, India
  - Kala Ghoda Arts Festival, an annual arts festival
- Kala Ghoda, a fictional villain in the 1955 Indian film Munimji, played by Pran
