= Thornham Parva =

Village in Suffolk, England

Coordinates: 52.313°N 1.091°E

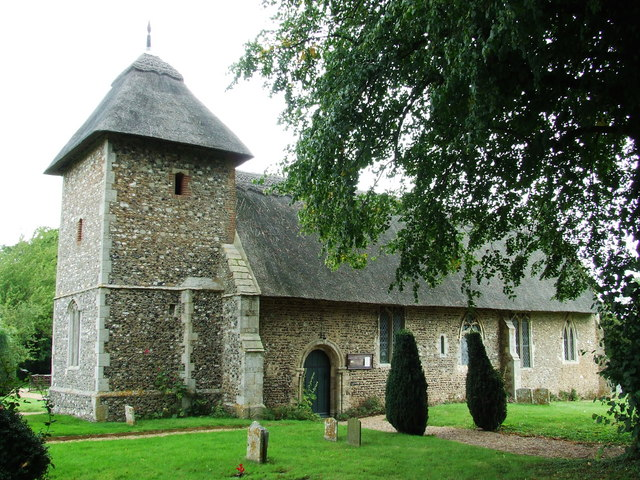
- St Mary's Church, Thornham Parva

- Location within Suffolk
- Population: 50
- District: Mid Suffolk
- Shire county: Suffolk
- Region: East
- Country: England
- Sovereign state: United Kingdom
- Post town: Eye
- Postcode district: IP23
- Police: Suffolk
- Fire: Suffolk
- Ambulance: East of England

Thornham Parva is a village and civil parish in the Mid Suffolk district of Suffolk in eastern England. Located to the north of sister village Thornham Magna and around five miles south of Diss, in 2005 its population was 50. By the time of the 2011 Census populations of less than 100 were not maintained separately and this village was included in the population of Thornham Magna.

== St Mary's Church ==
The small, thatched St Mary's Church is a Grade I listed building. It has early 14th-century wall paintings, on the south wall, the early years of Christ and on the north wall, the martyrdom of St Edmund. There is a circular window in the west wall of the nave that is said to be late Anglo-Saxon as well as the famous retable. Architect Basil Spence died in 1976 at his home in Yaxley, Suffolk and was buried at Thornham Parva. The graves of Dame Anne Warburton, the first female British ambassador, the violinist, Frederick Grinke, and Gareth Jones, "founding father" of the English law of restitution, also lie within the churchyard.

== Thornham Parva Retable ==
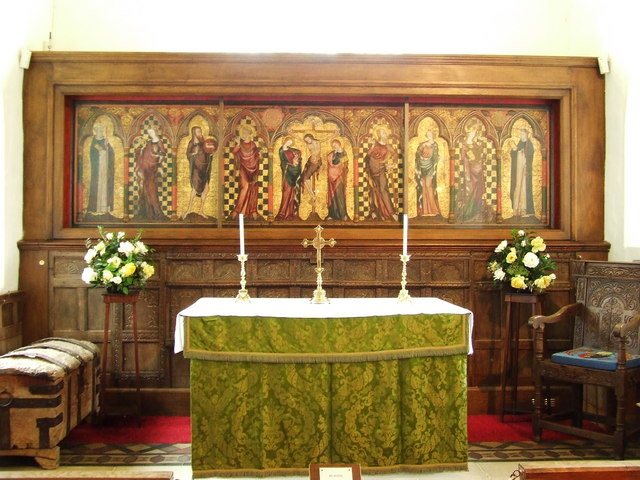
The Thornham Parva Retable

The Thornham Parva Retable is a 15 feet (4.6 m) long medieval altarpiece, thought to have been created in the 1330s for a Dominican Priory. It is the largest surviving altarpiece from the English Middle Ages. It survived the reformers of the 16th Century, who raged against idolatry and destroyed most of England's medieval culture, by being removed from the priory. It was discovered in 1927 in a loft at Thornham Hall. The local landowner, Lord Henniker donated it to the church of Thornham Parva where his brother was parson.

The origins of the retable were a puzzle but the picture itself provided vital clues. The figures pinpointed links with the Dominican Order. At either end are St Dominic and St Peter Martyr, joint patrons of the Dominicans. St Catherine and St Margaret of Antioch were the order's mascots. The Apostles Peter and Paul, who were believed to have spoken to St Dominic, all point towards Dominican interest. The presence of St Edmund suggests an East Anglian link. John the Baptist's figure might seem more obscure, but the benefactors of the Dominican Priory at Thetford, John de Warenne, 7th Earl of Surrey and Edmund Gonville would have expected their namesakes to be part of the finished painting.

The retable returned to Thornham Parva church in 2003, following eight years of restoration by the Hamilton Kerr Institute in Cambridge. Using sturgeon glue, applied with tiny dabs of cotton buds, inch by inch the layers of grime were removed to reveal rich gold and glowing autumnal palette of translucent reds, purples and greens which the original artist used.
