= Holy Sepulchre Priory, Thetford =

Monastery in Thetford, Norfolk, England

Coordinates: 52.4137°N 0.7406°E

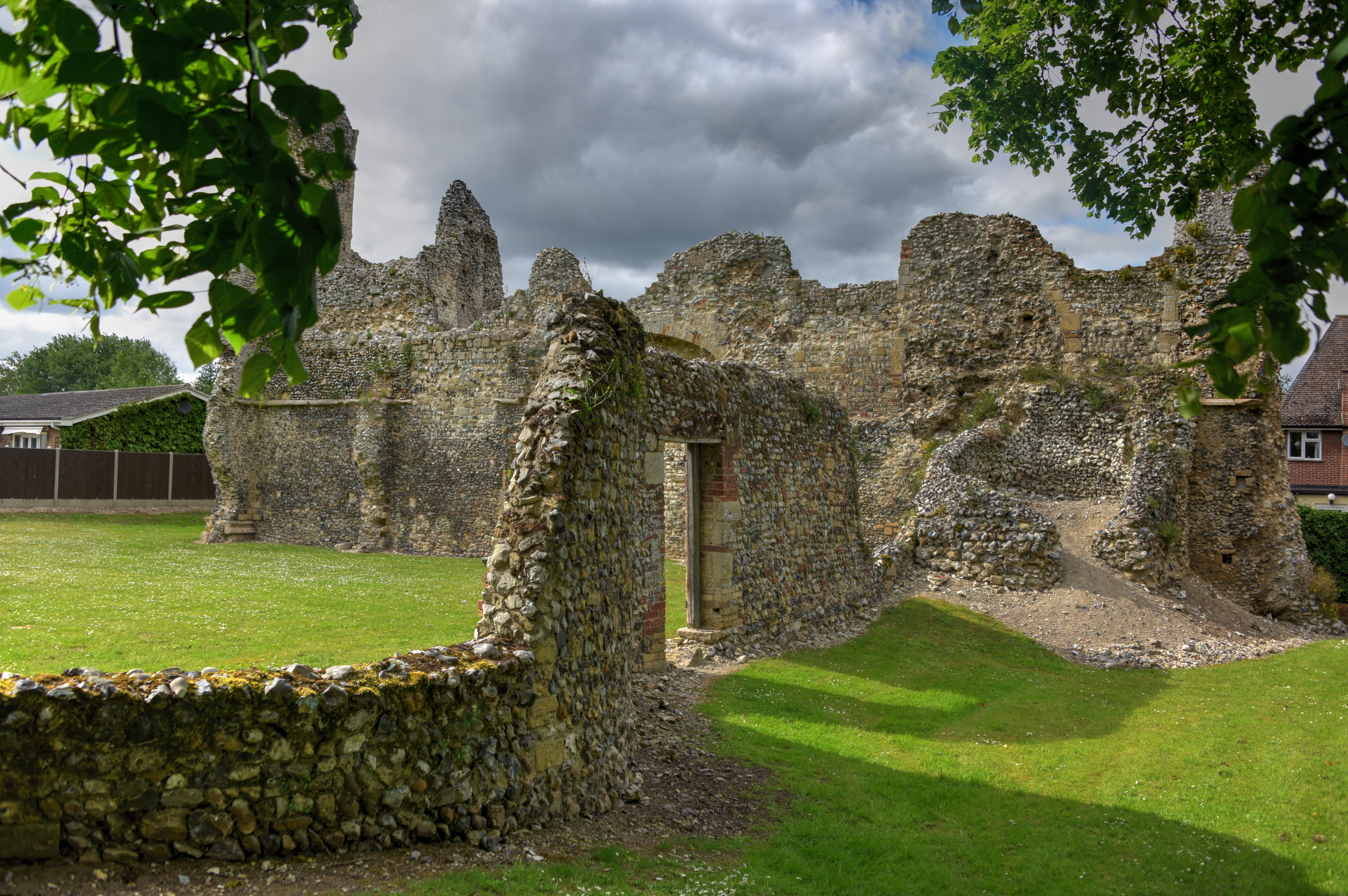
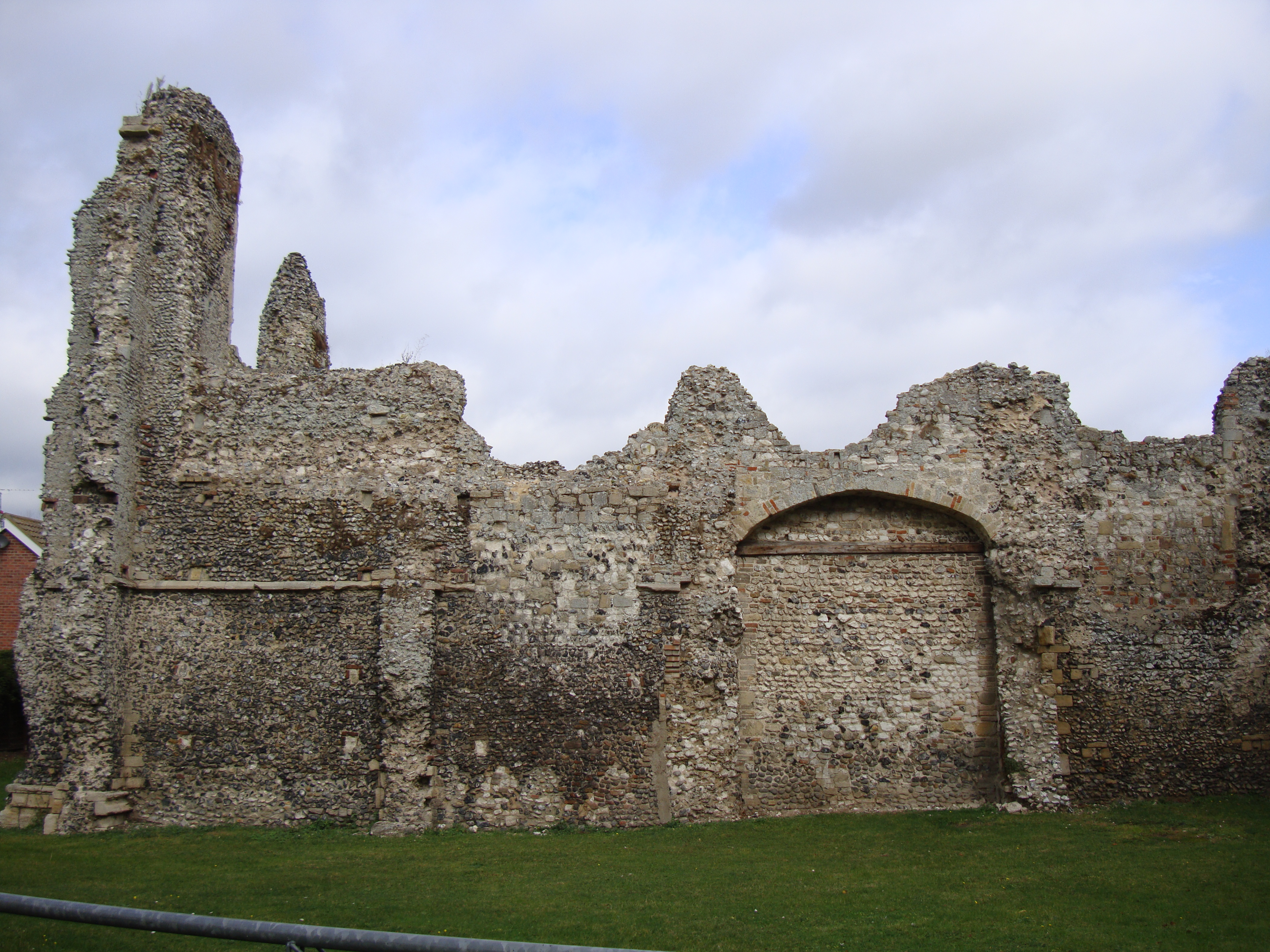
The remains of the Church of the Holy Sepulchre, Thetford

The Holy Sepulchre Priory was a medieval monastic house in Thetford, Norfolk. The ruins of the nave of the priory's 14th-century church are the only surviving remains in England of a priory of Canons of the Holy Sepulchre, who followed the Rule of Saint Augustine and aided pilgrims to Christ's tomb. It was later used as a barn, and is a Grade I listed building.

== Domus Dei ==
The hospital of Domus Dei (or God's House) originated sometime before 1319. It was located on the Suffolk side of the borough; the river washed its walls on the north, and the east side fronted the street.

In 1335, John de Warenne, 7th Earl of Surrey, transferred it to Canons Regular of the Holy Sepulchre at Holy Sepulchre Priory. In 1347 Henry of Grosmont was patron of the Domus Dei. He confirmed to the prior and canons the gift of the lands, tenements, and rents lately belonging to the Hospital of God's House, but excepted the actual site of the hospital, which he conferred upon the Blackfriars to maintain. The site of the Domus Dei stood between their cloister and the High Street.

Two of the canons were to sing daily mass in the conventual church for the souls of the founders of the hospital. The priory was also to find a house yearly for three poor people from 9 November to 29 April, giving to each of them nightly a loaf of good rye bread, and a herring or two eggs. They were also to provide three beds, and hot water for washing their feet. This charter received royal confirmation the following year.

== See also ==
- Austin Friars, Thetford, Southeast of Thetford Castle
- Blackfriars, Thetford, at the site of Thetford Grammar School
- St George's Priory, Thetford, at the site of the British Trust for Ornithology South of Nuns Bridges Road
- Thetford Priory, a Cluniac Priory 300 metres to the north of Holy Sepulchre Priory, directly across the River Little Ouse
