= Thornham Parva Retable =

Medieval altarpiece

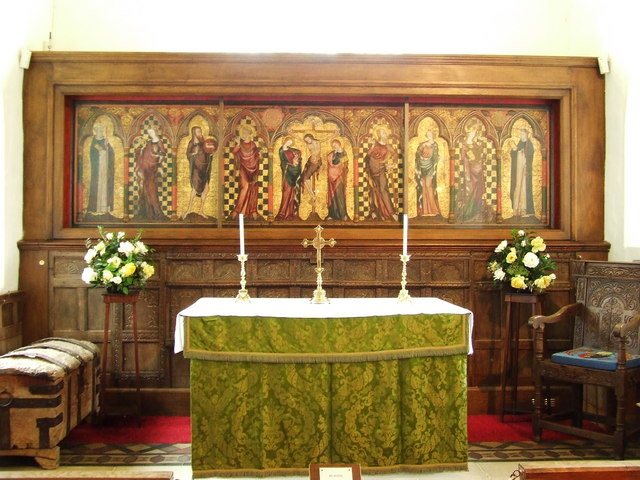
The Thornham Parva Retable

The Thornham Parva Retable is a medieval altarpiece, now in Thornham Parva, Suffolk, England. The retable is thought to have been created in the 1330s for a Dominican Priory. At 15 feet (4.6 m) long, it is the largest surviving altarpiece from the English Middle Ages.

The retable survived the iconoclastic reformers of the 16th Century, who destroyed many of England's medieval culture, by being removed from its church. It was discovered in 1927 in a wood pile in a loft at Thornham Hall, belonging to a Suffolk landowner, Lord Henniker. He donated it to St Mary's Church, Thornham Parva, where his brother was parson.

The Thornham Parva Retable has eight panels of saints in niches surrounding a Crucifixion. The origins of the retable were a puzzle but the images provide clues. The figures pinpointed links with the Dominican Order. At either end are St Dominic and St Peter Martyr, joint patrons of the Dominicans. St Catherine and St Margaret of Antioch were the order's mascots. The Apostles Peter and Paul, who were believed to have spoken to St Dominic, all point towards Dominican interest. The presence of Edmund the Martyr suggests an East Anglian link. John the Baptist's figure might seem more obscure, but the benefactors of the Dominican Priory at Thetford, John de Warenne, 7th Earl of Surrey and Edmund Gonville would have expected their namesakes to be part of the finished painting.

== Related work ==
It is believed that an altar frontal now in the Musée de Cluny in Paris was once associated with the Thornham Parva retable as a single decorative fixture. The hypothesis is that they became separated when Henry VIII dissolved the Blackfriars, Thetford friary in 1538. The Thetford Priory contained a statue of the Virgin which was claimed to work miracles and the frontal shows scenes from the life of the Virgin.

== Restoration ==
The retable was returned to St Mary's Church, Thornham Parva, in 2003, following eight years of restoration by the Hamilton Kerr Institute in Cambridge. Using sturgeon glue, applied with tiny dabs of cotton buds, inch by inch the layers of grime were removed to reveal some of the original gold and a glowing autumnal palette of translucent reds, purples and greens which the original artist used. Deterioration of much of the original gold used meant that a significant portion was required to be replaced by new gold leaf.
