= Edward Clere (MP) =

English Member of Parliament (1536–1606)

Edward Clere (1536–1606) was an English landowner and politician, serving as Member of Parliament for Thetford and Grampound.

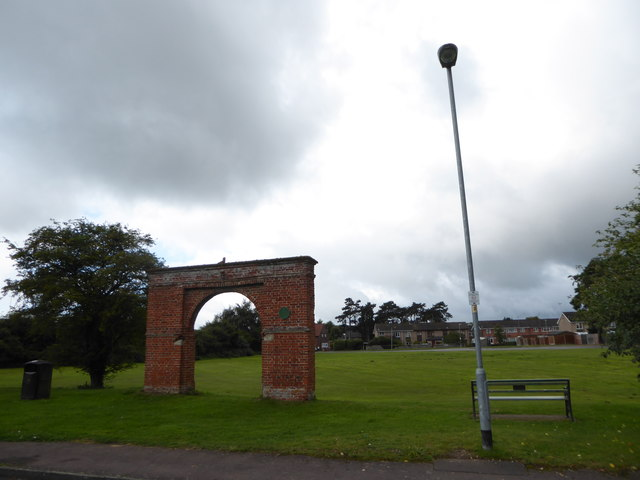
Site of Clere's house at The Place, Thetford

He was a son of John Clere of Ormesby. He was educated at the University of Louvain, Cambridge, and the Inner Temple. One of his older brothers died at Florence, and the other was killed at the battle of Pinkie in 1547. His father was killed fighting at Kirkwall in 1557. Clere inherited the manor of Blicking from Sir James Boleyn.

Edward Clere entertained Elizabeth at his house at the former St George's Priory, Thetford, during her Norfolk progress in 1578.

Clere wrote a description of the entertainment given to Elizabeth I at New Hall in September 1579 by the Earl of Sussex. She was greeted by a theatrical entertainment presenting Jupiter and a thunderstorm. The next day there was jousting. A sleeping knight was brought in a chariot led by a maiden, and appeared to be revived by the Queen. Elizabeth was given a horse, a cloak, and a riding safeguard for hunting the next day. In his letter to Bassingbourbe Gawdy, Clere explained the drama promoted the Anjou courtship.

Clere and Sir William Heydon had some responsibility for the defence of Norfolk in 1588.

He died in London and was buried at Blickling on 14 August 1606. His monument at St Andrews' Blickling has the heraldry of ten ancestors, claiming lineage from a spurious "Clere Monte", a companion of the Duke of Normandy.

Edward Clere's papers and correspondence were auctioned in lots in 1866 as part of the collection of Sir John Fenn.

== Marriages ==
Edward Clere married twice. Firstly, Frances, daughter of Sir Richard Fulmerston of Ipswich. She died in March 1579. Secondly, in 1580, Agnes, daughter of Robert Crane of Chilton. She was the widow of John Smith of Halesworth, Francis Clopton of Melford, and Christopher Heydon (died 1579) of Baconsthorpe. His children included:

- Edward Clere (born 1564). He married (1) Margaret Yaxley, and (2) Agnes, who sold Blickling to Henry Hobart in 1616.
- Francis Clere, knighted 1 July 1603, who married Elizabeth, daughter of Thomas Wroth, in May 1603.
- Fulmerston Clere
- Gilbert Clere
- Agnes or Anne Clere, who married William Gilbert.
- Temperance Clere (1564–1589).
