= Blackfriars, Thetford =

Former friary in England, now a school

Blackfriars, Thetford was a priory in Norfolk, England, which belonged to the Dominican Order. It was one of several religious houses in Thetford closed at the time of the Dissolution of the Monasteries. The site is now occupied by Thetford Grammar School.

== History ==
In 1335, Henry, 3rd Earl of Lancaster gave to the Order of Preachers the site of the abandoned cathedral of St Mary the Great, where for a time, the bishops of East Anglia once held their see. In the early 1100s, the Benedictines had established a small priory there for a brief time, before moving to the Norfolk side of the river. Little remained of the unfinished cloister.

The Thornham Parva Retable is believed to have been created by a workshop in Norwich in the 1330s for Thetford Priory. It is 12ft long and depicts the crucifixion with figures of the Virgin and St John flanked by eight panel paintings of saints set on a gilt background. It disappeared in the 16th century, but was discovered in 1927 and is now located at St Mary's Church, Thornham Parva.

In 1424 the friars granted to William Curteys, Benedictine prior of Bury St Edmunds Abbey, and his brethren the use of the best chamber of this house, called the 'common recreatory,' which was henceforth to be termed St Edmund's House; they were to occupy it as they liked, but not to grant or alienate it without the consent of the friars. This must have been a great convenience to the abbey of St Edmunds, as it held the patronage and was responsible for the lands of the adjacent nunnery of St George.

The surrender was signed by the prior, and five other friars, and the religious house destroyed in 1538. Part of the present Thetford Grammar School is built on the site of the Blackfriars Priory, which in turn was built on the original site of the Benedictine Thetford Priory. Sir Richard Fulmerston, by will dated in 1566, ordered his heirs to erect and establish a free grammar school in Thetford. Soon after Sir Richard's death, his heirs built a school-house upon one corner of the Black-Friars-Yard, with a chamber for the schoolmaster. The 16th century school building incorporates part of the church of the Dominican Priory and is still is use by Thetford Grammar School.

== Domus Dei ==
The hospital of Domus Dei (or God's House) was established sometime before 1319. In 1335, John de Warenne, 7th Earl of Surrey transferred it to Canons Regular of the Holy Sepulchre at Holy Sepulchre Priory. In 1347 Henry of Grosmont, the son of the founder of Blackfriars, was patron of the Domus Dei. He confirmed to the prior and canons the gift of the lands, tenements, and rents lately belonging to the hospital of God's House, but excepted the actual site of the hospital, which he conferred upon the Friars Preachers, which they were to maintain. The site of the Domus Dei, stood between their cloister and the High Street, and hence this friars' house was often termed the priory of the Maison-Dieu or God's House.

== See also ==
- Thornham Parva Retable, a mediaeval altarpiece believed to have originated at Blackfriars, Thetford

=== Other mediaeval ecclesiastical foundations in Thetford ===
- Austin Friars, Thetford, Southeast of Thetford Castle
- Holy Sepulchre Priory, Thetford, between Brandon Road and River Little Ouse
- St George's Priory, Thetford, at the site of the British Trust for Ornithology South of Nuns Bridges Road
- Thetford Priory, dedicated to St Mary, on the North (Norfolk) side of the River Little Ouse (to which it moved from an earlier site which became the Blackfriars establishment)
