= Hamilton Kerr Institute =

Conservation branch of the Fitzwilliam Museum in England

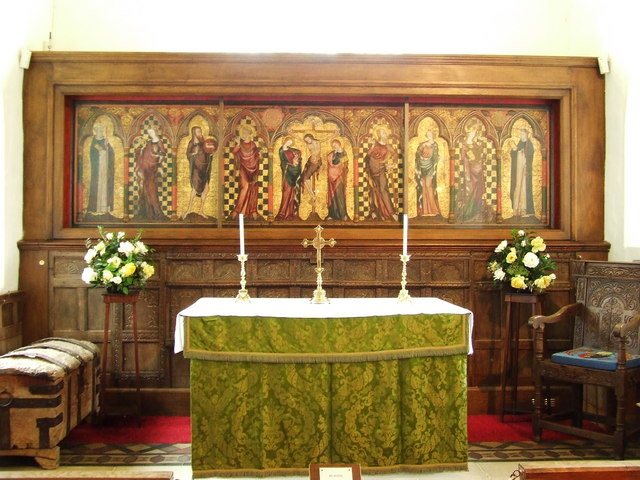
The Thornham Parva Retable

The Hamilton Kerr Institute is a branch of the Fitzwilliam Museum in Cambridgeshire, England, dedicated to the study and conservation of easel paintings. It is also part of the University of Cambridge.

== Facilities and logistics ==
The institute was founded in 1976 through grants from the Baring Foundation, the Esmée Fairbairn Trust, the Gulbenkian Foundation, the Isaac Wolfson Foundation, the Monument Trust, and the Pilgrim Trust, and continues to finance itself through income from its work and its endowment fund. It is housed in a riverside property, donated by Hamilton Kerr, seven miles south of Cambridge in the village of Whittlesford. The premises consist of a mid-eighteenth century house and converted mill buildings, containing offices and a scientific laboratory, restoration studios, studios for panel treatment and the relining of canvases, and studios for photography. In 1980, the institute opened a studio in London.

== Notable restoration accomplishments ==
- The Westminster Retable: 1998–2004. The Westminster Retable of ca. 1270 was the main altarpiece for Westminster Abbey during pre-Reformation England. When it was rediscovered in the 18th century, several poorly executed restoration attempts damaged the retable. In 1998, the institute acquired this work, and began work on repairing and restoring it.
- The Thornham Parva Retable. This 15-ft long medieval altarpiece was restored after an eight-year plan. Estimated to be worth millions, the altarpiece is thought to have been created in the 1330s for a Dominican Priory in Norfolk. It now stands in a protective glass case in St Mary's Church, Thornham Parva in Suffolk.

== List of major donors ==
The following have made donations:

- Council for the Care of Churches
- J. Paul Getty Trust
- Idlewild Trust
- Samuel H. Kress Foundation
- Paul Mellon Centre
- Queen Elizabeth Scholarship Trust
- Rayne Foundation
- Woodmansterne Publications Ltd
- Worshipful Company of Painter-Stainers
- National Association of Decorative and Fine Arts Societies
