= Historia compendiosa de regibus Britonum =

Start of the Historia compendiosa in Arundel 220

The Historia compendiosa de regibus Britonum is an anonymous Latin history of Britain from the legendary arrival of Brutus of Troy until AD 689. It was written in England in the 13th or 14th century and survives in two early 14th-century manuscripts in the British Library: Arundel 220 and Cotton Julius D.vi.

The Historia compendiosa is mostly an abridged version of Geoffrey of Monmouth's Historia regum Britanniae with some additions from the work of Ralph of Diceto. The author also refers to a source as haec Brome (or Bream) or de compendio Brome in passages drawn from Geoffrey. This was taken by John Bale and Thomas Tanner to refer to a historical compilation by a certain "Bromus", identified with John Bramis, a 14th-century friar who translated the Roman de Waldef. It is more likely that it refers to an earlier abridgement of Geoffrey of Monmouth.

In his Historia Britannicae, Saxonicae, Anglo-Danicae scriptores quindecim of 1691, Thomas Gale misattributed the Historia compendiosa to Diceto.
