= Rushford, Norfolk =

Village in Norfolk, England

Coordinates: 52.397017°N 0.827932°E

Rushford
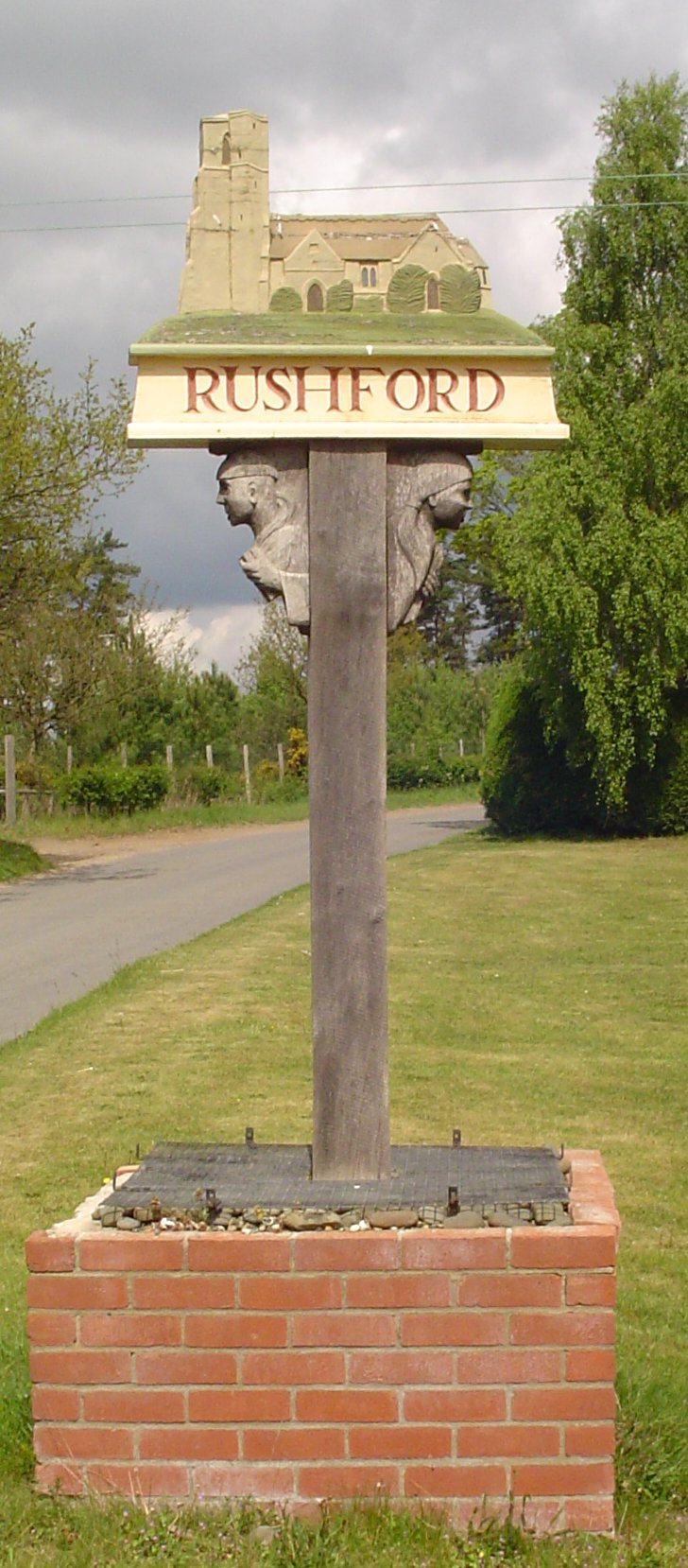
- Signpost in Rushford

- Location within Norfolk
- OS grid reference: TL925814
- Civil parish: Brettenham
- District: Breckland
- Shire county: Norfolk
- Region: East
- Country: England
- Sovereign state: United Kingdom
- Post town: Thetford
- Postcode district: IP24

Rushford is a small village in the civil parish of Brettenham, in the Breckland district, in the county of Norfolk, England. It is situated on the north bank of the River Little Ouse, 3 1/2 miles (5.6 km) east of the town of Thetford and south of the main A1066 road. The river forms the boundary between Norfolk and Suffolk and, until 1894, Rushford was in both counties. Rushford Hall is south of the river and thus in Suffolk. In 1931 the parish had a population of 94. On 1 April 1935 the parish was abolished and merged with Brettenham.

Filming for the film Witchfinder General starring Vincent Price and Ian Ogilvy took place here in 1967.

The village's name means 'Rush enclosure'.

== Notable residents ==
- Sir John Cheke, tutor to King Edward VI, was granted Rushford, which was a royal manor, by the King.
- Edmund Gonville, a founder of Gonville and Caius College, was rector of Rushford from 1326 to 1342 and founded Rushworth College here.
