= Black Horse Tavern =

Black Horse Tavern may refer to:

- Black Horse Tavern (Old Saybrook, Connecticut)
- Black Horse Tavern (Belfast, Maine)
- Black Horse Tavern (Gettysburg, Pennsylvania)
- Black Horse Tavern (Canonsburg, Pennsylvania)
- Black Horse Tavern-Bellvue Hotel and Office, Roanoke, Virginia
