= Roman de Waldef =

A page from Waldef (Cod. Bodmer 168)

The Roman de Waldef (English Romance of Waldef, Latin Historia regis Waldei), commonly called Waldef for short, is an anonymous insular French romance in 22,306 octosyllabic lines of verse. Written in the first decade of the 13th century, it "provides a foundation myth for East Anglia" based on the adventures of a king named Waldef.

== Synopsis ==
The prologue to Waldef defines it as an estoire (history). The claim to historicity led some readers to link the title character with Early Waltheof of Northumbria. The claim to historicity is spurious, and it is generally agreed that Waldef is a work of fiction. It is set sometime between the end of Roman rule in Britain in 410 and the Norman conquest of England in 1066. The French text is incomplete, the ending being lost.

Waldef starts by tracing the history of Norfolk in Roman times down to the death of Waldef's father, King Bede. When Bede dies, his seneschal seizes the throne and marries the queen, forcing young Waldef to flee to King Morgan of Normandy. When he is an adult, he returns, kills the usurper and takes back his throne. After defeating the rival kings of Oxford and London in battle, he marries Ernild, daughter of the king of Lincoln.

During his absence, his kingdom is invaded by Urvein, king of Sweden. He appeals for aid to the kings of Narborough, Brancaster, Colchester, Thetford and Cambridge, but they refuse. The king of Tasburgh comes to aid and they make an alliance with Urvein to ravage the lands of the kings who refused to help. When Waldef does not attend a feast held by the king of London, the king sends an army against Thetford. Waldef is victorious, but his wife and sons, Guiac and Gudlac, are captured by Saracen pirates. Ernild is brought to Denmark, while Guiac and Gudlac are sold as slaves to the kings of Cologne and Morocco, respectively.

While rescuing his wife, a series of adventures takes Waldef to Poitou, Valencia (where he is briefly imprisoned), Denmark and Dublin. Guiac, meanwhile, becomes a commander under King Conrad of Cologne, helping defeat the pagan Saxons. Gudlac escapes Morocco and helps Denmark defeat the Norwegians. The two brothers then sail with their fleets to England to assist Fergus, king of London, against Waldef and his allies. Gudlac marries Fergus's daughter. Single combat between Waldef and Guiac is averted only at the last moment, when an angel reveals his identity to Ernild.

Against the wishes of Waldef and Ernild, Guiac and Gudlac leave home to make conquests abroad, taking with them their second cousin Lioine. After the death of Conrad, Guiac is elected king of Cologne. He defeats the Saxons a second time. The Saxons appeal to the German emperor Alexis, but Guiac defeats him and besieges him in Worms. Lioine falls in love with the emperor's daughter, who resides in a tower that can only be reached by swimming across a river. He is sent out to sea, however, and drowns. When his body washes ashore, the princess dies beside him.

When the emperor finally surrender, Guiac succeeds him. He intends to conquer Rome, Greece, the Holy Land and the Earthly Paradise. A pilgrim appears to warn him of God's anger at his presumption. News then arrives that Fergus left his kingdom to his daughter, but his nephews have seized it with the help of Hunewald, a giant from Ireland. Waldef has been killed and all his castle taken save Attleborough, Tasburgh and Thetford. Taking this as evidence fo divine disfavour, Guiac hands back the empire to Alexis while Gudlac prepares to return to England to fight Hunewald.

Start of part two in the Latin translation of Bramis

The original French text ends at this point, but the longer Latin version continues. This continuation may not reflect the original ending. According to the Latin, Gudlac kills Hunewald, gathers an army and defeats Fergus's nephews to take control of his wife's kingdom. Guiac, meanwhile, wanders as a beggar and penitent as far as Babylon. After eight years, an angel tells him to return to Germany, where he is elected to succeed the dead Alexis. He returns to England to see Guiac and they both cross back to Germany to lift a siege of Cologne by invaders from the East. Guiac goes on to conquer Greece and then Rome. Greece his bestows on his nephew, Richer, while he has himself crowned emperor of Rome.

== Date and authorship ==
Waldef can be dated only approximately to the first decade of the 13th century. The main clue to its date is its language. It is not a response to any particular historical events, although its tale of kings clashing with their sons and kings seeking conquest abroad fits well the period of the Angevin Empire.

The anonymous author claims to be translating an English work at the instigation of an unnamed lady. He calls her ma duce amie (my sweet love). The claim that he is working from English sources is unsubstantiated, but he does appear to have been well read in English literature. His claim to a lady patron may also be a fictional device, since he promises to name her at the end of the work but never does. The anonymity of the author is not unusual, but that of the patron is.

The author of Waldef was familiar with East Anglia, although he deliberately distorts its geography for literary purposes when he places Thetford on the coast.

== Manuscripts ==
The French Waldef survives in a single manuscript, now codex 168 in the Bodmer Library. The manuscript contains notes from later readers, including a lady-in-waiting of Queen Elizabeth Woodville. Two Latin translations of Waldef were made in the fifteenth century. The fuller translation was made by John Bramis. It is preserved in manuscript Cambridge, Corpus Christi College, MS 32. The other Latin version is abbreviated and anonymous. It is found in the manuscript Dublin, Trinity College, MS 632.

== Bibliography ==
- Djordjević, Ivana; Clifton, Nicole; Weiss, Judith, eds. (2021). Waldef: A French Romance from Medieval England. ARC Humanities Press. doi:10.1515/9781641894074. ISBN 978-1-64189-407-4.
- Field, Rosalind (2000). "Waldef and the Matter of/with England". In Judith Weiss; Jennifer Fellows; Morgan Dickson (eds.). Medieval Insular Romance: Translation and Innovation. D. S. Brewer. pp. 25–39.
- Field, Rosalind (2017). "Roman de Waldef, Le". In Siân Echard; Robert Rouse (eds.). The Encyclopedia of Medieval Literature in Britain. John Wiley & Sons. pp. 1–2. doi:10.1002/9781118396957.wbemlb141. ISBN 978-1-118-39698-8.
- Ham, Edward B. (1935). "The Language of the Roman de Waldef". Medium Ævum. 4 (3): 176–193. doi:10.2307/43625960. JSTOR 43625960.
- Smyly, J. G. (1919). "The Romance of Waldef". Hermathena. 18 (41): 240–328. JSTOR 23036939.
