= Thetford Priory =

Monastic house in Norfolk, England

Coordinates: 52.4165°N 0.742382°E

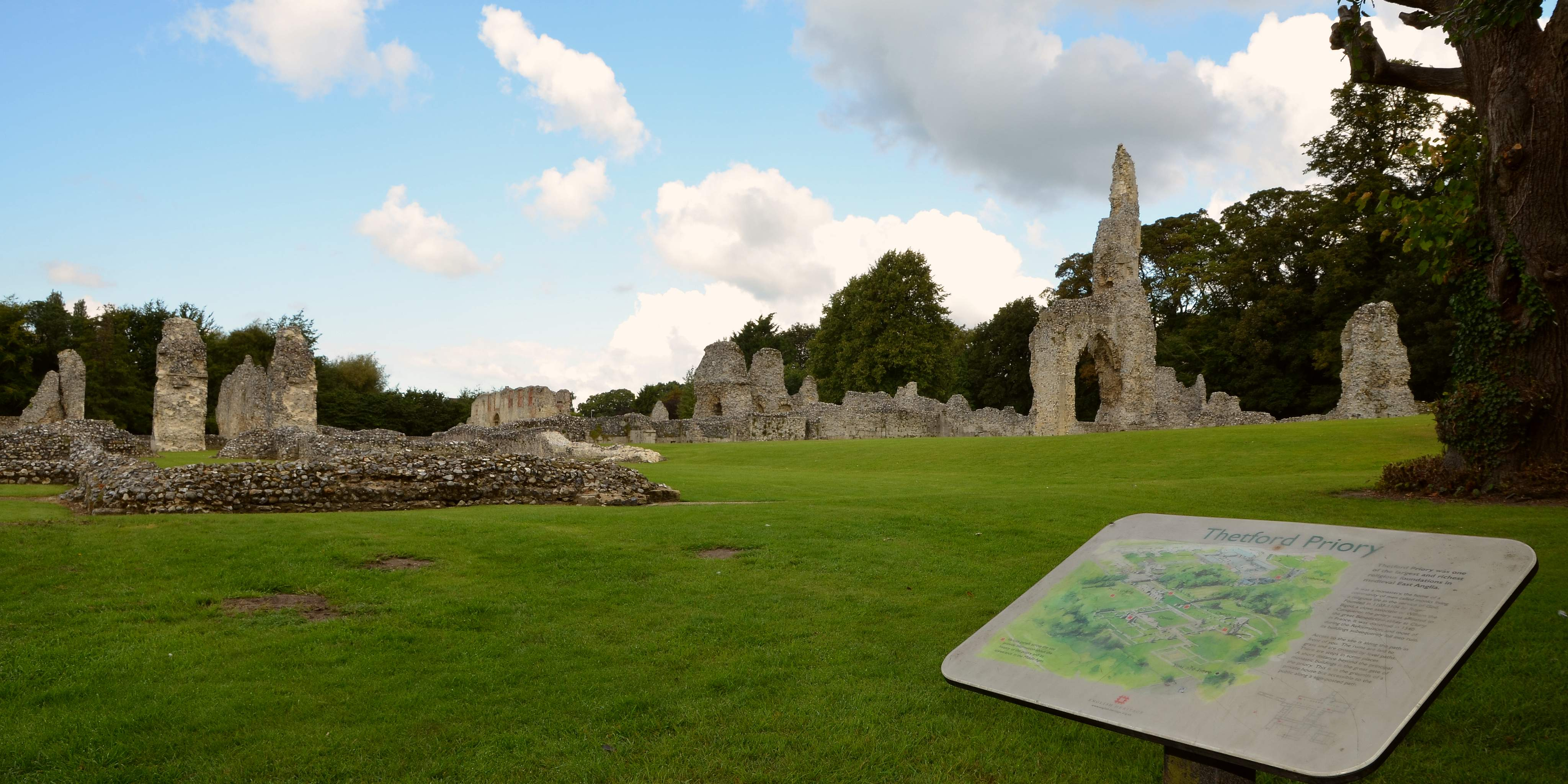
The remains of Thetford Priory with English Heritage information board in September 2017

Thetford Priory is a Cluniac monastic house in Thetford, Norfolk, England. Founded in 1103 by Roger Bigod of Norfolk, Thetford was one of the most important monasteries of East Anglia.

== History ==
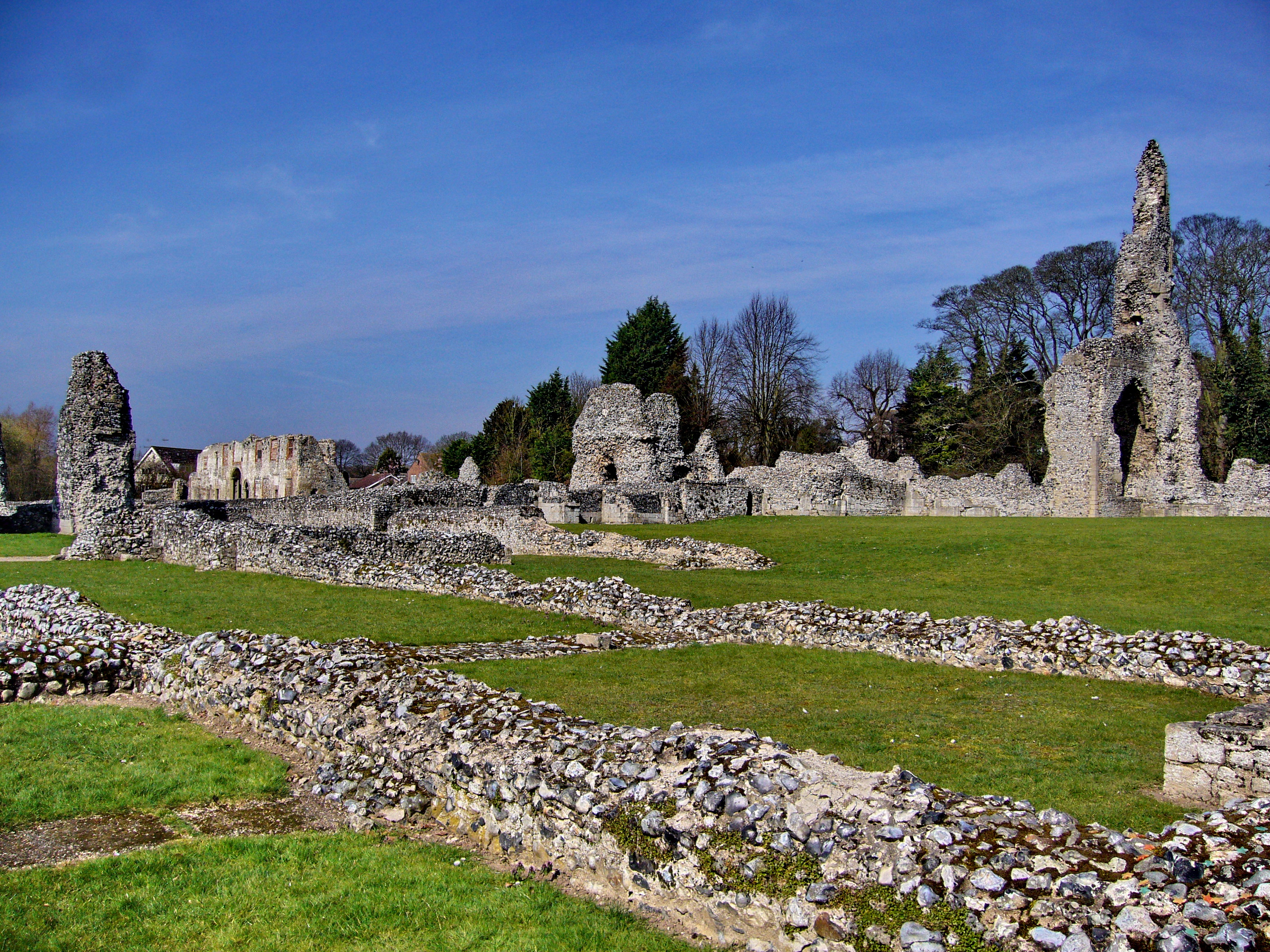
Thetford Priory

One of the most important East Anglian monasteries, Thetford Priory was founded in 1103 by Roger Bigod of Norfolk, in lieu of a vow of pilgrimage to the Holy Land. The abandoned cathedral church of the East Anglian bishops, on the Suffolk side of the River Little Ouse, was at first selected as the church of the new priory, dedicated to the Blessed Virgin. A cloister or cells of woodwork were erected for the accommodation of the monks, and Benedictines from the Priory of St Pancras in Lewes arrived in 1104.

Three years later, a new prior realized that the monastic site, surrounded by the houses of the burghers, was inconveniently overcrowded, with no room for a guest-house. Bigod then gave them a pleasant and open site on the other side of the river in the county of Norfolk. The monks relocated to their new premises on St. Martin's Day, 1114.

In the 13th century, the Virgin Mary is said to have appeared in a vision to locals requesting the addition to the site of a Lady Chapel. During its construction, an old statue of her from their former site was discovered to have a hollow in its head concealing saints' relics, and became a magnet for pilgrims. In a 1390 visitation, visitors from Cluny found that there were then twenty-two monks; six daily masses, three of which were sung; and that tenth part of the bread was reserved for distribution to the poor. The visitors found that all monastic obligations according to the Cluny rule were duly observed.

During the time of the Dissolution of the Monasteries, a formal complaint was raised by the Mayors and burgesses of Thetford to Thomas Cromwell in 1539, arguing that many of the town's inhabitants would fall into extreme poverty because their livelihoods depended on pilgrims visiting the priory. Henry VIII rejected a plan proposed by Thomas Howard, 3rd Duke of Norfolk to convert the priory into a collegiate church. The dean was to be Prior William, and the six prebendaries and eight secular canons were to be the monks of the former house. Thetford Priory was closed down in 1540 and fell into the possession of the Duke of Norfolk.

== Description ==
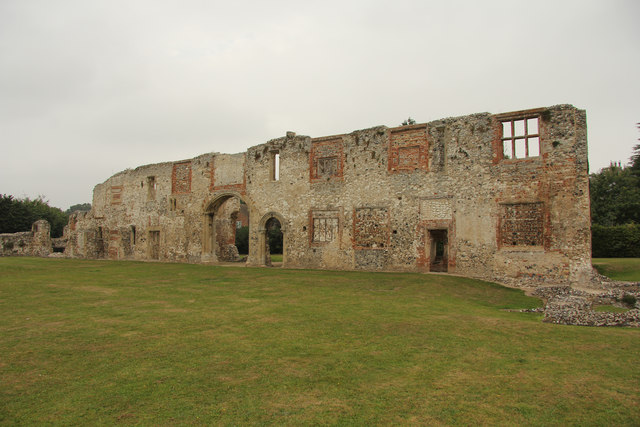
The Prior's Lodging

It housed the tombs of the Howard dynasty, of Henry FitzRoy, 1st Duke of Richmond and Somerset, and of other early Tudor Dynasty officials. Even this could not save the priory from the Dissolution of the Monasteries and, on its closure in 1540 (it was one of the last priories to be dissolved), the Howard tombs were removed to St Michael the Archangel, Framlingham, close to the family's Framlingham Castle.

The Prior’s Lodging was converted into a house which was occupied until the early 18th century.

Its ruins (including the lower walls of the church and cloister, along with the impressive shell of the priors' lodging and, reached by a pathway from the main site, an almost complete 14th-century gatehouse) are open to the public as an English Heritage site. The priory and gatehouse are Grade I listed buildings. The ruins are reputedly haunted and were the subject of an episode of the television series Ghosthunters.

== Priors ==
- Malgod, appointed 1104
- Stephen, appointed 1107
- Constantine, occurs 1131
- Martin, occurs 1189
- Peter Vincent, occurs 1202
- Richard, occurs 1226, died c. 1236 (fn. 59)
- Stephen II, occurs 1240, killed 1248 (fn. 61)
- William I, occurs 1262
- Vincent, occurs 1279, died c. 1300 (fn. 64)
- Reginald de Montargi alias de Eye, elected c. 1300
- Ralph de Frezenfeld, appointed 1302
- Thomas Bigod, appointed 1304
- William de Ventodoro, appointed 1308
- Martin de Rinhiaco, appointed 1311
- Peter de Bosco, appointed 1316
- James de Cusancia, occurs 1336
- Geoffrey de Rochario, occurs 1355
- Roger de Berton, occurs 1370
- John de Fordham, occurs 1372, 1395
- John Ixworth, appointed c. 1400
- Nicholas, appointed 1430
- John Vesey, appointed 1438
- Robert Weting, appointed 1480
- Roger Baldry de Bermingham, appointed 1503
- William Ixworth, appointed 1518, last prior.

== Local context ==
The Church of the Holy Sepulchre, another Grade I listed building, and originally part of another medieval monastery, is 300 metres to the south, directly across the River Little Ouse.

== Burials ==
- Roger Bigod of Norfolk
- Hugh Bigod, 1st Earl of Norfolk
- Roger Bigod, 2nd Earl of Norfolk
- John Howard, 1st Duke of Norfolk (originally buried here)
- Thomas Howard, 2nd Duke of Norfolk (originally buried here)
- Anne of York (daughter of Edward IV) (originally buried here)
- John de Mowbray, 3rd Duke of Norfolk
- Henry FitzRoy, Duke of Richmond and Somerset (originally buried here)

== See also ==
- Alien priory
- John Bramis
- Wangford Priory
- List of monastic houses in Norfolk
- List of abbeys and priories in England

=== Other mediaeval ecclesiastical foundations in Thetford ===
- Austin Friars, Thetford, Southeast of Thetford Castle
- Blackfriars, Thetford at the site of Thetford Grammar School
- Holy Sepulchre Priory, Thetford between Brandon Road and River Little Ouse
- St George's Priory, Thetford at the site of the British Trust for Ornithology South of Nuns Bridges Road
