= Jim Bacon (weather forecaster) =

British television weather forecaster

James Dale Bacon (born 22 June 1950) is a British television weather forecaster, who appeared on national forecasts (BBC1) in the 1980s, with his distinct East Anglian accent. After leaving the BBC he took over as a Design and Technology technician in South-east London.

== Early life ==
He was born in Suffolk. He went to primary school in Feltwell in King's Lynn and West Norfolk, near the Suffolk boundary in the south-west of Norfolk, then attended Thetford Grammar School.

== Career ==
He became a meteorologist in 1968. He started out on RAF stations in East Anglia. He then worked for the Met Office, where he programmed supercomputers. He worked as a forecaster at London Stansted Airport, then did a degree in Meteorology at the University of Reading, a university renowned for its meteorology department. He then worked at the London Weather Centre, becoming a senior forecaster.

=== Television ===
Whilst at London, he worked for national television and radio as a forecaster, in the days of magnetic symbols. In 1986 he left national television to join the Anglia TV weather forecasting team, where he worked until 1997.

In the 2000s and 2010s he appeared on BBC Look East as one of their forecasting team. He retired in 2019.
