= James Pattinson (author) =

English author (1915–2009)

James Pattinson (15 December 1915 - 18 October 2009) was an English author of more than 100 thrillers.

== Life ==
James Pattinson was raised in the village of East Harling, Norfolk. He attended Thetford Grammar School.

He volunteered for the Royal Artillery in 1939, and in 1941 was transferred to the maritime arm to serve as a gunner on DEMS. He served on convoys to Russia, in the Mediterranean and the Atlantic.

After the war he returned to poultry farming in Norfolk and began work on his first book in 1950.

He was unmarried.

== Bibliography ==
Many of Pattinson's novels were based on his experience as a gunner on the Arctic convoys in World War II. His first published work was Soldier, Go North in 1954 and his last was The Unknown in 2008.

- Soldier, Sail North (1954)
- Last In Convoy (1958)
- Contact Mr. Delgado (1959)
- The Rodriguez Affair (1970)
- The Murmansk Assignment (1971)
- The Sinister Stars (1971)
- Watching Brief (1971)
- Ocean Prize (1972)
- The Marakano Formula (1973)
- The Petronov Plan (1974)
- Special Delivery (1976)
- The Honeymoon Caper (1976)
- The Spanish Hawk (1977)
- The Courier Job (1979)
- Lethal Orders (1982)
- A Fatal Errand (1982)
- The Stalking Horse (1982)
- Flight to the Sea (1983)
- Kavulu Lion (1983)
- Car for Mr. Bradley (1983)
- Precious Cargo (1984)
- The Saigon Merchant (1984)
- Dead of Winter (1984)
- Come Home, Toby Brown (1985)
- Life Preserver (1985)
- Homecoming (1985)
- Poisoned Chalice (1986)
- Where the Money Is (1986)
- Soldier, Sail North (1987)
- A Dream of Madness (1987)
- The Junk Run (1988)
- Paradise in the Sun (1988)
- Killer (1989)
- Dishonour Among Thieves (1989)
- Operation Zenith (1989)
- Wild Justice (1989)
- The Spoilers (1990)
- Dead Men Rise Up Never (1990)
- With Menaces (1991)
- Devil Under the Skin (1991)
- The Animal Gang (1992)
- Steel (1992)
- The Emperor Stone (1993)
- Fat Man from Colombia (1993)
- Bavarian Sunset (1993)
- The Telephone Murders (1994)
- Lady from Argentina (1994)
- The Poison Traders (1995)
- Squeaky Clean (1995)
- Avenger of Blood (1996)
- A Wind on the Heath (1996)
- One-way Ticket (1997)
- The Time of Your Life (1997)
- Some Job (1998)
- The Wild One (1999)
- Skeleton Island (1999)
- A Passage of Arms (2000)
- Old Pal's Act (2001)
- Crane (2001)
- Obituary for Howard Gray (2003)
- Bullion (2004)
- The Unknown (2008)
