= John Bramis =

English Augustinian friar and writer

Opening of the Historia regis Waldei in Cambridge CCC 329

John Bramis or Bramus (14th century) was an English Augustinian friar and writer.

Bramis was attached to Thetford Priory. He translated the Roman de Waldef from French metre into Latin prose under the title Historia regis Waldei. This romance was originally written in English verse, and had been done into French at the desire of a lady.

A historical compilation entitled Historia compendiosa de regibus Britonum, and attributed to Ralph de Diceto, was printed in Thomas Gale, Quindecim Scriptores. The author repeatedly refers to a former compilation of Bromus; the work derives in fact from Geoffrey of Monmouth. The Oxford Dictionary of National Biography rejects the identification of Bromus with Bramis that had been made by John Bale and Thomas Tanner.
