= Black Horse (legend) =

Legend from Quebec, Canada

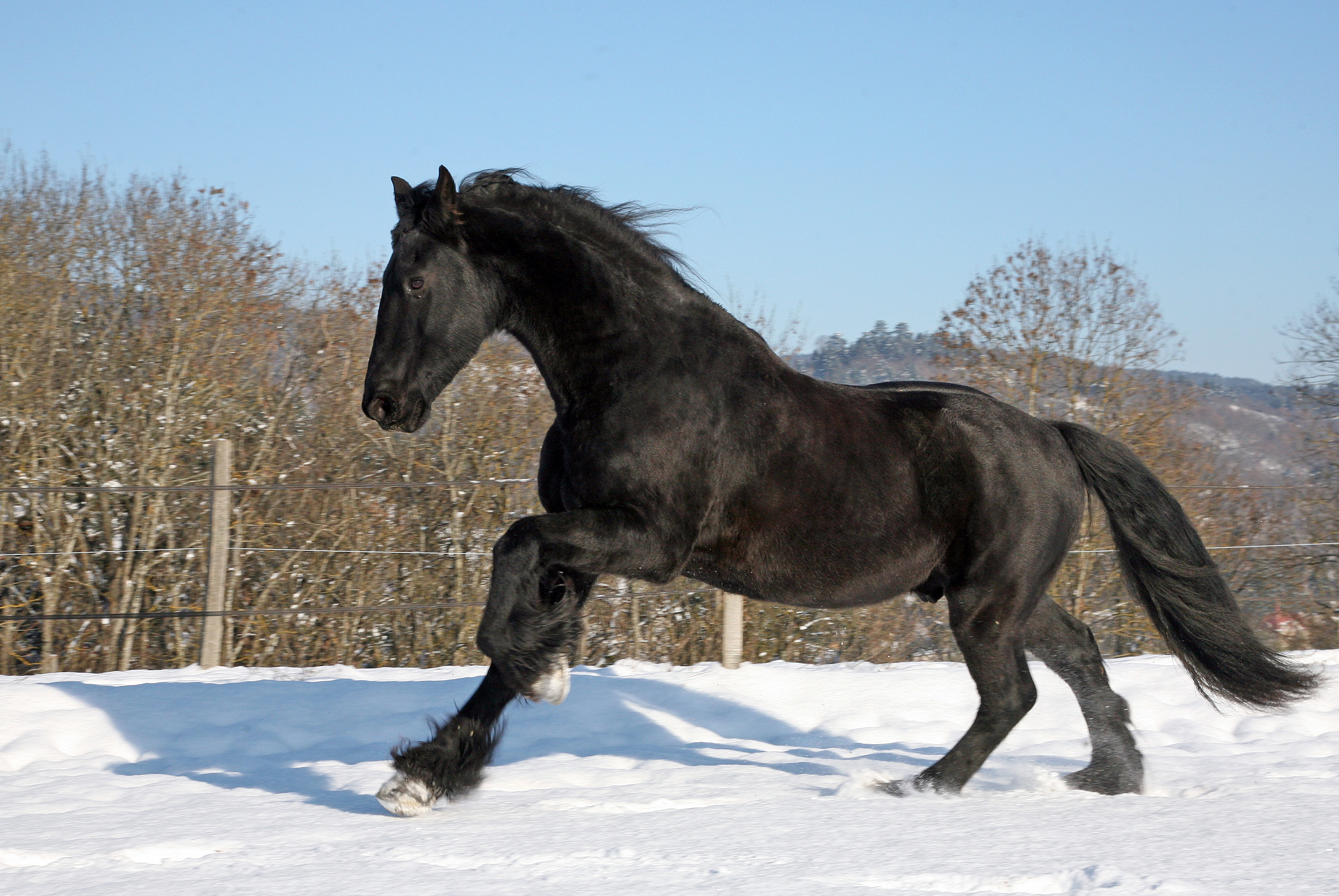
A black horse; protagonist of the story of the demon that builds churches in Quebec.

The black horse builder (French: Constructeur de chevaux noir) is a traditional oral story of Quebec and the other regions of French Canada, as well as places French Canadians emigrated. It has many variants, but most often it is about a magnificent black horse, or more rarely a white horse, which helps to build a chapel, church, or cathedral.

== Description ==
Impressed by the courage of the animal, a worker removes its bridle. The construction of the building is interrupted when it is almost complete and the horse flees, suggesting that it is the devil. A stone is still missing at the top of the religious building.

This story is to be found on both sides of the Saint Lawrence River, and especially at Saint-Augustin-de-Desmaures, Saint-Michel-de-Bellechasse, Saint-Laurent-de-l'Île-d'Orléans, Trois-Pistoles, Quebec, L'Islet, Quebec and in the other regions of Quebec. It also exists in a French quarter of Saint Boniface in Manitoba. The association of the devil and a black horse is frequently found in Québécois imagery. This may be connected with the morals of the Catholic Church and the fear of a meeting with the devil.
