= Rushworth College =

Defunct college in Norfolk, England

The College of Saint John the Evangelist of Rushworth, commonly called Rushworth College, was a college in the present-day village of Rushford in Norfolk. It was founded in 1342 by Edmund Gonville, the original founder of Gonville and Caius College, Cambridge, as a small community of priests dedicated to saying chantries for Gonville and his heirs. The college existed until the English Reformation when its lands and endowment were subsumed into Gonville Hall.
