= Black Horse Tavern (Canonsburg, Pennsylvania) =

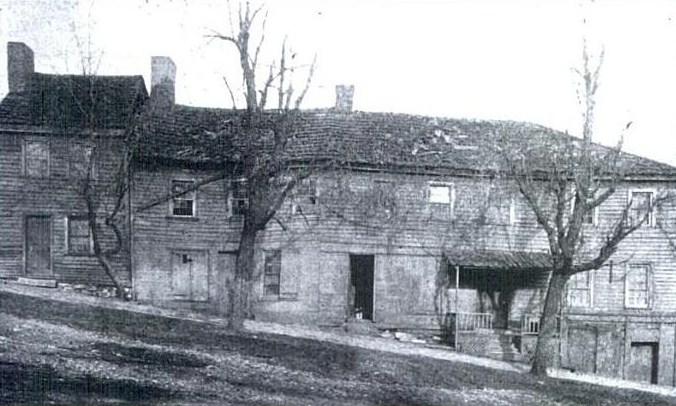
- Photograph of The Black Horse Tavern
- Interactive map of the Black Horse Tavern area

General information
- Location: Canonsburg, Pennsylvania
- Coordinates: 40°15′04″N 80°11′32″W
- Opened: 1794
- Demolished: ca. 1910
- Owner: Henry Westbay (founder)

Black Horse Tavern was a historic tavern in Canonsburg, Pennsylvania.

Black Horse Tavern was founded in 1794 by Henry Westbay, a native of Ireland. That year, during the early stages of the Whiskey Rebellion, the rebels met at the Black Horse Tavern to plan attacks on federal forces. Leaders of the rebellion intercepted federal mail between Philadelphia and federal troops at the tavern.

Some sources identify the Black Horse Tavern as the birthplace of the Whiskey Rebellion. Other sources are less certain on the role of the tavern in the rebellion, ascribing the tavern's prominent role in the Whiskey Rebellion to "local tradition." By 1795, Westbay opened a "nailing business" at the location. In 1814, he sold the tavern and moved to nearby Washington.

The tavern was located northwest of Daily House, on the road between Budd's Ferry on the Youghiogheny River to McFarlen's Ferry on Monongahela River.

The remains of the tavern were removed to make room for the new Canonsburg High School.
