= Black Horse, Thetford =

Black Horse
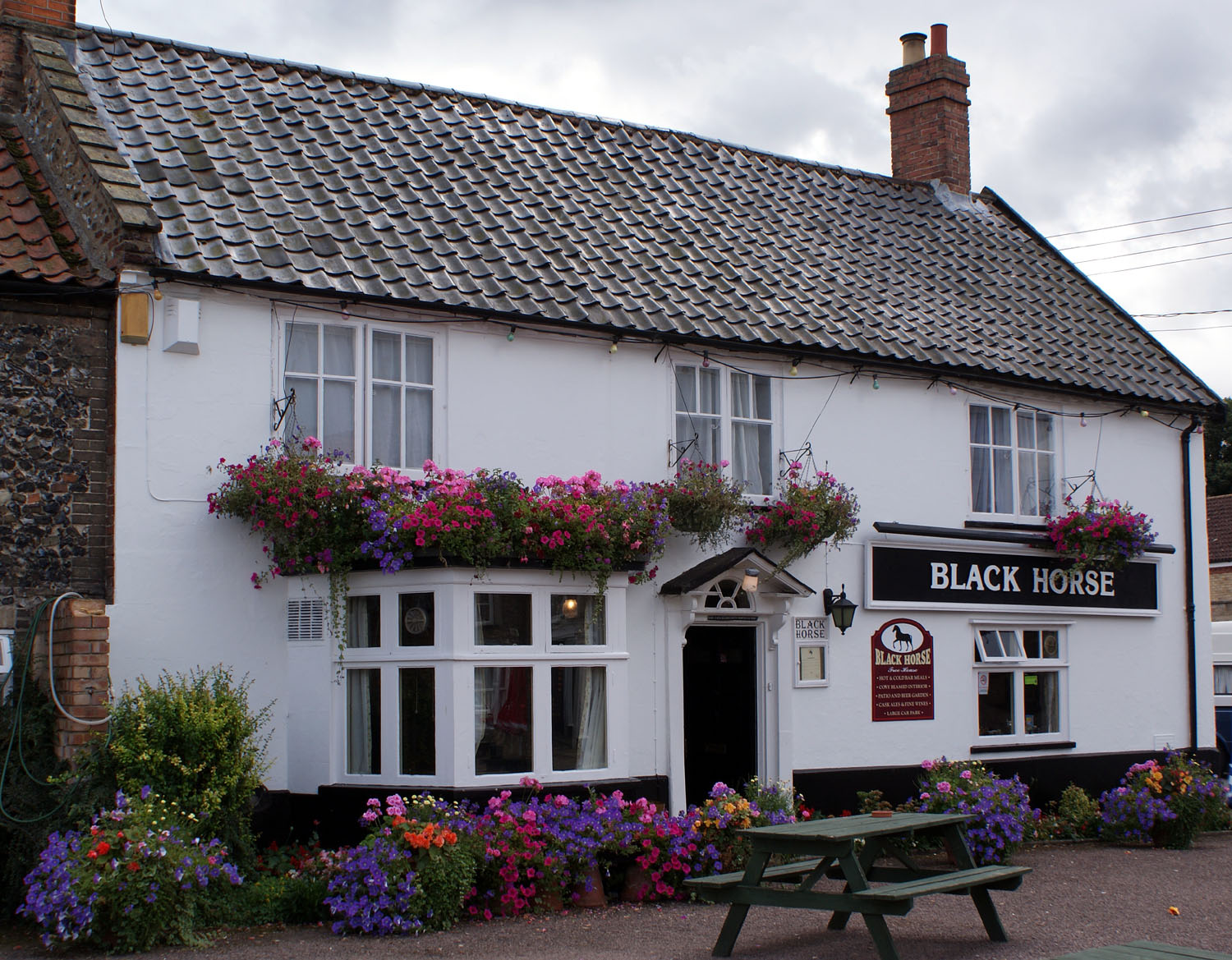
- The pub in August 2013
- Interactive map of the Black Horse area

General information
- Type: Pub
- Location: 64 Magdalen Street, Thetford, England
- Coordinates: 52.4145°N 0.7536°E
- Construction started: Mid 18th century

Listed Building – Grade II
- Official name: Black Horse Public House
- Designated: 10 March 1971
- Reference no.: 1297894

The Black Horse is a grade II listed pub in Thetford, Norfolk, England. It dates from the mid 18th century and is constructed of flint, clunch and brick, with a colour wash over plaster, and a roof of black-glazed pantiles.

It was modified and enlarged in the 19th and 20th centuries when the rooms on the ground floor were knocked into one.

Beer was brewed on the premises until the 1860s (latterly by the proprietor, a Mr John W. Tyrell), when the pub was sold to Bidwell and Company, then Thetford's largest brewers. Between 1928 and 1936, the publican was G Sweeney. As of 2015, the pub is run as a free house.

The building was given Grade II designation by English Heritage (now Historic England), protecting it from unauthorised development or demolition, on 10 March 1971.
