= St Mary's Church, Thornham Parva =

Coordinates: 52.3114°N 1.0926°E

Church of St Mary
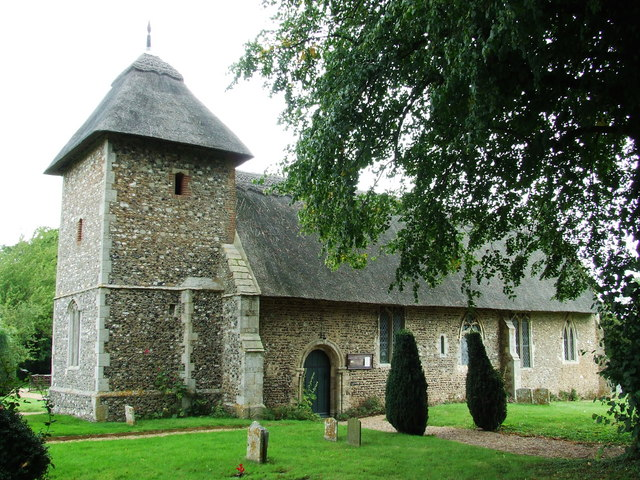
- Church of St Mary
- OS grid reference: TM 10908 72644
- Location: Eye, Suffolk
- Country: England
- Denomination: Church of England
- Previous denomination: Roman Catholic

History
- Status: Active

Architecture
- Functional status: Parish church
- Heritage designation: Grade I listed
- Designated: 1955

Administration
- Diocese: St Edmundsbury and Ipswich

St Mary's Church is a medieval church in Thornham Parva, Suffolk, England. Much of the fabric dates from the 12th century, and it is a Grade I listed building. Originally the church served not only Thornham Parva but the neighbouring village of Thornham Magna, which is now a separate parish.

A church on the site was recorded in the Domesday Book of 1086, and there are still traces of Anglo-Saxon stonework in the present building. The roof is thatched. Inside the building are early-14th-century wall paintings—on the south wall the early years of Christ and on the north wall the martyrdom of St Edmund. The church also houses a famous altarpiece, the Thornham Parva Retable, which is thought to have been created in the 1330s for a Dominican priory, probably Blackfriars, Thetford.

The architect Basil Spence died in 1976 at his home at Yaxley, Suffolk, and was buried at Thornham Parva. The graves of Dame Anne Warburton, the first female British ambassador, the violinist, Frederick Grinke, and Gareth Jones, "founding father" of the English law of restitution, also lie within the churchyard.
