= Edmund Gonville =

Founder of Gonville Hall

- Died: 1351
- Known for: Founder of Gonville Hall, Cambridge
- Parent: William de Gonvile

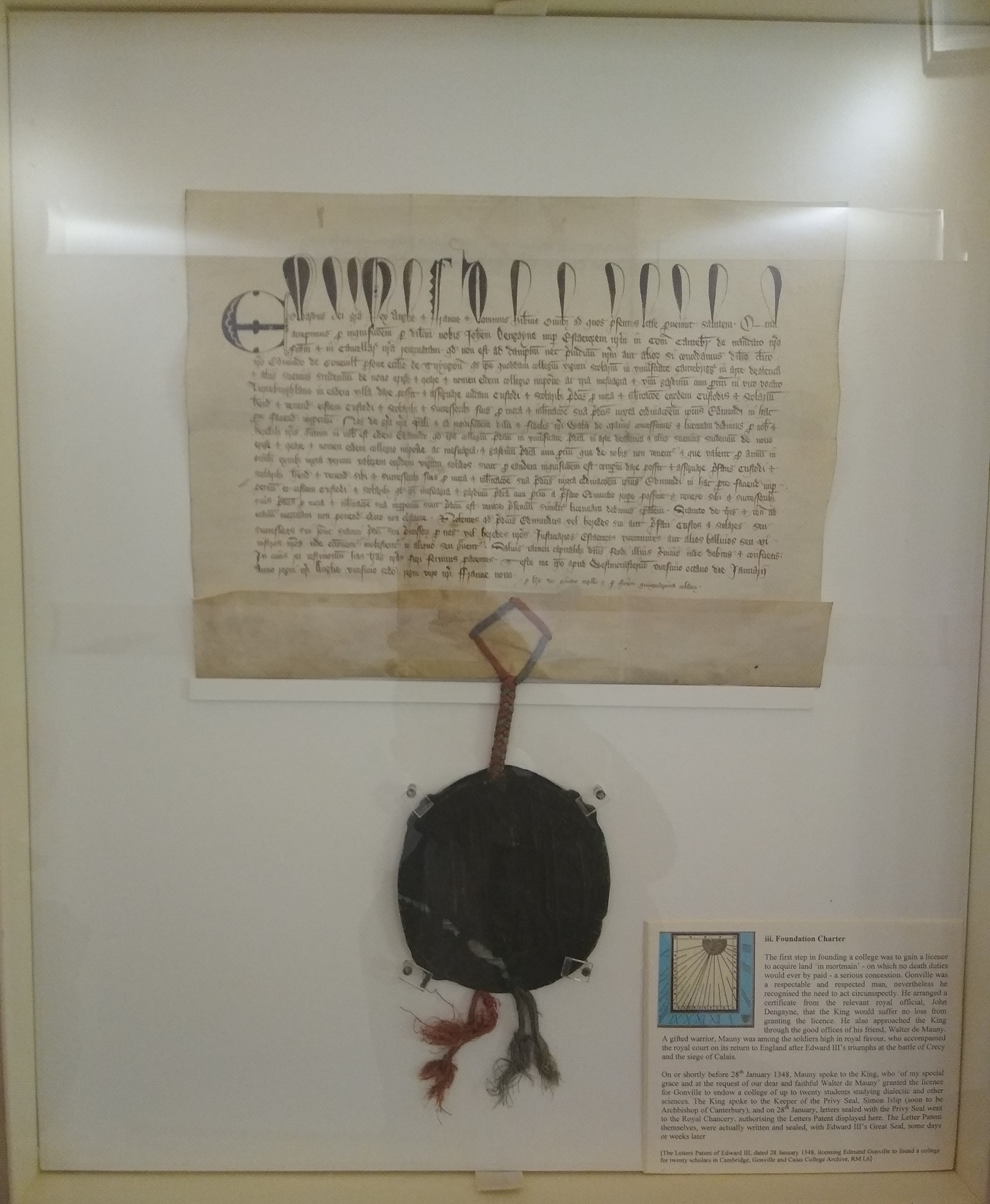
The 1348 foundation charter of Gonville Hall

Edmund Gonville (died 1351) was an English priest who founded Gonville Hall at the University of Cambridge in 1348, which later was re-founded by John Caius to become Gonville and Caius College, Cambridge. Gonville Hall was his third foundation. Before this he had founded two religious houses, Rushworth College at Rushford, Norfolk, 1342 (suppressed in 1541) and the Hospital of St John at Bishop's Lynn, Norfolk. The origin of his wealth is obscure.

His father was William Gonville, a Frenchman domiciled in England, who owned the Manor of Lerling and other property in Norfolk. William's eldest son was Sir Nicholas Gonville who married an heiress of the Lerling family.

Gonville held various positions in the English Church, serving as Rector of three parishes, Thelnetham, Suffolk (1320–26), Rushford, Norfolk (1326–1342), and Terrington St Clement, Norfolk (1343–1351). Such occupations afforded him sufficient wealth that he was able to lend money to Edward III.

Gonville worked for Edward III, apart from lending him money. In return he was rewarded with appointment as King's clerk (a title later known as Secretary of State). After Gonville, supported by Sir Walter Manny, petitioned Edward III for permission to set up a college for 20 scholars at the University of Cambridge, permission was granted and Edward III issued Letters patent in January 1348.

== Offices held ==
Religious titles
Unknown	Rector of Thelnetham, Suffolk; 1320-1326	Unknown
Unknown	Rector of Rushford, Norfolk; 1326-1342	Unknown
Unknown	Rector of Terrington St Clement, Norfolk; 1342-1351	Unknown
