= Thetford Grammar School =

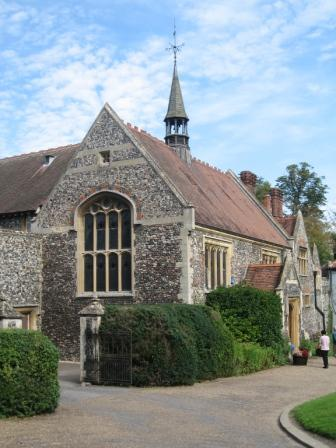
- "Old School" at Thetford Grammar School. The building where Thomas Paine studied

Location
- Bridge Street; Thetford, Norfolk, IP24 3AF; England; 52.413527°N 0.744477°E

Information
- Type: Private day school
- Motto: Loyaute me oblige (Loyalty binds me)
- Established: c.7th century (631 A.D.); 1566 (refoundation)
- Department for Education URN: 121245 Tables
- Head teacher: Amanda Faye
- Gender: Mixed
- Age: 3 to 18
- Enrolment: 241
- Houses: Cole's, Cronshey's, Millington's, Reed's.
- Former pupils: Old Thetfordians
- Website: http://www.thetgram.norfolk.sch.uk/

Thetford Grammar School was a private co-educational day school in Thetford, Norfolk, England. The school possibly dates back to the 7th century, which would make it one of the oldest schools in the United Kingdom.

== History ==
The school website conjectures its origin traces back to 631, and through its Roll of Headmasters to 1114. The Independent Schools Inspectorate assert in their 2012 report that "The school was originally founded in the 10th Century" but without any evidence provided. It appears to have ceased from around 1496 until its refoundation from the will of Sir Richard Fulmerston in 1566. The refoundation was confirmed by an Act of Parliament in 1610. Part of the school is built on the site of a thirteenth-century Dominican Friary (Blackfriars, Thetford), which may have been built on, and incorporated parts of, a Norman cathedral. This building, now known as "Old School", comprised the entire school for about 300 years, and is where the lawyer Roger North and the political activist Thomas Paine were educated.

In 1998 archaeologists from the television programme Time Team excavated at the school for three days in search of the Norman cathedral of Herbert Losinga, which was only located at Thetford for twenty years or so, before relocating to Norwich. They did not find any Norman stone building, perhaps because the short-lived cathedral was a re-used Anglo-Saxon wooden church which has not survived.

The school developed rapidly in the 1880s, and in 1888 Thetford Grammar School for Girls was built alongside the existing Grammar School. The school became a Voluntary controlled school in 1944, and remained in the state sector until 1981 when it regained its independent status. The original boys' school and the girls' grammar school merged in 1975 to form a new coeducational school.

Since 2017 the school has been owned by China Financial Services Holdings, a Hong Kong–based company.

In April 2026, it was announced that the school would shut at the end of the academic year, due to ".... the 20% VAT tariff on school fees, the removal of business rates relief, increased employer pension contributions, and the rising of the minimum wage and operating costs".

== Notable former pupils ==
- Jim Bacon, weather forecaster
- Francis Blomefield, topographer and historian
- Harold Chapman, former orthodontist
- C. H. Chapman, cartoonist
- Charles Frank, theoretical physicist
- Thomas Howard, Duke of Norfolk
- Allan Noel Minns, physician during World War I
- Roger North, musicologist, Attorney General from 1688
- Thomas Paine, American revolutionary and author
- Alfred Neobard Palmer, chemist and historian
- James Pattinson, author and writer

== See also ==
- List of the oldest schools in the United Kingdom
- List of the oldest schools in the world
