= Thetford Castle =

11th-century castle in Thetford, England

- Norfolk, England
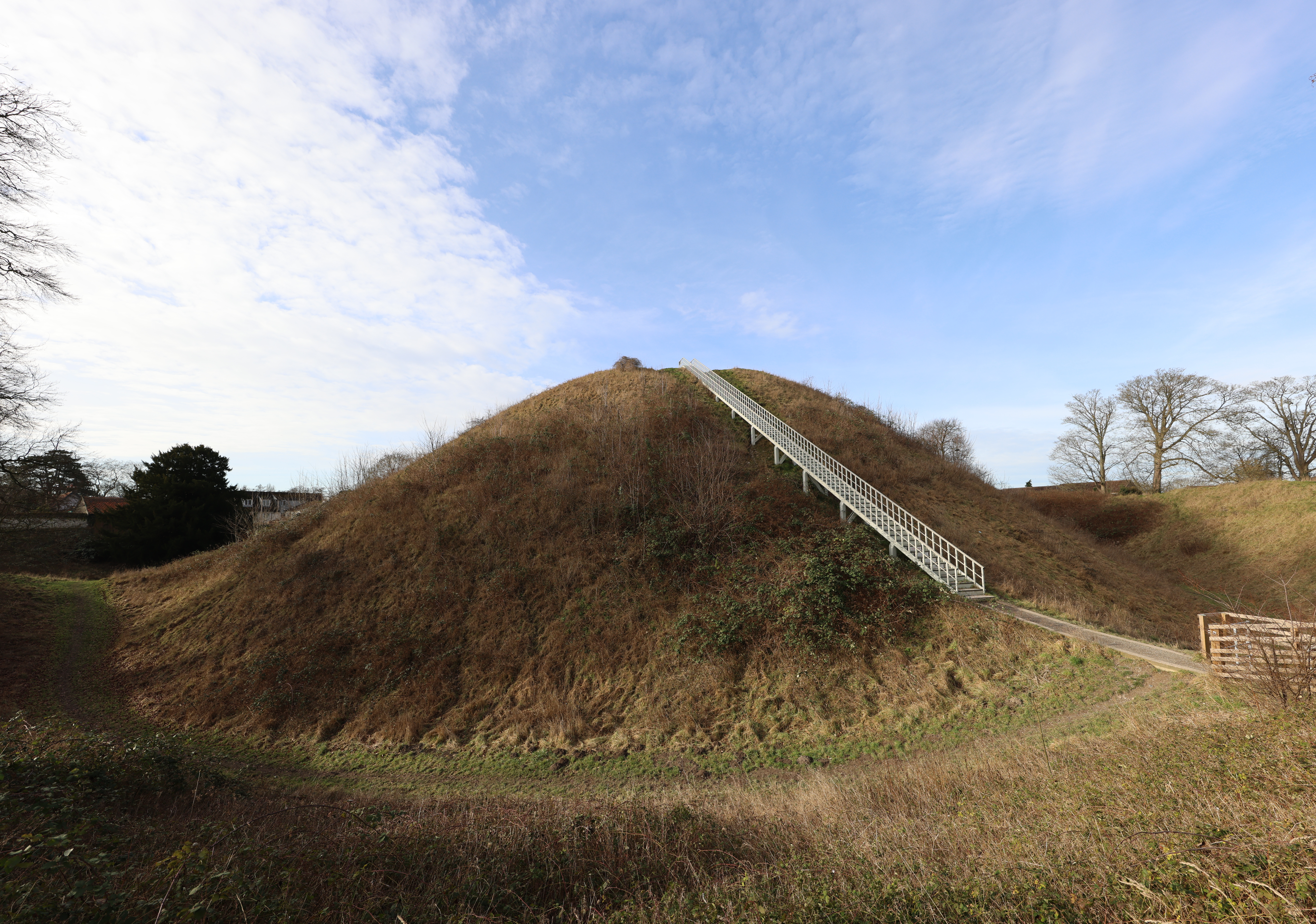
- Thetford Castle

Site information
- Type: Motte and bailey
- Owner: Local authority
- Open to the public: Yes
- Condition: Earthworks remain

Location
- Shown within Norfolk
- Coordinates: 52.4112°N 0.7547°E
- Grid reference: grid reference TL87468281

Site history
- Events: Revolt of 1173–1174

Thetford Castle is a medieval motte-and-bailey castle in the market town of Thetford in the Breckland area of Norfolk, England. The first castle in Thetford, a probable 11th-century Norman ringwork called Red Castle, was replaced in the 12th century by a much larger motte and bailey castle on the other side of the town. This new castle was largely destroyed in 1173 by Henry II, although the huge motte, the second-largest man-made mound in England, remained intact. The motte, recognised as a scheduled monument, now forms part of a local park, and the remains are known variously as Castle Hill, Castle Mound and Military Parade.

== History ==
=== 11th century ===
Thetford Castle incorporated parts of an Iron Age hillfort.

In the 11th century the largest towns in England were concentrated in the east and south-east of the country, especially in East Anglia. Thetford was an important settlement during the period and the second largest town in East Anglia. Thetford comes from "Thaetford", or "the ford", and was a key point on the ancient Icknield Way. Thetford was also an important international trading hub and a centre of pottery production. An earth and timber fort had been built on this site during the Iron Age period but had been left to decay and by the late Saxon era the town had been protected by a burgh, or ditched enclosure, that surrounded the town.

The first castle on the Thetford site was Red Castle and was probably built shortly after the Norman conquest of England by William de Warenne, the Earl of Surrey. (Note: An alternative argument, supported by archaeologists Paul Everson and Marcus Jecock, is that the castle was a mid-12th-century product of the Anarchy.) The castle was a ringwork design and was positioned across the line of the defensive Saxon ditch, in the process enclosing and cutting off the local church from the inside of the town, and building over part of the local cemetery. (Note: Earlier work had suggested that Red Castle was a motte and bailey design, with a heavily sunken centre.)

=== 12th century ===
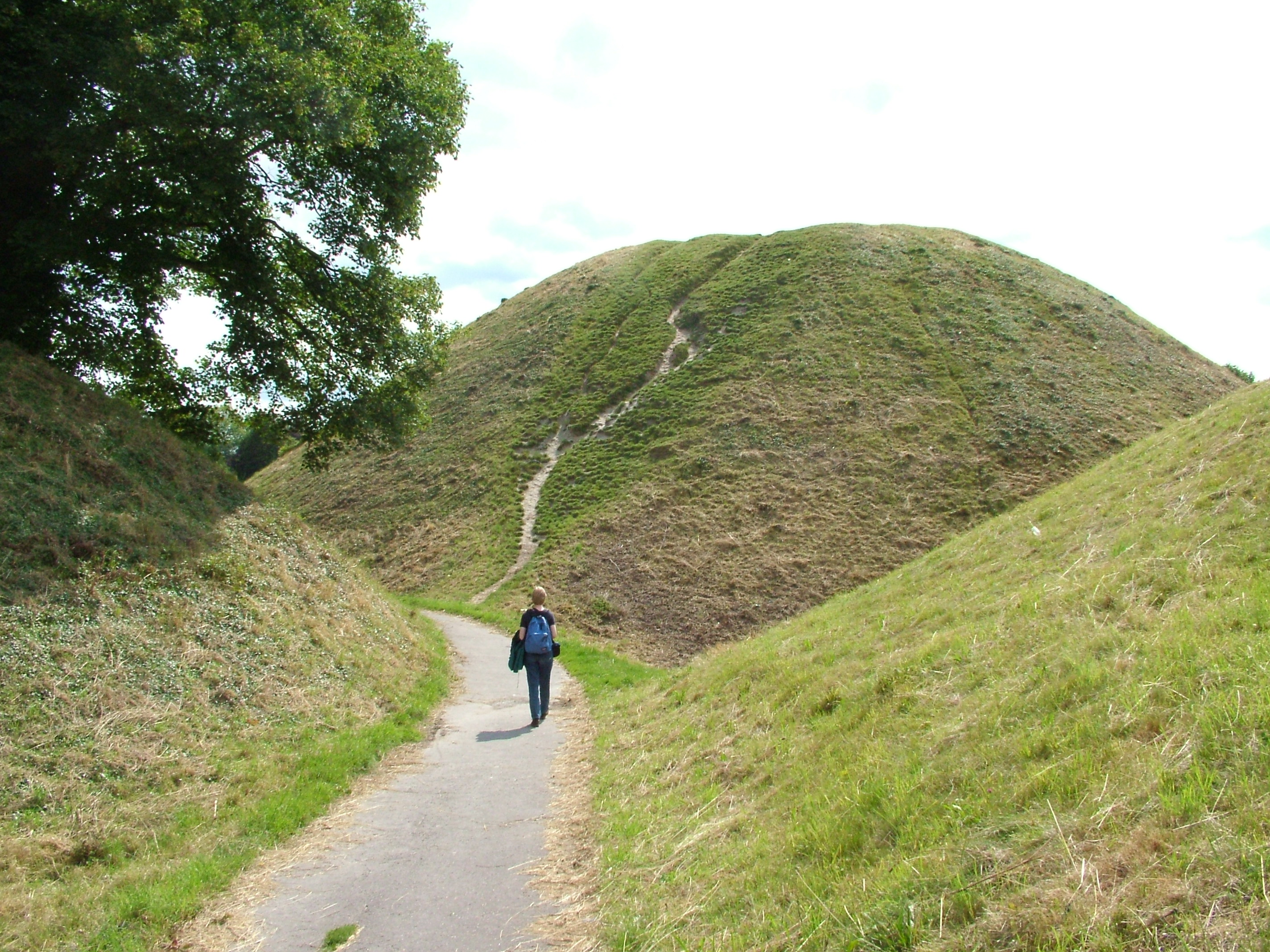
The castle motte; the earthworks in front are of medieval (l) and Iron Age (r) origin

By 1100, the town of Thetford was controlled by Roger Bigod, the Earl of Norfolk. Roger Bigod decided to build a new motte and bailey castle, positioning it so as to guard both the town and the local crossing of the Icknield Way over the River Thet and the Little Ouse. (Note: Archaeologists Paul Everson and Marcus Jecock argue that the castle may have been built by William de Warenne or William the Conqueror.)

At the heart of the castle was a huge motte, or artificial mound, sunk into a deep surrounding ditch, and protected on the north site by two sets of complex ramparts, which were probably part of the original Iron Age fortifications of the site. At 19.6 m (64 ft) high — 22 m (72 ft) from the base of the ditch — and 100 m (330 ft) wide across the base, this is the second largest man-made mound in England. (Note: The largest man-made mound in England is Silbury Hill.) The castle would have probably included a large timber keep on top of the motte, and a rectangular bailey fortification, approximately 105 by 95 m (344 by 312 ft), stretched away from the motte, exploiting the former Iron Age fortifications on one side. (Note: Earlier archaeological studies had suggested that the bailey itself was largely an Iron Age fortification, but recent studies have discounted this, arguing that only part of the bailey enclosure was of Iron Age origins, with the majority of medieval origins.) The new castle would have loomed over, and dominated, the former Saxon town.

The castle earthworks were built up from local chalk; the ditches dug around the fortification would not have provided enough for the mound itself, and local tradition suggests that much of the earth was quarried instead from the nearby Gallows Pits in the town. The castle was constructed by hand, using workers digging with wooden shovels, and probably without pickaxes. It is estimated that the motte would have taken around 24,000 man days of effort to build.

The Bigod family continued to build their grip on the region, taking advantage of their powerful castles at Thetford, Framlingham, Bungay, and Walton. Roger's son, Hugh Bigod, played a prominent role during the civil war years of the Anarchy, rebelling against King Stephen from his strongholds in East Anglia. It appears likely that a stone wall had been built around the bailey around this time, and recent work has speculated that a stone keep was also erected on the site. At the end of the war, however, Henry II took the throne and attempted to restore royal power across the region. In 1157, Henry seized Bigod's castles; he ultimately returned Framlingham and Bungay, but retained Thetford Castle for his own use. Hugh Bigod then joined the revolt by Henry's sons, seizing the castle, but in 1173 Henry's forces captured the castle and destroyed (slighted) the fortifications. The mound, however, proved effectively indestructible. Thetford was one of at least twenty castles belonging to the rebels that were slighted in the aftermath of the conflict.

=== 13th–20th centuries ===
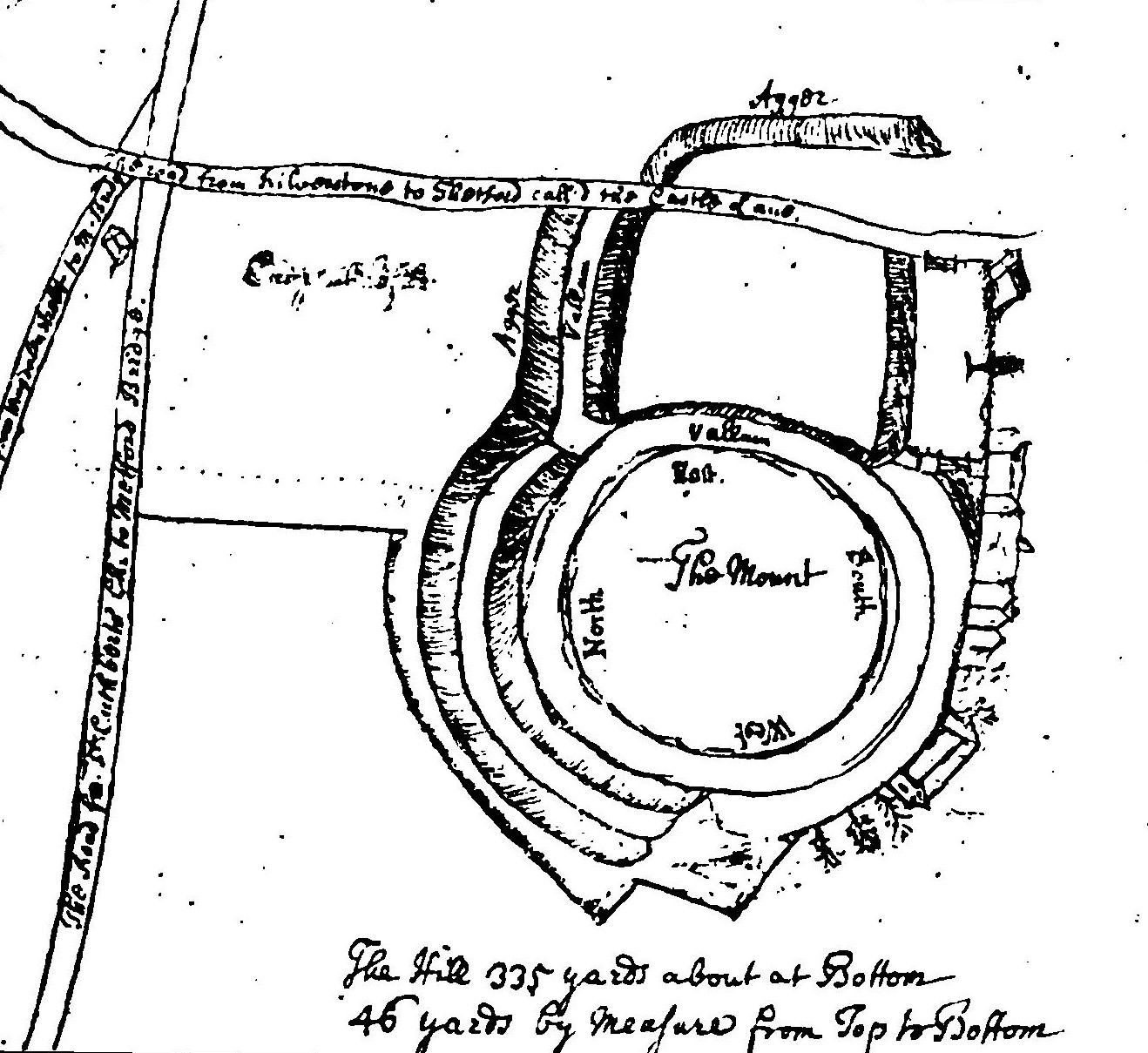
1740 plan of Thetford Castle, including the east bank destroyed in 1772

Thetford declined after the 12th century, and the castle rapidly became disused, although as late as 1558, the Castle Yard was in use and still said to have been surrounded with a stone wall. In 1772 the east bank of the outer bailey was destroyed. In 1823 a group of elm trees were planted near the top of the mound.

Interest continued in the origins of the castle, which for a period were forgotten. Local medieval tradition suggested that the mound had been made by the devil, after he completed the dykes at Narborough and Newmarket, but by the Victorian period academics had concluded that the mound was either of Celtic or Norman origin, with late Victorian scholars correctly concluding that the Norman period was the most likely. Other traditions claimed that the mound covered a palace filled with treasure, or six silver bells from Thetford Priory. Archaeological investigations into Red Castle by G. Knocker between 1957–58, and during the early 1960s by R. R. Clarke and Barbara Green revealed the design and date of this castle site.

=== 21st century ===
Today the motte is owned by the local authority and forms part of the Castle Park; the castle bailey is now known as Military Parade. The site is a scheduled monument.

== See also ==
- Castles in Great Britain and Ireland
- List of castles in England

== Bibliography ==
- Ash, Russell. (1973) Folklore, Myths and Legends of Britain. Reader's Digest Association Limited. ISBN 9780340165973.
- Brown, R. Allen. (1959) "A List of Castles, 1154–1216", The English Historical Review 74 (291), pp. 249–280 doi:10.1093/EHR/LXXIV.291.249
- Brown, R. Allen. (1962) English Castles. London: Batsford. OCLC 1392314.
- Brown, R. Allen. (1989) Castles From the Air. Cambridge: Cambridge University Press. ISBN 978-0-521-32932-3.
- Clarke, W. G. (1906) "Thetford Castle Hill," Norfolk Archaeology, 16 (1), pp. 39–45. doi:10.5284/1077574
- Creighton, Oliver Hamilton. (2005) Castles and Landscapes: Power, Community and Fortification in Medieval England. London: Equinox. ISBN 978-1-904768-67-8.
- Davison, Brian K. (1967) "The Late Saxon Town of Thetford: An Interim Report on the 1964-5 Excavations," Medieval Archaeology 11, pp189–195. doi:10.1080/00766097.1967.11735295
- Dyer, Christopher. (2009) Making a Living in the Middle Ages: The People of Britain, 850 – 1520. London: Yale University Press. ISBN 978-0-300-10191-1.
- Everson, Paul and Marcus Jecock. (1999) "Castle Hill and the Early Medieval Development of Thetford in Norfolk," in Pattison, Field and Ainsworth (eds).
- King, D. J. Cathcart. (1991) The Castle in England and Wales: An Interpretative History. London: Routledge. ISBN 0-415-00350-4.
- Knocker, G. M. (1967) "Excavations at Red Castle, Thetford," Norfolk Archaeology 34 (2), pp. 119–86. doi:10.5284/1077988
- Pattison, Paul, David Field and Steward Ainsworth (eds) (1999) Patterns of the Past: Essays in Landscape Archaeology for Christopher Taylor. Oxford: Oxbow Books. ISBN 1-900188-83-X.
- Pettifer, Adrian. (2002) English Castles: a Guide by Counties. Woodbridge, UK: Boydell Press. ISBN 978-0-85115-782-5.
- Pounds, Norman John Greville. (1994) The Medieval Castle in England and Wales: a Social and Political History. Cambridge: Cambridge University Press. ISBN 978-0-521-45828-3.
- Wilson, David M. and Hurst, D. Gillian. (1964) "Medieval Britain in 1962 and 1963," Medieval Archaeology 8, pp. 231–299. doi:10.1080/00766097.1964.11735681
