= Thetford =

Town in Norfolk, England

Coordinates: 52.41°N 0.74°E

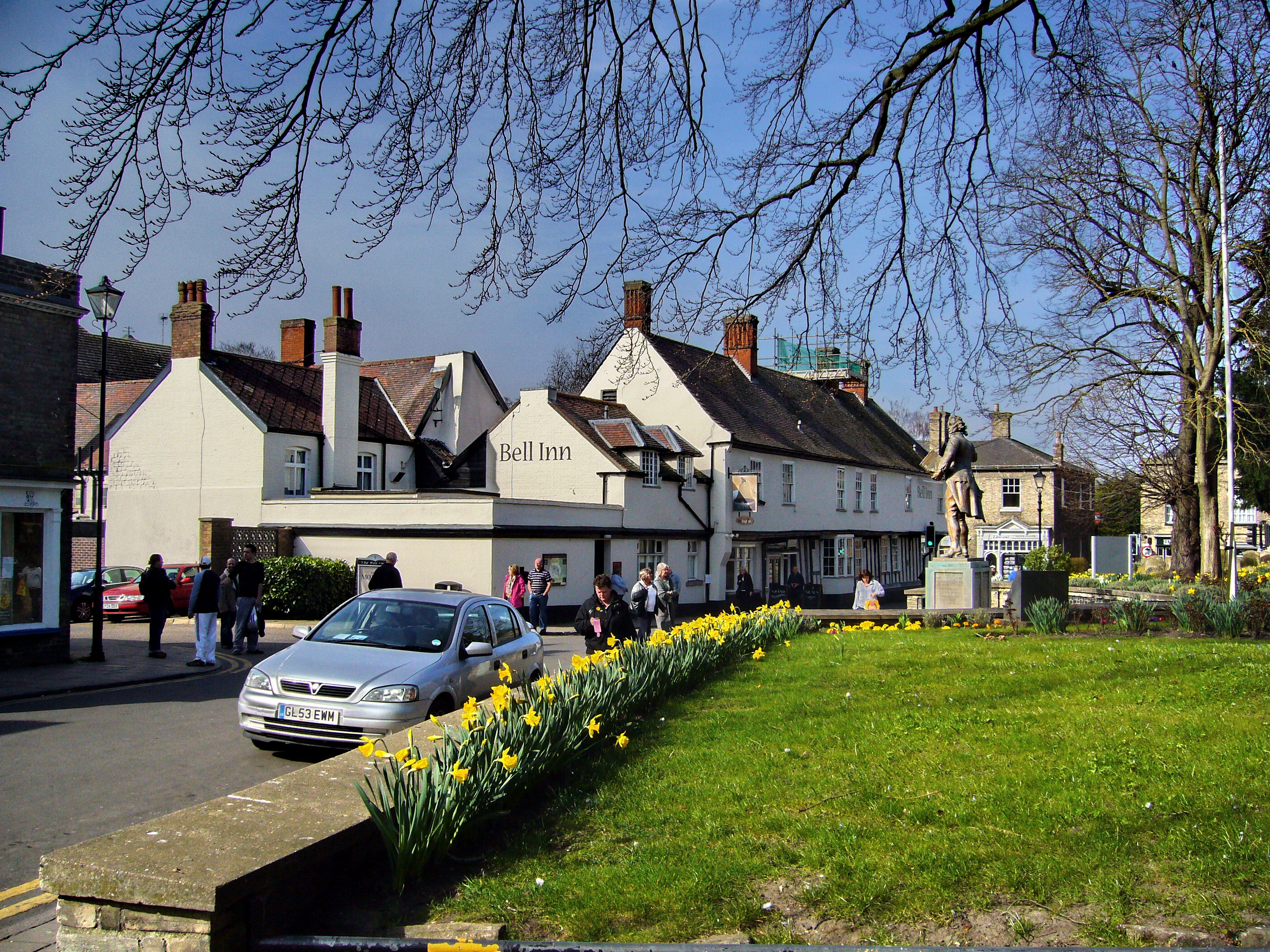
- King Street, Thetford

- Location within Norfolk
- Area: 29.55 km^{2} (11.41 sq mi)
- Population: 25,241 (2021 Census)
  - Density: 854/km^{2} (2,210/sq mi)
- OS grid reference: TL8783
- Civil parish: Thetford
- District: Breckland
- Shire county: Norfolk
- Region: East
- Country: England
- Sovereign state: United Kingdom
- Post town: THETFORD
- Postcode district: IP24
- Dialling code: 01842
- Police: Norfolk
- Fire: Norfolk
- Ambulance: East of England
- UK Parliament: South West Norfolk
- Website: thetfordtowncouncil.gov.uk

Thetford is a market town and civil parish in the Breckland District of Norfolk, England. It is on the A11 road between Norwich and London, just east of Thetford Forest. The civil parish, covering an area of 29.55 km^{2} (11.41 sq mi), in 2011 had a population of 24,340.

There has been a settlement at Thetford since the Iron Age, and parts of the town predate the Norman Conquest; Thetford Castle was established shortly thereafter. Roger Bigod founded the Cluniac Priory of St Mary in 1104, which became the largest and most important religious institution in Thetford. The town was badly hit by the Dissolution of the Monasteries, including the castle's destruction, but was rebuilt in 1574 when Elizabeth I established a town charter. After World War II, Thetford became an "overspill town", taking people from London, as a result of which its population increased substantially.

Thetford railway station is located on the Breckland line and is one of the best surviving pieces of 19th-century railway architecture in East Anglia.

== Name ==
The origin of the name Thetford is unclear. The site was an important crossing of the River Little Ouse, so one possibility is that the settlement drew its name from the Anglo-Saxon Theodford or people's ford. It is also unclear if the nearby River Thet is named after the crossing or the later settlement.

== History ==
=== Early history ===
Breckland was used as an excavation site for flint tools around 2000 BC. During the Iron Age, a fort was established on Icknield Way at the site of Thetford Castle. Thetford was an important tribal centre for the Iceni during the late Iron Age and early Roman period, with Castle Hill and Gallows Hill being sites of particular note. During the Saxon period it was the principal centre of the eastern Heptarchy and a regular battle site between locals and the Viking invaders.

A mint was built in Thetford in the 9th century. There is evidence of coins minted in Thetford from the time of King Canute to the reign of King John. A monastery was established around 1020 and a grammar school was operating since before the Norman Conquest of 1066. The town greatly prospered during the reign of Edward the Confessor (1042–1066), and at one point there were 944 free Burgesses living in Thetford. The Domesday Book of 1086 estimated the population of Thetford to have grown to between 4000 and 4500 people, which would have been the sixth largest town in Britain at the time. The Book lists William of Bello Fargo as the Bishop of Thetford then. The bishopric had moved here from North Elmham in 1071 and stayed in Thetford until moving to Norwich in 1096.

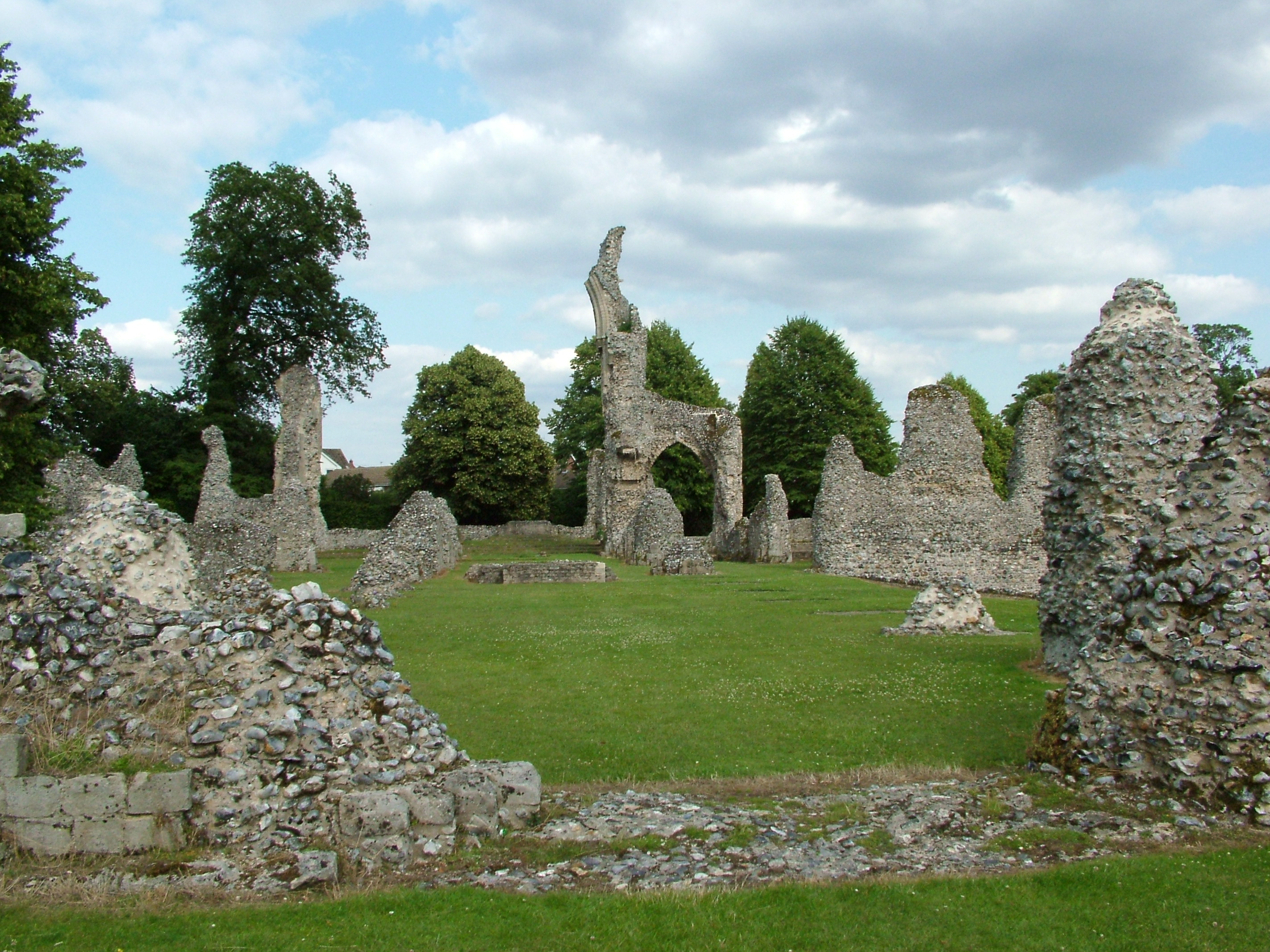
Ruins of the Priory of St Mary

In 1067–1069, Thetford Castle was built on the ruins of an Iron Age fort at Castle Hill. It is believed to have been constructed either by Ralph Guader, Earl of East Anglia, or Roger Bigod, his successor as Earl, who is known to have ordered Bungay and Framlingham castles to have been built in Suffolk. In 1104, Bigod founded the Cluniac Priory of St Mary. The priory grew rapidly, with an influx of monks from Lewes, and in 1107 it was moved to a larger site on the other side of the river where the ruins remain today. It became the largest and most important religious institution in Thetford.

The Norfolk Lent Assizes were held at Thetford from 1264 because there was only one Assize for both Norfolk and Suffolk. Thetford, being close to the border between the two, was convenient for both. However, after much pressure, an Act of Parliament was passed in 1832 to transfer them to Norwich. In 1373, John of Gaunt, the Duke of Lancaster, was responsible for altering the administrative makeup of the town, promoting the mayor to its most important official, subjecting the bailiff and the coroner to report to him. Thetford had its own coroner, courts and legal officials, without depending on those for the counties of Norfolk and Suffolk.

=== Tudor history to present ===
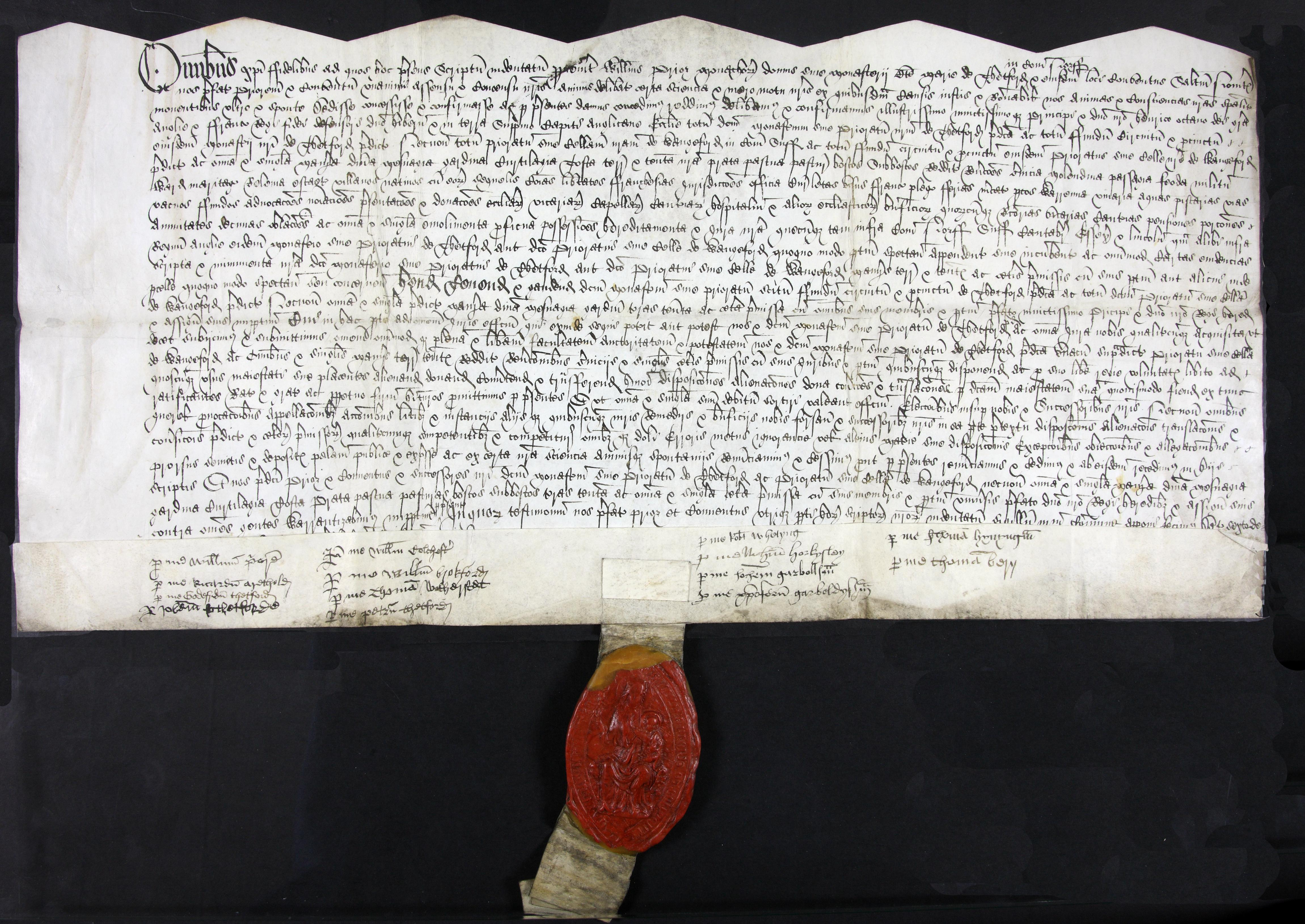
Deed of Surrender of Thetford Priory, 1540

Henry VIII sent Anne Boleyn's father, Thomas, as part of a Commission to assess Thetford in 1527. The Commission concluded that the town had fallen into "great ruin and decay" and that the burgesses of the town had squandered rents and dues which belonged to the King. Thetford was struck hard by the Dissolution of the Monasteries in the 1530s and 1540s. A formal complaint was raised by the mayors and burgesses to Thomas Cromwell in 1539, arguing that many of the town's inhabitants would fall into extreme poverty because their livelihoods depended on pilgrims visiting Thetford. Thetford Priory was closed down in 1540 and fell into the possession of Thomas Howard, 3rd Duke of Norfolk. In 1574, Elizabeth I granted a Charter of Incorporation to the town, setting up a governing body of a mayor, ten burgesses and twenty commoners to meet in the Guildhall and redevelop the town's main streets, houses and shops. Elizabeth arrived in Thetford on 27 August 1578 to survey developments, holding a Privy Council meeting at Sir Edward Clere's Place House, now Nunnery Place. A lot of material from the decaying priory and religious buildings in the town were used to save building costs in the building of King's House and other buildings in Thetford.

James VI and I visited Thetford, and in 1609 bought a house near St Peter's churchyard from Sir William Barwick, still known as the King's House. The house was rebuilt and extended for the king with a "treble roof" of three gables. Charles I granted the house to his Master Falconer, Andrew Pitcairns.

In 1819 there was a local desire to develop Thetford into a spa town modelled on Bath, Cheltenham and Harrogate. A pump room was built over the spring at Nuns Bridges and the Thetford Mineral Spring Company was established. The mayor financed a new gravel path along the bank of the Little Ouse, which was named Spring Walk. The plan did not succeed; by 1838 the pump room was closed. In 1835 the old Corporation of Thetford was abolished, and a new one set up a mayor, four aldermen and twelve councillors. The town was represented by two MPs until 1868 when it lost a seat to Scotland.

Dr Allan Glaisyer Minns, born in Inagua, the Bahamas, became the first black man to become a mayor in Britain when he was elected as Mayor of Thetford in 1904.

In 1912, more than 30,000 troops participated in military manoeuvres on the heath land outside the town. Over 700 men from the town fought in World War I; a memorial was erected in 1921 with the names of over 100 men who died during the war. Locally in the wooded and sandy-soiled areas the trial tests of the first tank took place in total secrecy in early 1915. At the end of World War II, Thetford still only had a population of around 5000 people. In the 1950s, the borough council drew up a plan with the London County Council to relocate Londoners and several businesses to Thetford and double the population. By the late 1980s the population of Thetford had reached around 21,000 people. This meant that Thetford grew faster than any other town in Norfolk.

=== July 2026 riots ===
In July 2026 there were several nights of mob violence including attacks on police officers and on homes thought to be occupied by asylum seekers. 19 arrests had been made by 14 August 2026. On 18 August a man was charged with misconduct in a public office " in connection with the release of information relating to a number of addresses in Thetford, which were later targeted during several nights of violent disorder in the town."

== Geography ==
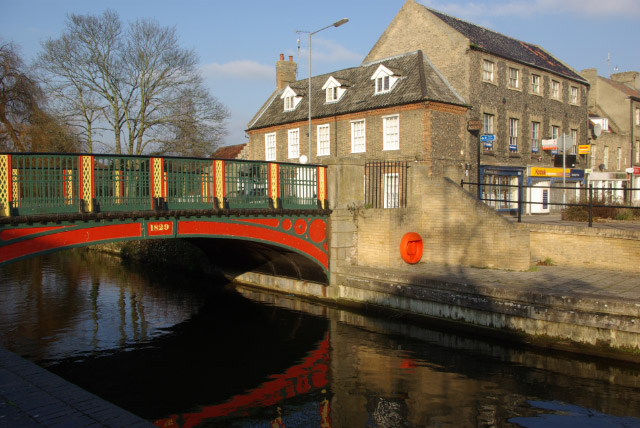
Bridge over the Little Ouse in Thetford

Thetford is situated in the south of Norfolk, close to the county boundary with Suffolk. By road it is 33.8 miles (54.4 km) northeast of Cambridge and 30.7 miles (49.4 km) southwest of Norwich. It lies on the River Little Ouse. On the western side of Thetford is Thetford Forest, which is heavily forested with pine trees. Brettenham Heath National Nature Reserve is to the northeast, near the hamlet of Roudham. To the southeast of Thetford is Nunnery Lakes Nature Reserve, covering about 200 acres (80 hectares), with breckland heath, woodland, fen and open water habitats and two kilometres (1 1/4 mi) of paths.

== Economy and services ==
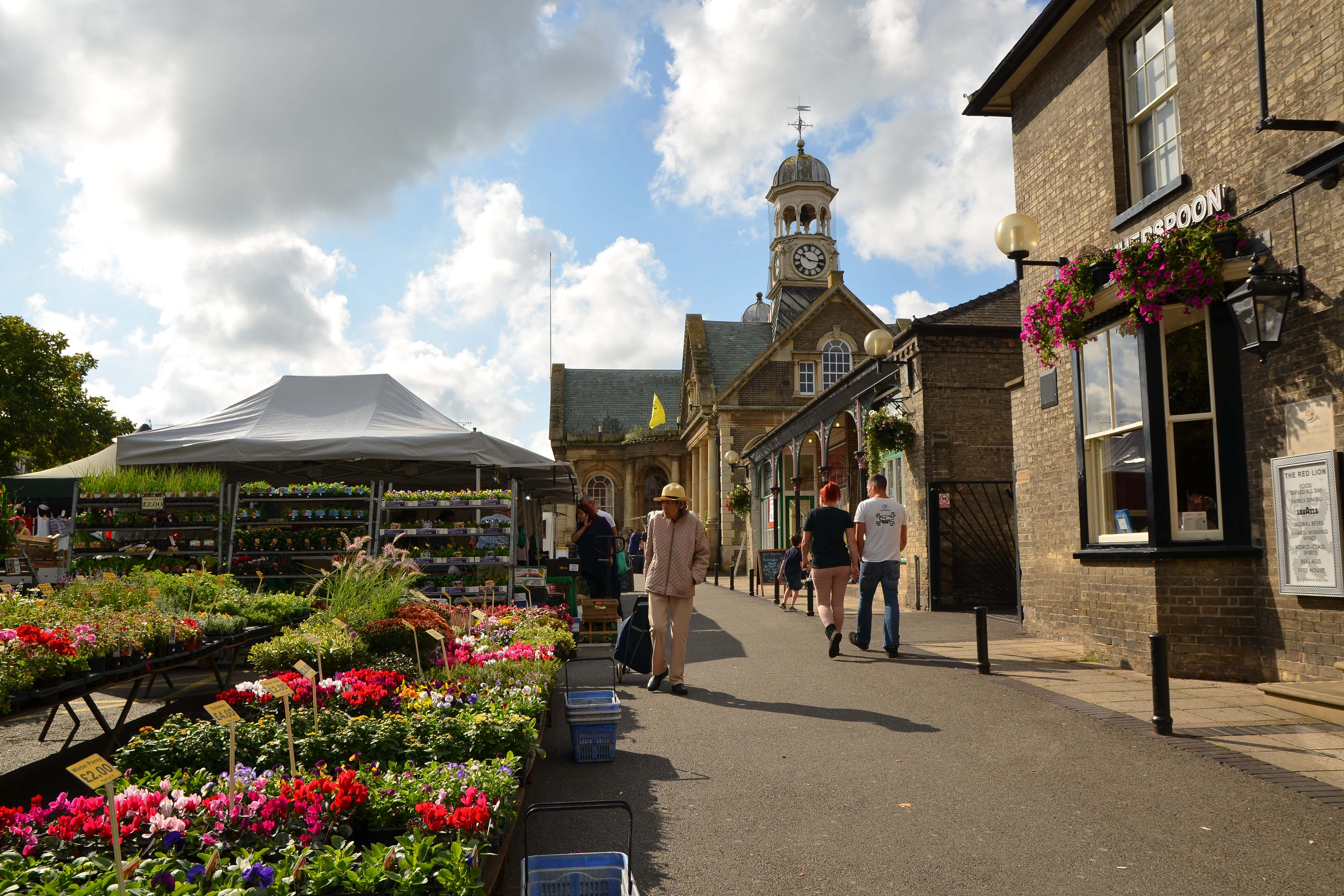
The market with Thetford Guildhall in the background

The Thetford Borough Police Force was established in 1836, and in 1857 the small force joined Norfolk County Constabulary. Thetford Fire Brigade was established in 1880.

The Thetford Gas Company, founded in 1838, proved very short-lived until Thetford Gasworks opened on Bury Road in 1845. In 1848, gas street lighting was installed in Thetford. From 1877 the town was provided with a clean water supply thanks to a new reservoir and steam engine on Gallows Hill to pump fresh water into the town. In 1929 the Anglian Electricity Supply Company began supplying electricity to the town, which was completed in 1933.

Thetford was the headquarters of Tulip International, large-scale manufacturers of bacon, beef and pork. In March 2007 the factory laid off three quarters of their workforce in Thetford with the loss of 350 jobs, and the factory later closed in 2010. In January 2018 it was announced that a new retail park and restaurant had been approved on the factory site with over 7,367 square metres (79,300 sq ft) of retail floor space. The development was initiated by Stapleford Thetford Ltd. as part of the Thetford-Cambridge-Norwich Technology Corridor. The market is held outside Thetford Guildhall in the town centre on Tuesdays and Saturdays.

The British Trust for Ornithology has its headquarters at The Nunnery in Thetford.

== Landmarks ==
Thetford contains the ruins of Thetford Castle and Thetford Priory, which was closed during the Reformation. The Grade II listed timber-framed Bell Inn in the town was first mentioned in 1493 and was used as a coaching inn on the Norwich-London road until 1845 when the town became connected by railway. The Black Horse public house dates from the mid 18th century, and is grade II listed. Thetford Warren Lodge was built in around 1400 by the Prior of Thetford to protect gamekeepers and hunters against poachers, and was later used to harvest rabbits.

The Charles Burrell Museum opened in 1991 in the former Paint Shop of Charles Burrell & Sons on Minstergate in Thetford. The museum is dedicated to steam power and steam transport. The Ancient House Museum is situated in an oak-framed Tudor merchant's house on White Hart Street. It contains replicas of the Thetford Hoard and has numerous displays about flinting, rabbit warrens and wildlife. The Thetford Academy was established through the merger of Charles Burrell Humanities School and Rosemary Musker High School in September 2010.

== Culture ==
The external scenes for the BBC TV series Dad's Army were filmed in and around the town, with Thetford's flint buildings doubling for Walmington-on-Sea. The Dad's Army Museum is housed in part of Thetford Guildhall.

=== Media ===
Local news and television programmes are provided by BBC East and ITV Anglia. Television signals are received from the Tacolneston and local relay transmitters.

The town's local radio stations are BBC Radio Norfolk on 104.4 FM, Greatest Hits Radio Norfolk & North Suffolk on 96.7 FM, Heart East on 102.4 FM, and Thetford Radio, a community radio station.

The local newspapers are the Thetford & Brandon Times and the Eastern Daily Press.

== Sport ==
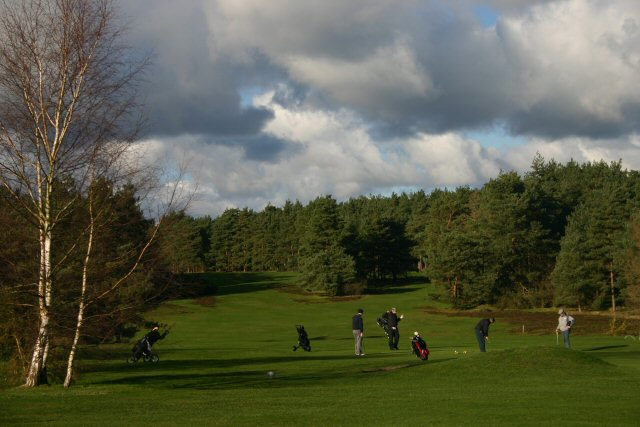
Thetford Golf Club

The local football club, Thetford Town, plays in the Eastern Counties Football League. Thetford Rugby Union Football Club is based on Mundford Road just outside Thetford, with its first team playing in the Eastern Counties London 3.

Thetford Town Cricket Club have two adult teams competing in the Norfolk Cricket Alliance and one in the Norfolk Friendly Alliance. The club also has a junior section.

A swimming team called the Thetford Dolphins is based at Breckland Leisure Centre's Waterworld swimming pools. World champion triathlete Chrissie Wellington is a former member of this swimming club.

Thetford Golf Club, to the northwest of the town in Thetford Forest Park, was established in 1912 with a course originally designed by Charles H. Mayo, and later alterations by James Braid and Philip Mackenzie Ross. The construction of the second Thetford bypass resulted in five of the course holes being lost and having to be re-fashioned by Cameron Sinclair and Donald Steel.

== Transport ==
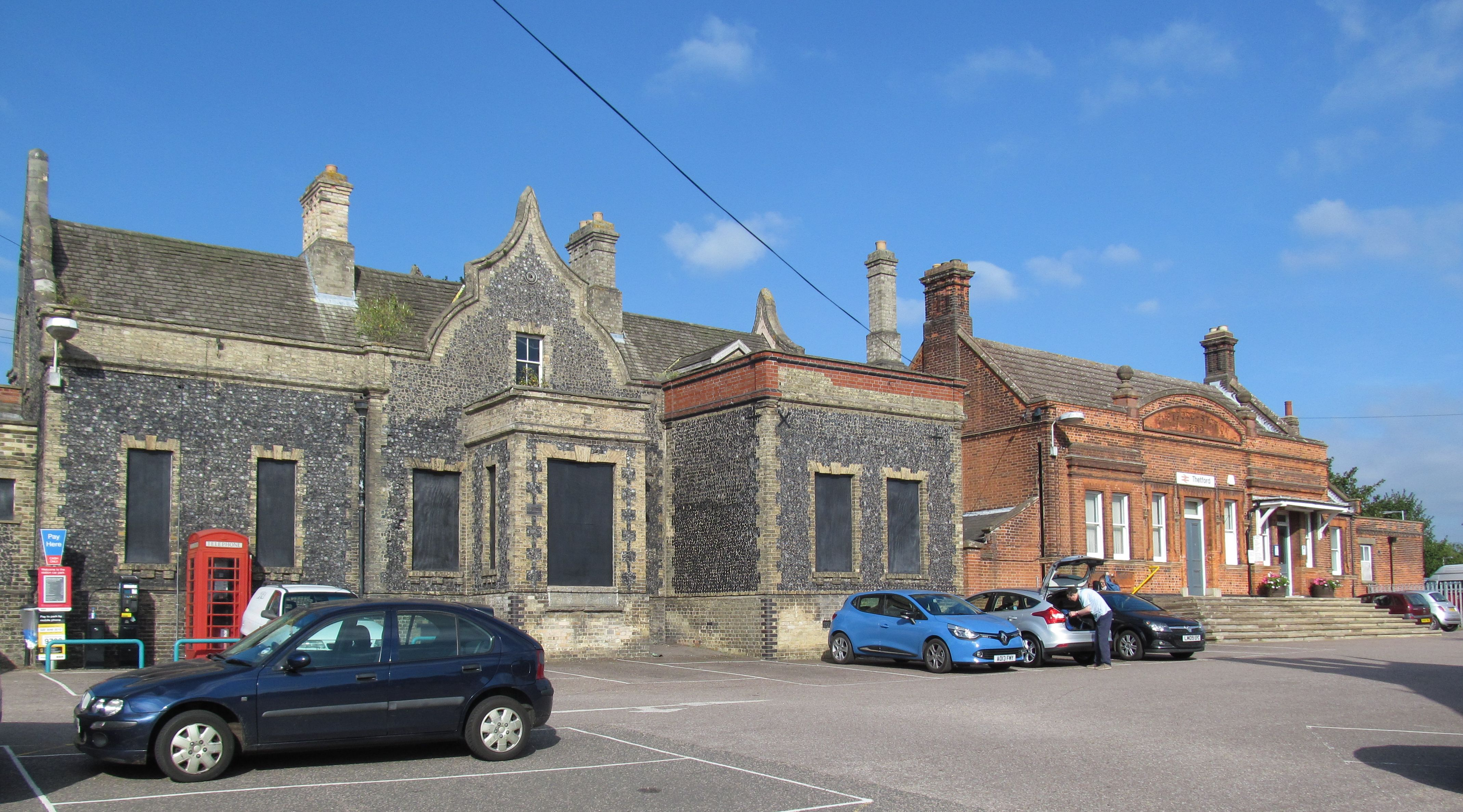
Thetford station buildings

Thetford railway station is a stop on the Breckland line between Ely and Norwich. Greater Anglia operates services between Norwich and Stansted Airport, via Cambridge; East Midlands Railway runs a route between Norwich and Liverpool Lime Street, via Sheffield and Manchester Piccadilly.

The station was opened in 1845. The station building was designed in a Neo-Jacobean style and constructed using local Breckland flint; it was extended in 1889. It has one of the best preserved set of railway buildings in East Anglia, retaining nine separate buildings that have survived from the nineteenth century, and has been Grade II listed since 1971. The Thetford to Bury St Edmunds line opened on 1 March 1876 and included a second station in the town, Thetford Bridge. The line closed to passengers in 1953 and goods in 1960.

Coach Services are the primary bus operator in Thetford, with services to Bury St Edmunds, King's Lynn, Brandon, Mildenhall and Norwich.

The town sits on the historic turnpike road between London and Norwich, which later became the A11. The first bypass opened in 1968, followed by a second in 1987. A high speed dual carriageway link from Thetford towards London opened in December 2014, which removed the remaining 9 miles (14 km) of single carriageway via Elveden. The other main roads through the town are the A134 from Colchester to King's Lynn, and the A1066 towards Diss.

The National Cycle Route 13 links Thetford to Gateley, near Fakenham.

== Notable people ==
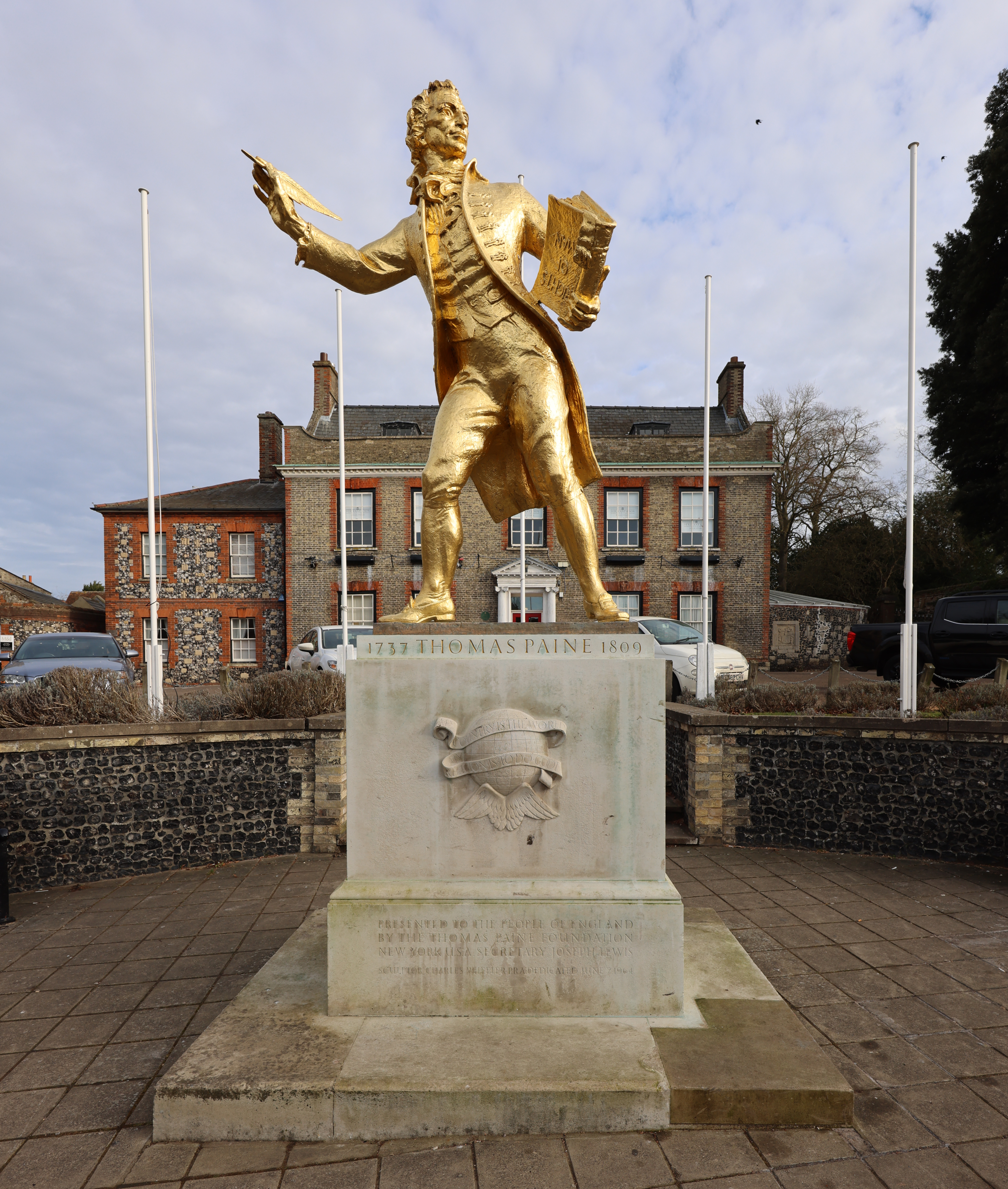
Statue of Thomas Paine, Thetford

- Theodosia Ann Dean (1819–1843), missionary; was born in the town
- Terry Jermy (born 1985), Labour politician; was born in the town of which he became Mayor in 2016, and which he represents as MP for South West Norfolk.
- Allan Glaisyer Minns (1858–1930), Doctor and the first black man to become a mayor in Britain, was mayor of Thetford
- Allan Noel Minns (1891–1921), latter's son, Doctor and one of first British Army officers of Afro-Caribbean descent to serve in World War I; buried in Thetford Cemetery.
- Thomas Paine (1737–1809), political radical, involved in both the American Revolution and the French Revolution, was born in the town.
- Duleep Singh (1838–1893), last Maharaja of the Punjab, lived part of his exile at nearby Elveden. An equestrian statue of the Maharaja was unveiled in 1999 at Butten Island in the town, which benefited from his and his sons' generosity.

== Twin towns ==
Thetford is twinned with the towns of:

- Hürth, near Cologne, Germany
- Skawina, near Kraków, Poland
- Nissewaard, near Rotterdam, Netherlands
- Les Ulis, near Paris, France

== Freedom of the Town ==
The following people and military units have received the Freedom of the Town of Thetford.

=== Individuals ===
- William Ellis Clarke: 1973.
- David Osborne: 14 September 2019. Town Historian

=== Military units ===
- RAF Honington on 9 June 2019.

== Climate ==
Climate data for Santon Downham, (Note: Weather station is located 5.0 miles (8.0 km) from the Thetford town centre.) (1991–2020 normals, extremes 1988–present)
Month	Jan	Feb	Mar	Apr	May	Jun	Jul	Aug	Sep	Oct	Nov	Dec	Year
Record high °C (°F)	16.7 (62.1)	19.4 (66.9)	22.6 (72.7)	28.2 (82.8)	28.8 (83.8)	33.0 (91.4)	33.3 (91.9)	35.3 (95.5)	31.7 (89.1)	29.3 (84.7)	18.8 (65.8)	16.0 (60.8)	35.3 (95.5)
Mean daily maximum °C (°F)	7.8 (46.0)	8.5 (47.3)	11.2 (52.2)	14.4 (57.9)	17.7 (63.9)	20.4 (68.7)	22.9 (73.2)	22.6 (72.7)	19.5 (67.1)	15.2 (59.4)	10.9 (51.6)	8.0 (46.4)	14.9 (58.9)
Daily mean °C (°F)	4.3 (39.7)	4.6 (40.3)	6.5 (43.7)	8.8 (47.8)	11.9 (53.4)	14.8 (58.6)	17.1 (62.8)	16.9 (62.4)	14.1 (57.4)	10.7 (51.3)	7.0 (44.6)	4.5 (40.1)	10.1 (50.2)
Mean daily minimum °C (°F)	0.8 (33.4)	0.7 (33.3)	1.7 (35.1)	3.2 (37.8)	6.1 (43.0)	9.2 (48.6)	11.3 (52.3)	11.1 (52.0)	8.7 (47.7)	6.1 (43.0)	3.0 (37.4)	1.0 (33.8)	5.3 (41.5)
Record low °C (°F)	−14.5 (5.9)	−14.6 (5.7)	−10.0 (14.0)	−9.7 (14.5)	−5.4 (22.3)	−1.7 (28.9)	1.6 (34.9)	0.6 (33.1)	−3.3 (26.1)	−8.7 (16.3)	−8.4 (16.9)	−13.6 (7.5)	−14.6 (5.7)
Average precipitation mm (inches)	54.4 (2.14)	44.3 (1.74)	45.5 (1.79)	40.7 (1.60)	46.9 (1.85)	60.1 (2.37)	58.8 (2.31)	65.2 (2.57)	55.1 (2.17)	67.3 (2.65)	65.9 (2.59)	62.1 (2.44)	666.3 (26.23)
Average precipitation days (≥ 1.0 mm)	11.2	10.4	9.5	8.9	8.5	9.5	9.5	9.6	9.0	10.7	11.9	11.8	120.5
Mean monthly sunshine hours	50.1	75.9	108.0	162.3	198.0	186.2	198.9	190.9	135.4	103.6	63.5	53.9	1,526.7
Source 1: Met Office (precipitation days 1981–2010)
Source 2: Starlings Roost Weather
