= Richard William Pfaff =

American historian (1936–2016)

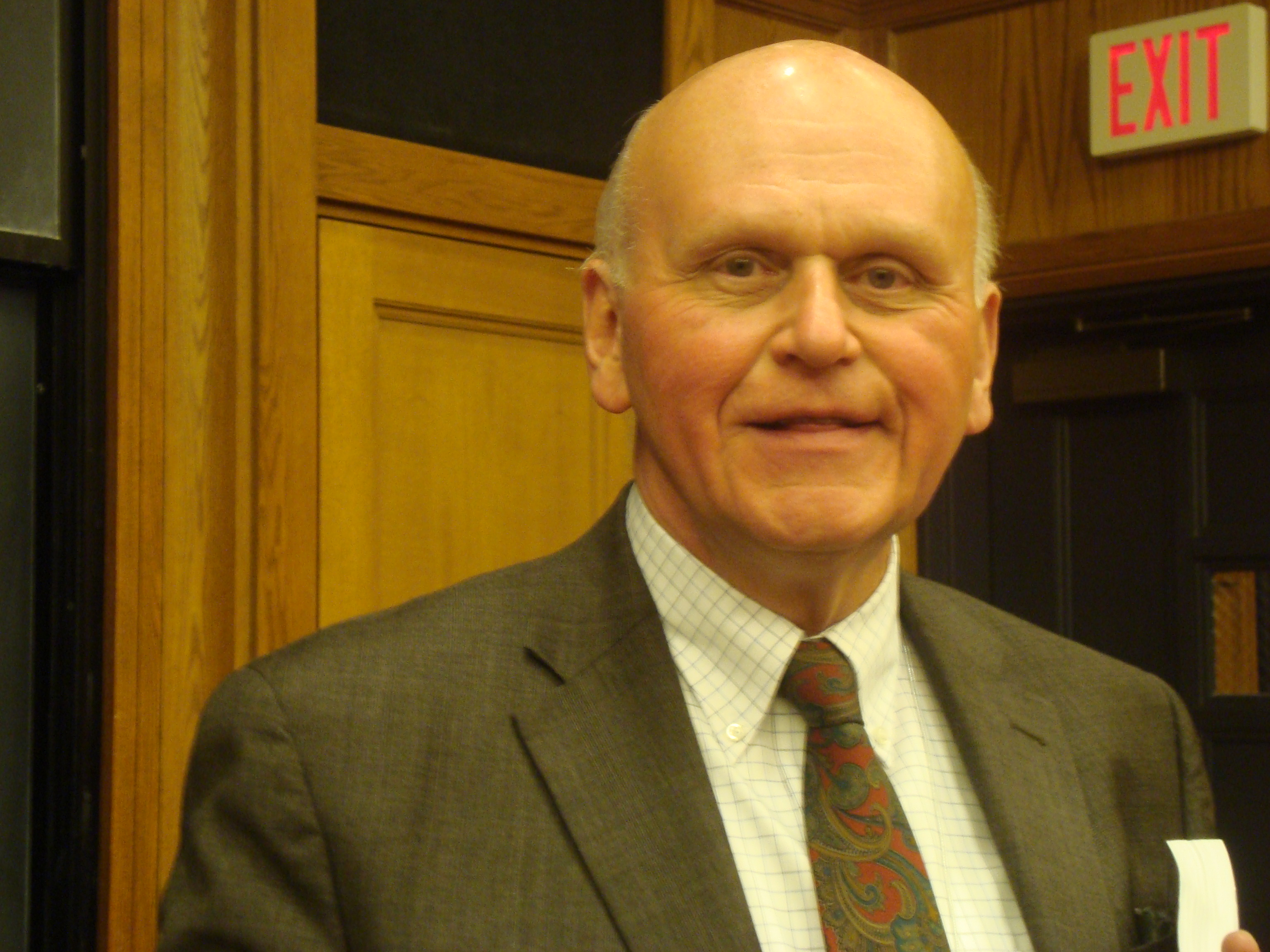

Richard William Pfaff (August 6, 1936–10 July 2016) was an American historian specializing in medieval English liturgy.

== Biography ==
He was a descendant of German settlers in the Midwest. In 1966, he was ordained a priest in the Episcopal Church. He completed his B.A. in history at Harvard College. He later received the Rhodes scholarship and attended Magdalen College, Oxford, where he received his D.Phil in history. He served as a professor of history at the University of North Carolina Chapel Hill until his retirement in 2006.

In 1993, he became a Fellow of the Society of Antiquaries of London.

== Personal life ==
He was married to Margaret Campbell until her death in 2010; they had one son. He married Jeanette Falk shortly before his death.

== Bibliography ==
His notable books include:

- The Liturgy in Medieval England: A History. Cambridge: Cambridge University Press 2009.
- Liturgical Calendars, Saints and Services in Medieval England. (= Variorum collected studies series 610). Aldershot: Ashgate 1998.
- Medieval Latin Liturgy: A Select Bibliography (= Toronto Medieval Bibliographies 9). Toronto: University of Toronto Press 1982.
- New Liturgical Feasts In Later Medieval England (= Oxford theological monographs). Oxford: Clarendon Press 1970.
- Gibson, Margaret T.; Pfaff, Richard William; Heslop, T. A., eds. (1992). The Eadwine psalter: text, image, and monastic culture in twelfth-century Canterbury. London: Modern Humanities Research Association. ISBN 9780947623463.
