= Margaret Gibson (historian) =

British historian and academic (1938–1994)

Margaret Templeton Gibson (25 January 1938 – 2 August 1994) was a British historian and academic, who specialised in early medieval history, biblical exegesis, and medieval philosophy. Having studied at the University of St Andrews and the University of Oxford, she then spent her entire teaching career at the University of Liverpool (1966–1991): at the height of her career, she was Reader in Medieval History and Director of the Liverpool Centre for Medieval Studies. In retirement and through illness, she was a senior research fellow at St Peter's College, Oxford until her death in 1994 from cancer.

== Selected works ==
- Gibson, Margaret (1978). Lanfranc of Bec. Oxford: Clarendon Press.
- Gibson, Margaret (1981). Boethius: His Life, Thought and Influence. Oxford: Wiley–Blackwell.
- Gibson, Margaret T. (1993). 'Artes' and Bible in the medieval West. Aldershot: Variorum.
- Gibson, Margaret T.; Pfaff, Richard William; Heslop, T. A., eds. (1992). The Eadwine psalter: text, image, and monastic culture in twelfth-century Canterbury. London: Modern Humanities Research Association. ISBN 9780947623463.
- Gibson, Margaret T. (1994). The Liverpool ivories: late antique and medieval ivory and bone carving in Liverpool Museum and the Walker Art Gallery. London: HMSO. ISBN 9780112905332.
