= Cloisters Cross =

Complex 12th-century ivory Romanesque altar cross or processional cross

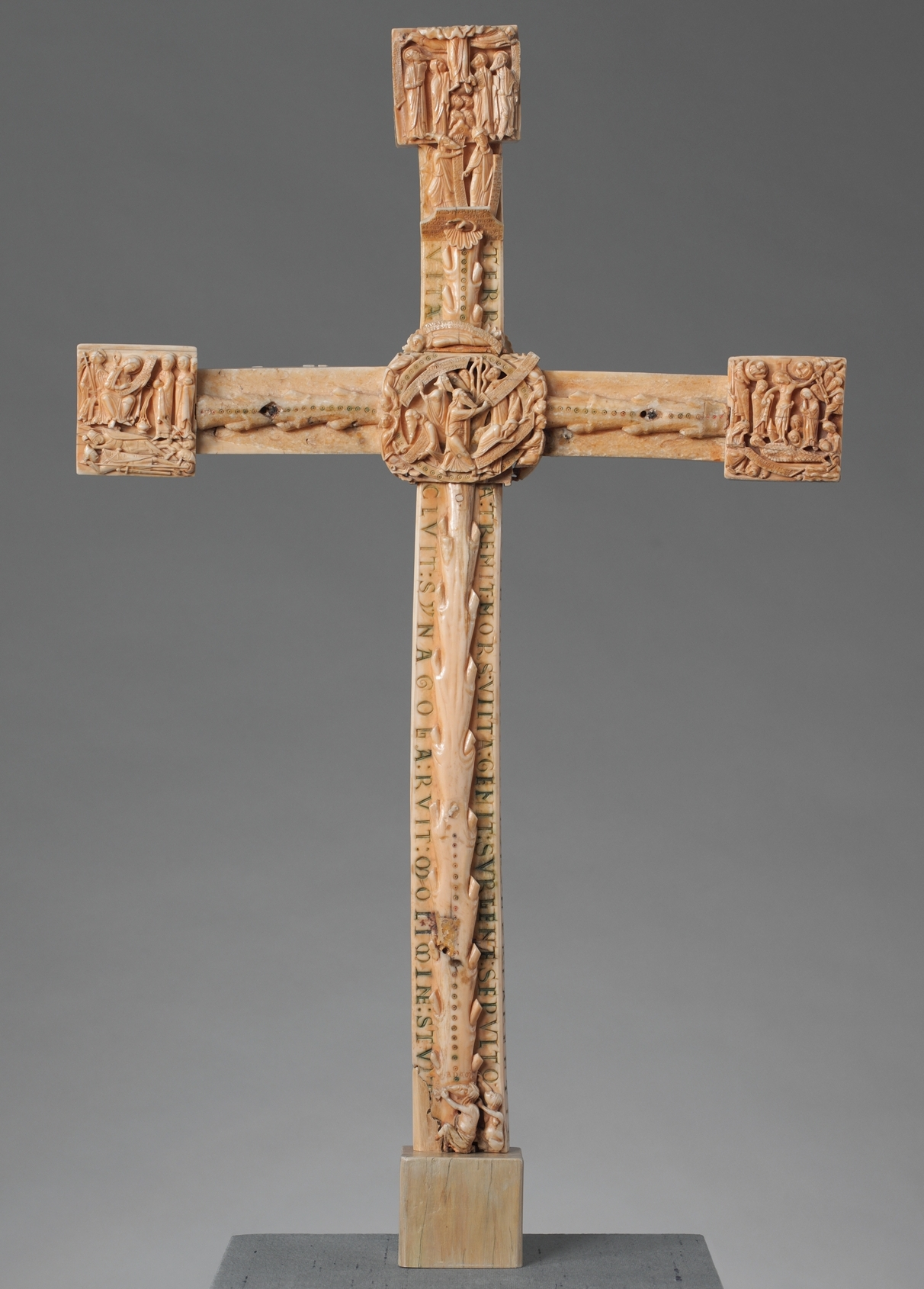
The Cloisters Cross, front

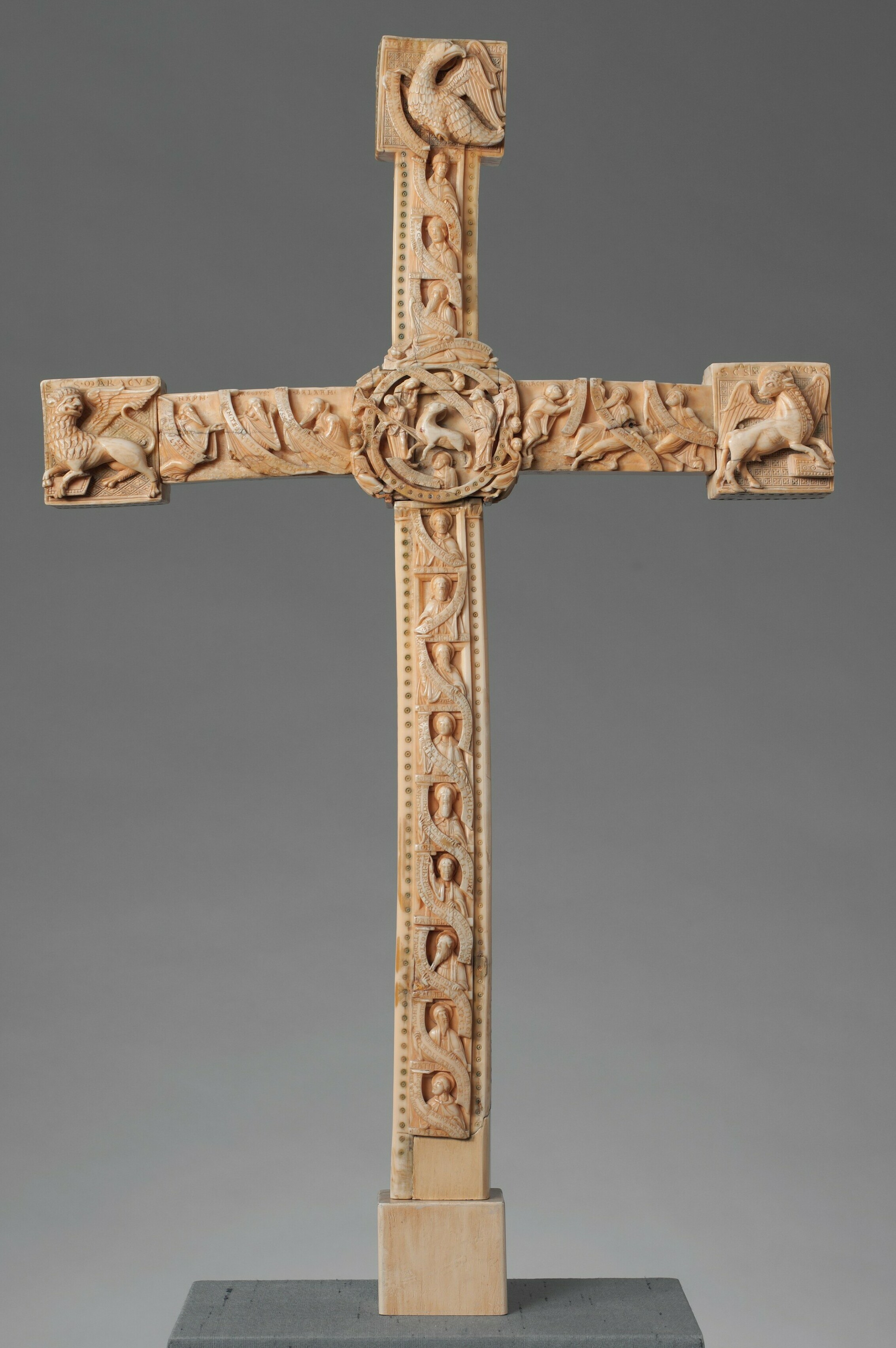
The Cloisters Cross - reverse

The Cloisters Cross (also known as the Bury St Edmunds Cross), is a complex 12th-century ivory Romanesque altar cross or processional cross. It is named after The Cloisters, part of the Metropolitan Museum of Art in New York, which acquired it in 1963.

The cross is usually said to have been carved in England between 1150 and 1160, although some scholars believe it is more likely to be central European. It is made from walrus ivory and measures 22 5/8 × 14 1/4 in. (57.5 × 36.2 cm). It includes highly detailed carvings on both sides and a number of inscriptions. The imagery features the crucifixion of Jesus and the symbols of the Evangelists. It is generally held to contain antisemitic images and texts, but this is subject to debate.

== Description ==
The carvings which cover both front and back sides include ninety-two intricately carved figures and ninety-eight inscriptions. The figures are only about one-half inch tall, and illustrate a number of Biblical persons and scenes. Each side consists of a central circular medallion and three square terminals, all of which contain highly detailed carvings. The front has the ascension of Jesus at top, his resurrection on the left, and the crucifixion on the right. The terminals on the reverse show the symbols of three of the Four Evangelists: John (the eagle), Mark (the lion) and Luke (the ox); the reverse contains a number of other depictions of Old Testament prophets. The now lost base presumably had Matthew's winged man on the reverse, while Christ before Caiaphas is assumed to have been at the front.

The Old Testament prophets on the reverse have banderoles containing quotations from their books.

== Antisemitic verses ==
The verses on the cross contain antisemitic texts. One reads Cham ridet dum nuda videt pudibunda parentis; Iudei risere Dei penam mor[ientis], or "Cham laughed when he saw his parents' shameful nudity; the Jews laughed at God's dying pains." Another states: Terra tremit mors victa gemit surgente sepulto; Vita cluit Synagoga ruit molimine stult[o], or in English, "The earth trembles, death groans as the buried one arises; Life is called, the Synagogue falls through its stupid endeavours." The inscription added to the cross by the Romans, instead of reading "Jesus of Nazareth, King of the Jews", is altered to "Jesus of Nazareth, King of Confessors."

The meter and style of the verses has been used to identify it with the Bury St Edmunds Abbey, where very similar verses originally on a choir screen have been recorded. Other, less harsh versions of the Cham verse circulated widely in example sermon texts in the following centuries.

== Interpretation ==
Interpretation of the cross is difficult, in part because the base of the cross is lost. An ivory plaque with a scene of Christ before Caiaphas is proposed as the base, but this is not accepted by all scholars. If the plaque was part of the base of the cross, this would reinforce an antisemitic intent, as it places the Jew Caiaphas as the judge responsible for Jesus' crucifixion.

The Metropolitan Museum of Art's website currently says: "Prominent among the inscriptions are several strong invectives against Jews. Though it is impossible to know precisely who commissioned this piece and with what aims, the cross certainly offers some indication of the antisemitism prevalent in England at this time. By the end of the thirteenth century, Jews were expelled from the country". This theme was developed in a book by Thomas Hoving, the curator involved when the Metropolitan acquired the cross, and later Director. Elizabeth C. Parker and Charles T. Little however have attempted to argue that the object is referring to the tradition of Christian-Jewish debate. Hoving's book was unkindly described by British academic Sandy Heslop as "an autobiographical romance … written in Raymond Chandler style". Stating that the book had not dealt with the antisemitism of the object head on, instead attempting to apply discretion to the topic, his review also expressed doubt that the cross was English, as a number of the images and themes, including the figure of Synagoga piercing the Lamb of God, and depictions of Jews wearing conical hats, imply a German or eastern European rather than English origin.

== Provenance ==
The name of the sculptor is unknown. Thomas Hoving, who managed its acquisition while associate curator at The Cloisters, concluded that it was carved by Master Hugo at Bury St Edmunds Abbey in Suffolk. However, beyond stylistic affinities in the carving and inscriptions, there is no certain evidence to suggest that the cross was even made in England; although this is accepted by most scholars, other places of origin such as Germany have been proposed.

Its provenance before it was acquired by the Croatian art collector Ante Topić Mimara (1898–1987) is unknown. Mimara had connections with Hermann Goering and showed part of the object in Rome to Vatican art historian Wolfgang Fritz Volbach during the Second World War, at which time it was not clean and well kept, implying that it had not been in the hands of a collector. Mimara eventually sold it to the Metropolitan in 1963. The British Museum had wanted to buy the cross but eventually declined because of Topić Mimara's inability to prove that he had full title to sell the cross. Hoving reportedly stayed up drinking coffee with Topić Mimara until the British Museum's option lapsed at midnight, and then purchased the cross immediately for 600,000 USD.

== Gallery ==
=== Front ===
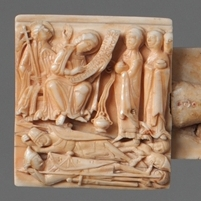
front, Easter plaque

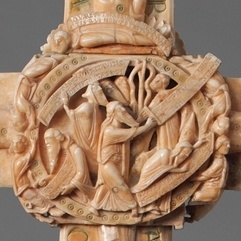
front, middle circle, Moses and the brazen serpent

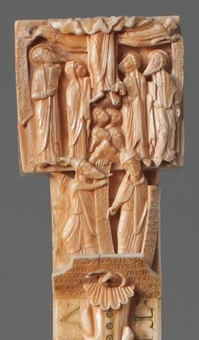
front, high priest and Pontius Pilate disputing

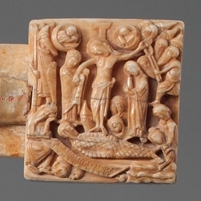
Good Friday plaque

=== Rear ===
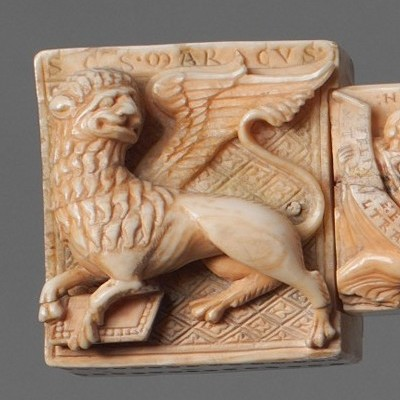
rear, lion of St. Mark

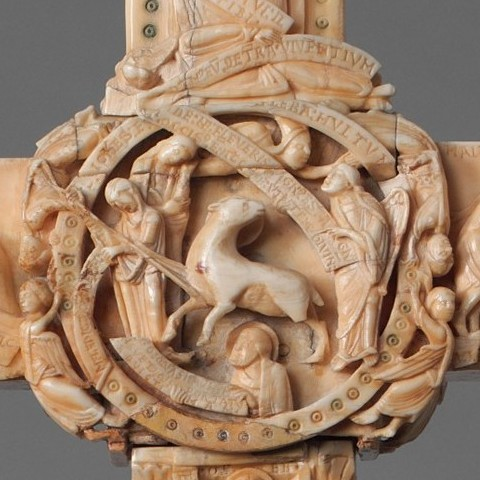
rear, lamb medallion with Synagoga

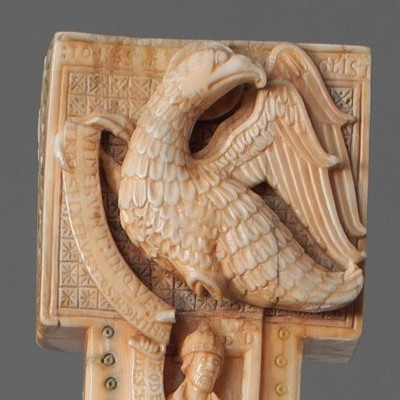
rear, eagle of St. John

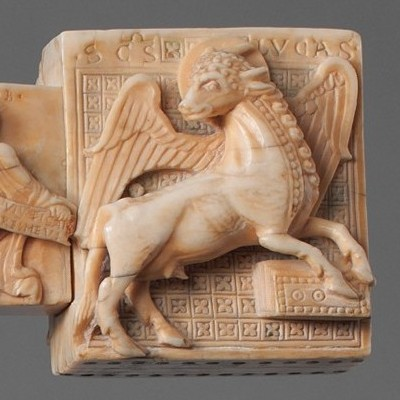
rear, ox of St. Luke

== See also ==
- Art theft and looting during World War II
- Quod scripsi, scripsi

== Sources ==
- Heslop, T.A. (1994). "Review: The Cloisters Cross: Its Art and Meaning". The Burlington Magazine. 136 (1096): 459–60.
- Hoving, Thomas. King of the Confessors. NY: Simon & Schuster, 1981
- Hoving, Thomas. King of the Confessors: A New Appraisal. Christchurch: Cybereditions Corporation, 2001
- Jones, Bernice (1991). "A Reconsideration of the Cloisters Ivory Cross with the Caiaphas Plaque Restored to Its Base". Gesta. 30 (1). University of Chicago Press: 65–88. doi:10.2307/767010. JSTOR 767010.
- Kiely, Alexandra (19 January 2019). "The Complicated Meaning and Mysterious Origin of The Cloisters Cross". Daily Art Magazine.
- Longland, Sabrina (1969). "A Literary Aspect of the Bury St. Edmunds Cross". Metropolitan Museum Journal. 2: 45–74. doi:10.2307/1512586. JSTOR 1512586.
- Metropolitan (2022). "The Cloisters Cross". Metropolitan.
- Parker, Elizabeth. "Editing the 'Cloisters Cross'". Gesta, volume 45, no. 2; 50th Anniversary of the International Center of Medieval Art, 2006. JSTOR 25067137
- Parker, Elizabeth; Little, Charles. The Cloisters Cross. NY: Metropolitan Museum of Art, 1994 Full online PDF from MMA
- Richmond, Colin (1992). "Englishness and Medieval Anglo-Jewry". In Kushner, Tony (ed.). The Jewish Heritage in British History. Frank Cass. pp. 42–59. ISBN 0714634646. OL 1710943M.
- Watson, Peter; Todeschini, Cecilia (2007). The Medici Conspiracy: The Illicit Journey of Looted Antiquities from Italy's Tomb Raiders to the World's Greatest Museums. New York: Public Affairs.
