= Speech scroll =

Illustrative device denoting speech in art

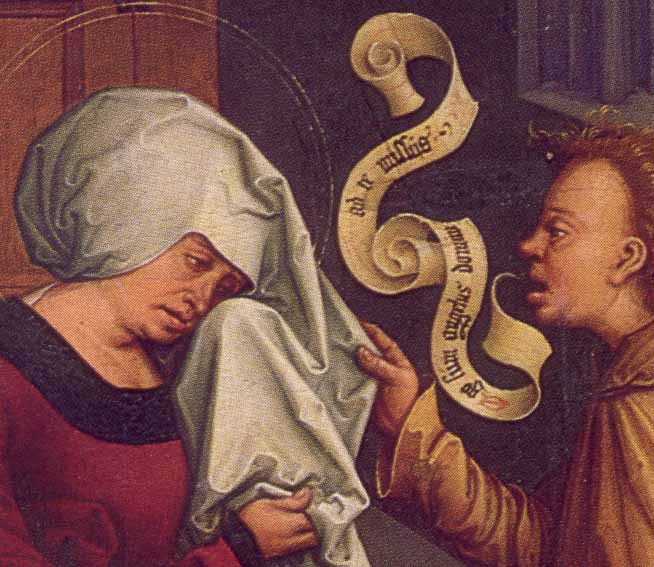
Detail from Bernhard Strigel's "Annunciation to Saint Anne".

In art history, a speech scroll (also called a banderole or phylactery) is an illustrative device denoting speech, song, or other types of sound.

Developed independently on two continents, the device was in use by artists in Mesoamerican cultures from as early as 650 BC until after the Spanish conquest in the 16th century, and separately in the 13th and 14th century by European painters. While European speech scrolls were drawn as if they were an actual unfurled scroll or strip of parchment, Mesoamerican speech scrolls are scroll-shaped, looking much like a question mark. It is used in heraldry for mottos or slogans and war-cries.

== Mesoamerica ==
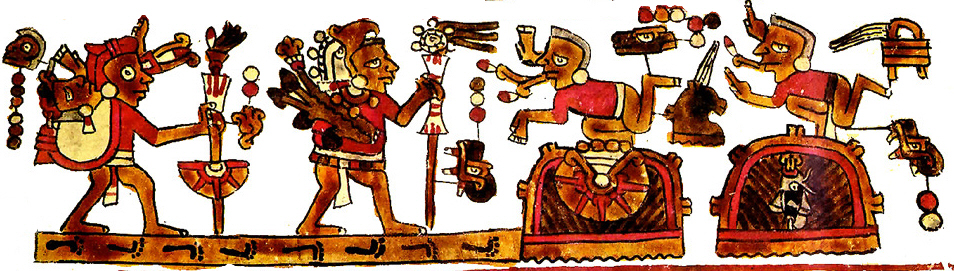
The two figures on the right show the red and white "flint knife" icon attached to their small speech scrolls, indicating that they are verbally attacking the travellers on the left. From page 7 of the Codex Selden.

A Teotihuacan stick-ball player with a bi-color speech scroll. Note the "tabs" along the outer edge of the speech scroll.

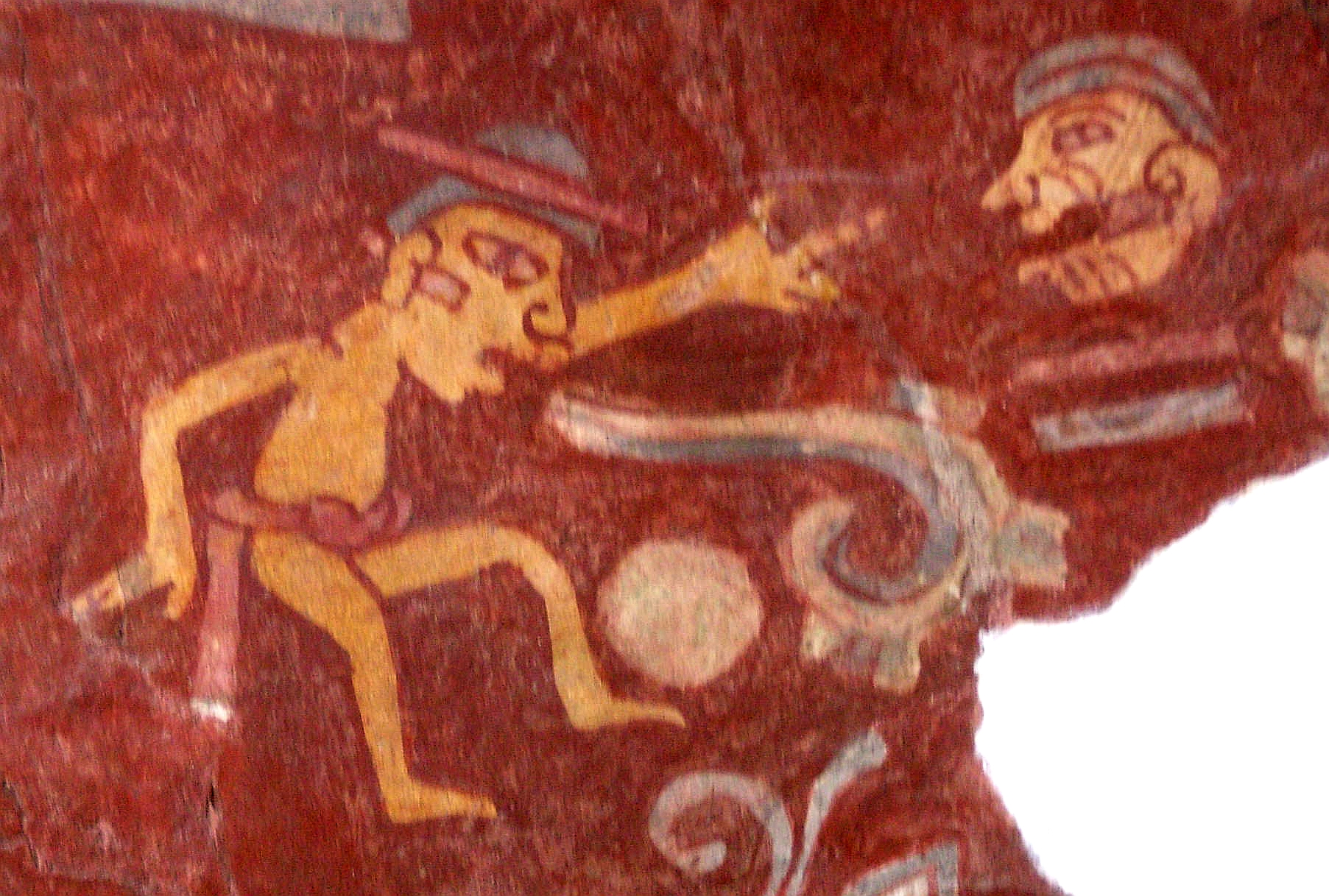
A mural in the ancient Mesoamerican city of Teotihuacan, Mexico, c. 2nd century)

Speech scrolls are found throughout the Mesoamerica area. An early example is an Olmec ceramic cylinder seal dated to c. 650 BC, where two lines emit from a bird's mouth followed by glyphs proposed to be "3 Ajaw," a ruler's name. The murals of the Classic era site at Teotihuacan are filled with speech scrolls, in particular tableaus in the Tepantitla compound—this mural, for example, has more than 20 speech scrolls.

In Mesoamerica, speech-scrolls are usually oriented upwards along the longest outer edge so that the central element (or "tongue") curves downward as it spirals. Some Mesoamerican scrolls are divided lengthwise with each side given a different shade. Glyphs or similar markings rarely appear on the Mesoamerican speech scroll, although "tabs"—small, triangular or square blocks—are sometimes seen along the outer edge. If the speech scroll represents a tongue, then the tabs may represent teeth, but their meaning or message, if any, is not known.

At times, speech scrolls are decorated with devices that describe the tone of the speech:

- In an engraving at the Maya site of Chichen Itza, a ruler's speech scroll takes the form of a serpent.
- A Spaniard's speech scroll in a 16th-century Aztec codex is decorated with feathers to denote "soft, smooth words".
- In another 16th-century codex, the Codex Selden, two Mixtec rulers (image above) are shown insulting two ambassadors through the use of "flint knife" icons attached to the speech scrolls.
- After the Spanish Conquest, the indigenous languages received adaptations of the Latin alphabet and many codices were sponsored to be written in this epoch, such as Codex Quinatzin, that combines speech scrolls with actual writing.

== European ==
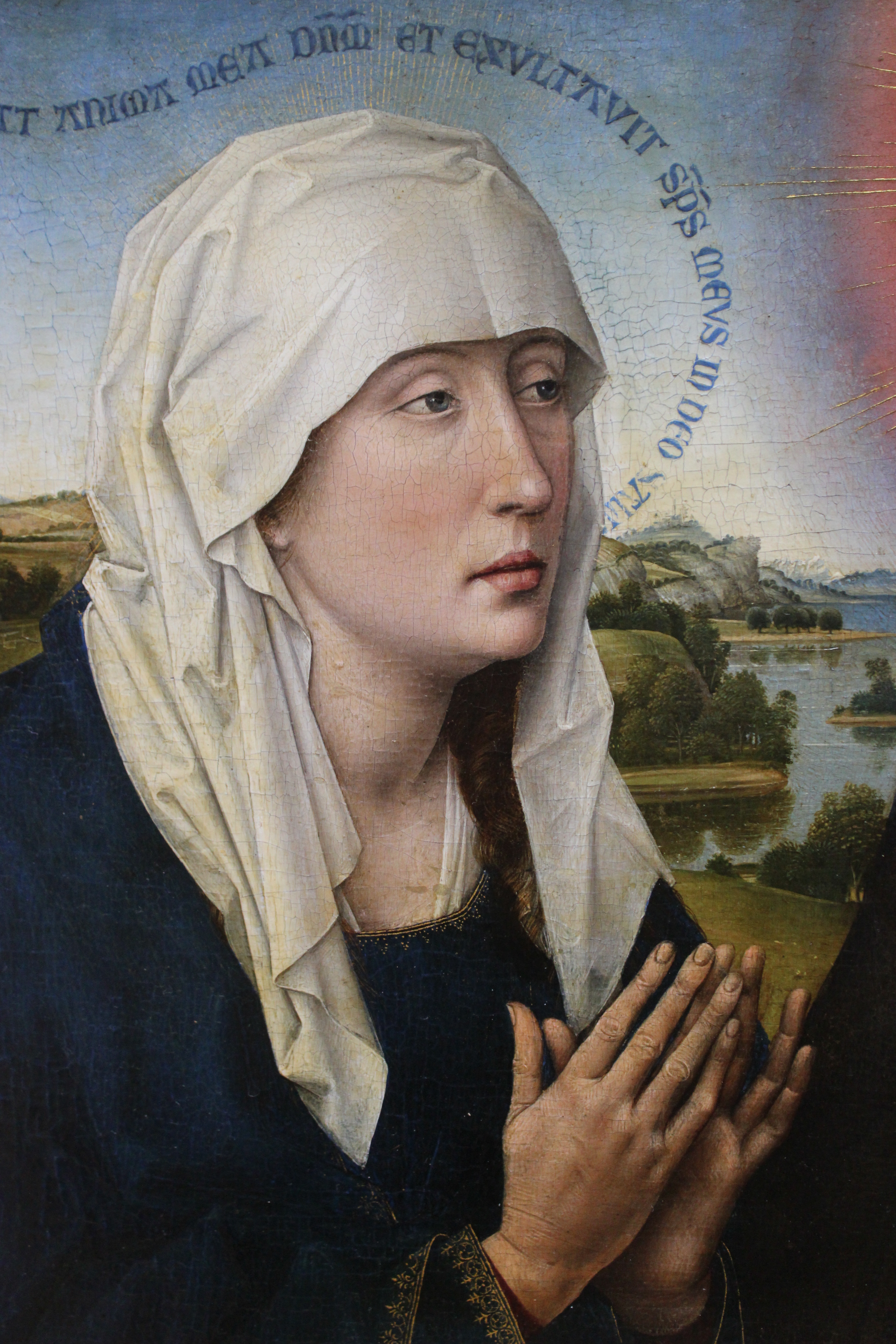
Detail of Rogier van der Weyden's c. 1452 Braque Triptych.

In contrast to the abstract nature of Mesoamerican speech scrolls, Medieval European speech scrolls or banderoles appear as actual scrolls, floating in apparent three-dimensional space (or in actual space in sculpture). They first become common at the start of the Gothic period. Previously, as in Byzantine art, spoken words, if they appeared at all, were usually painted alongside a figure; these are called tituli. However, earlier works using banderoles are the Aachen Gospels of Otto III (c. 975) and the 12th-century English Romanesque Cloisters Cross. The latter work demonstrates the use of banderoles as attributes for Old Testament prophets, to distinguish them from the book-carrying Four Evangelists of the New Testament and other Christian saints, a convention appearing in Italy in the 13th century. It may be seen in the Santa Trinita Maestà by Cimabue (Uffizi, 1280–90), Duccio's Maestà (1308–11), and other works. The convention had a historical appropriateness, as the Old Testament was originally written on scrolls, whereas nearly all surviving New Testament manuscripts are codices (like modern books). They may also be used for the words of angels, especially Gabriel's greeting to Mary in Annunciation scenes.

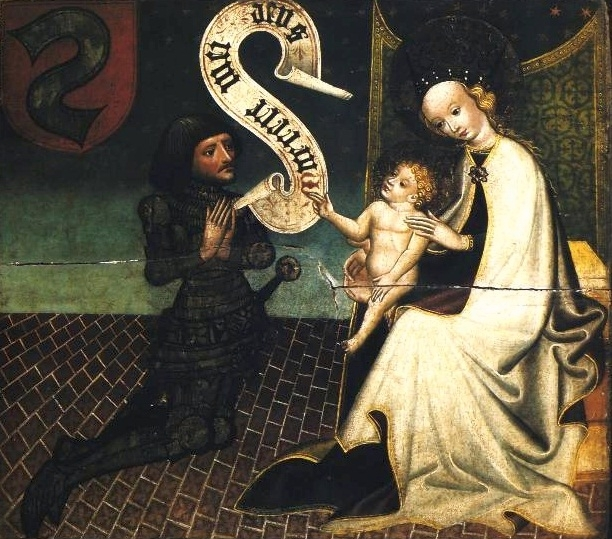
Epitaph of Jan of Ujazd, Anonymous, Lesser Poland, c. 1450

During the 14th century, quotations in banderoles increasingly allowed artists to include more complex ideas in their works, though for the moment usually in Latin, thus greatly restricting the audience that could follow them. In this context, medieval donor illustrations are of particular importance, as they recorded the names of the patrons as painted text and thus supplemented the purely pictorial information with readable content for the already literate urban mercantile elite.

European speech scrolls usually contain the spoken words, much like a modern-day speech balloon. The majority of these are in religious works and contain Biblical quotations from the figure depicted – Old Testament prophets for example, were often shown with an appropriate quotation from their work. Because the words are usually religious in nature, the speech scroll is often written in Latin even when appearing in woodcut illustrations for books written in the vernacular. This would also enable the illustration to be used in editions in other languages.

European speech scrolls may at times be seen in secular works as well and may also contain the name of a person to identify them. On carved figures the words would usually be painted on the scroll and have since worn away. In some Late Gothic and Renaissance works, and in architectural decoration, very elaborate empty banderoles seem to be for decorative purposes only. The European speech scroll fell out of favor largely due to an increasing interest in realism in painting; the halo had a similar decline.

== See also ==
- Banderole – a streamer or pennant
- Speech balloon

== General references ==
- Boone, Elizabeth (1994). Writing Without Words: Alternative Literacies in Mesoamerica and the Andes, Duke University Press.
- Coggins, Clement Chase (1992). "Pure Language & Lapidary Prose", in New Theories on the Ancient Maya, Elin C. Danien and Robert J. Sharer, Eds., University of Pennsylvania Museum.
- famsi. "John Pohl's - Ancient Books - Mixtec Group Codices - Codex Selden". FAMSI.
- Hilmo, Maidie (2004). Medieval Images, Icons, and Chaucer Illustrated English Literary Texts: From Ruthwell Cross to the Ellesmere Chaucer, Ashgate Publishing.
- Holt, Dennis, "About the Endangered Language Fund Logo", accessed November 2007.
- Kantorowicz, Ernst Hartwig (1997). The King's Two Bodies: A Study in Mediaeval Political Theology. Princeton University Press. p. 67. ISBN 978-0-691-01704-4.
- Ladis, Andrew & Maginnis, Hayden B. J. (1997), Painting in the Age of Giotto: A Historical Reevaluation, Penn State Press, ISBN 0-271-02091-1, ISBN 978-0-271-02091-4, google books
- Obermair, Hannes (2014), "The Use of Records in Medieval Towns: The Case of Bolzano, South Tyrol", in Marco Mostert; Anna Adamska (eds.), Writing and the Administration of Medieval Towns: Medieval Urban Literacy I, Utrecht Studies in Medieval History, vol. 27, Turnhout: Brepols, pp. 49–68, doi:10.1484/M.USML-EB.1.101928, ISBN 978-2-503-54959-0
- Petersen, Robert S. (2011). Comics, Manga, and Graphic Novels: A History of Graphic Narratives. ABC-CLIO. p. 19. ISBN 978-0-313-36330-6.
- Pohl, Mary; Pope, Kevin O.; Nagy, Christopher von (2002). "Olmec Origins of Mesoamerican Writing", in Science, vol. 298, pp. 1984–1987.
- Wishart Trevor (1966). On Sonic Art. Routledge.
