= Ecclesia and Synagoga =

Pair of subjects in medieval art, representing Judaism and Christianity

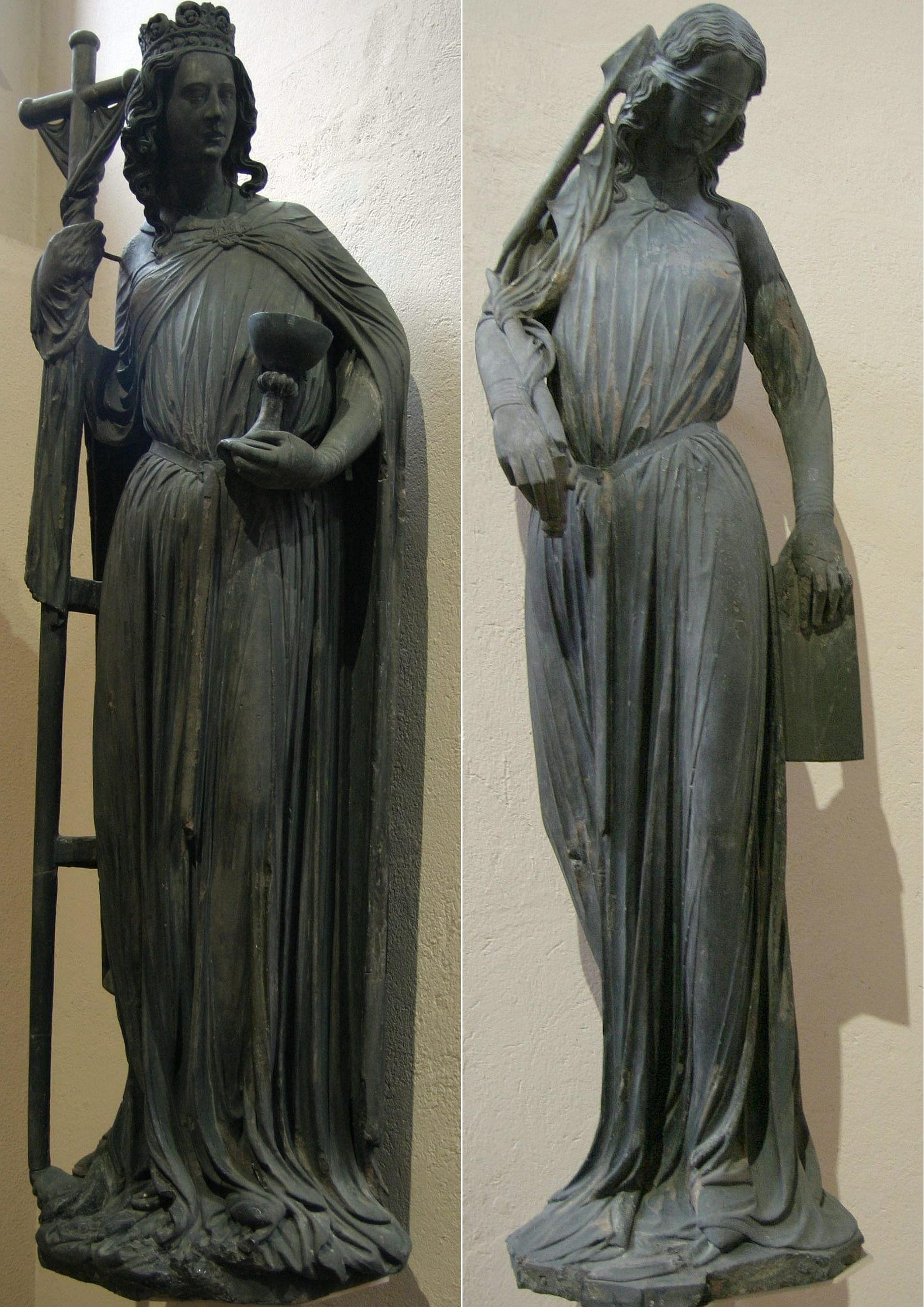
The original Ecclesia and Synagoga from the portal of Strasbourg Cathedral, now in the museum and replaced by replicas

Ecclesia and Synagoga, or Ecclesia et Synagoga in Latin, meaning "Church and Synagogue" (the order sometimes reversed), are a pair of figures personifying the Church and the Jewish synagogue, that is to say Judaism, found in medieval Christian art. They often appear sculpted as large figures on either side of a church portal, as in the most famous examples, those at Strasbourg Cathedral. They may also be found standing on either side of the cross in scenes of the Crucifixion, especially in Romanesque art, and less frequently in a variety of other contexts.

The two female figures are usually young and attractive; Ecclesia is generally adorned with a crown, chalice and cross-topped staff, looking confidently forward. In contrast, Synagoga is blindfolded and drooping, carrying a broken lance (possibly an allusion to the Holy Lance that stabbed Christ) and the Tablets of the Law or Torah scrolls that may even be slipping from her hand. The staff and spear may have pennants flying from them. In images of the Crucifixion, Ecclesia may hold a chalice that catches the blood spurting from the side of Christ; she often holds the chalice as an attribute in other contexts. Attributes sometimes carried by Synagoga include a male sheep or goat or just its head, signifying Old Testament sacrifice, in contrast to Ecclesia's chalice which represents the Christian Eucharist. The Ram also signifies alleged Jewish lustfulness and supposed Judaic focus on the flesh, in contrast to the Lamb, signifying the importance of the spirit in Christianity. In turn, Synagoga's female vulnerability and blindness suggest a raped woman and untrustworthiness. If not blindfolded, Synagoga usually looks down. Other elements suggest defeat. Ecclesia has an earlier history, and in medieval art Synagoga occasionally appears alone in various contexts, for example on the Cloisters Cross, but the pair, or Ecclesia by herself, are far more common. Further subjects where the pair may sometimes be found are the Tree of Jesse, and the Nativity.

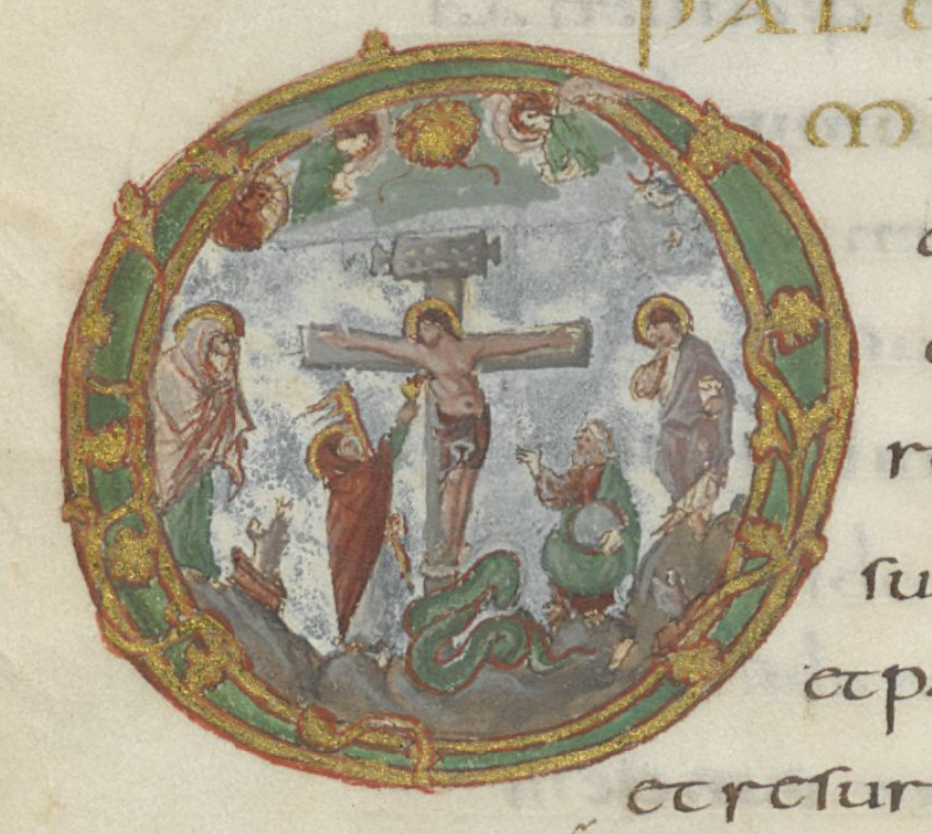
The first appearance of Ecclesia and Synagoga (as an old man) in the Drogo Sacramentary, c. 830

The figures of Ecclesia and Synagoga are sometimes traced to the influence of the 5th-century Altercatio Ecclesiae et Synagogae, a Latin dialogue from Roman Africa. The first appearance of such figures in a Crucifixion is in a historiated initial in the Drogo Sacramentary of c. 830, but though Ecclesia already has most of her usual features already present, the figure representing the Jews or the Old Covenant is here a seated white-haired old man. The pair, now with a female Jewish partner, are then found in several later Carolingian carved ivory relief panels of the Crucifixion for book covers, dating from around 870, and remain common in miniatures and various small works until the 10th century. They are then less common in Crucifixions in the 11th century, but reappear in the 12th century in a more strongly contrasted way that emphasizes the defeat of Synagoga; it is at this point that a blindfolded Synagoga with a broken lance becomes usual. The figures continue to be found in Crucifixions until the early 14th century, and occur later in various contexts but are increasingly less common. The surviving portal figures mainly date from the 13th century.

== Background in literature ==
The relationship between Church and Synagogue was discussed for a long period, ultimately influencing the depictions found in later visual representations. The tone of these varied in their tolerance or otherwise. Augustine, for example, depicts the Old Testament as being the same as the new, but "covered with a veil". The Altercatio Ecclesiae et Synagogae is in this tradition, popularised in Europe much later as larger numbers of Jews arrived. The idea of Synagoga as blind can be found in this literature. Another common comparison made is to equate the Synagogue with a concubine or female slave, and the Jews to her illegitimate offspring, while the Church is the true Bride, sometimes employing the story of Abraham's children by Hagar and Sarah to complete the metaphor.

== Meaning ==
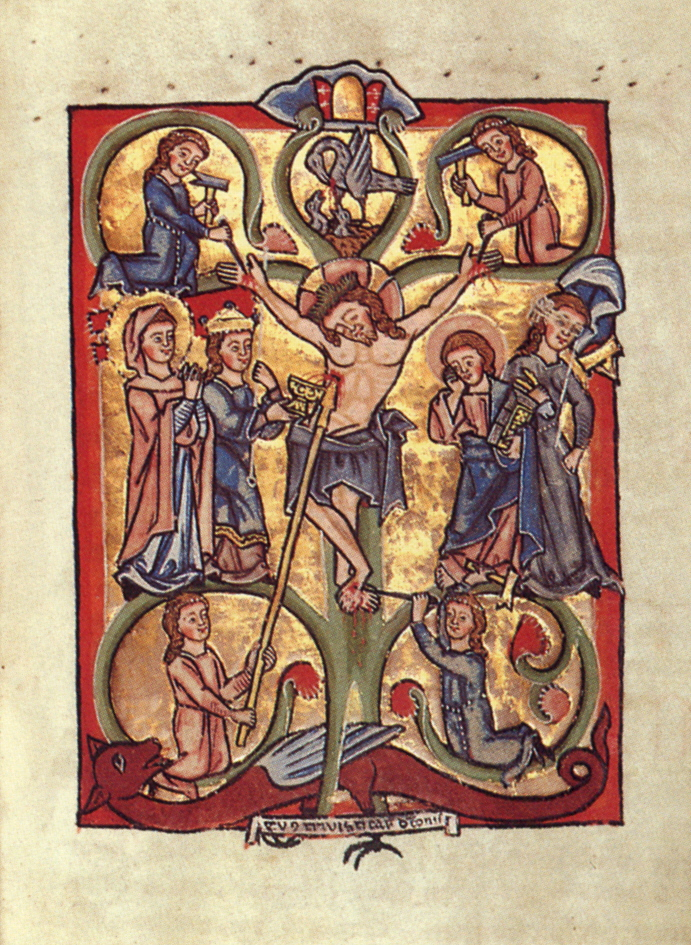
Ecclesia, left, with chalice, and Synagoga, right, blindfold, turned away and dropping her crown. She is also holding a Ram's head, a symbol of Jewish sacrificial practices and attachment to the flesh, in a Crucifixion from a German psalter, c. 1260

The medieval figures reflect the Christian belief, sometimes called Supersessionism, that Jesus was the Jewish Messiah, and that Judaism as a religion was therefore made unnecessary, by its own tenets, once Christianity was established, and that all Jews should convert. Today opposed by dual-covenant theology, this belief was universal in the medieval church. Synagoga's blindfold reflected the refusal of medieval Jews to "see" this point, which was regarded as stubborn. The Gospel of Matthew (27, 51) related that the Veil of the Temple, covering the entrance to the Holy of Holies, tore at the moment of Christ's death on the cross, which was taken to symbolize the moment of the replacement of Judaism by Christianity as the true religion, hence the presence of the pair in Crucifixion scenes.

The blind covering Synagoga's eyes derived from the letter of Saint Paul at II Corinthians 3:13-16:

We are not like Moses, who would put a veil over his face to prevent the Israelites from seeing the end of what was passing away. 14 But their minds were made dull, for to this day the same veil remains when the old covenant is read. It has not been removed, because only in Christ is it taken away. 15 Even to this day when Moses is read, a veil covers their hearts. 16 But whenever anyone turns to the Lord, the veil is taken away.

The figure of Synagoga is usually shown as in some way fallen. The blindfold is also symbolic of this, but other indications can include presentation in a prone position, or possessing a broken staff, or a crown or scroll that is slipping. Sometimes a devil or serpent rather than a blindfold shields her eyes from the word of God. This contrasts with the upright presentation of the victorious Ecclesia.

The sculpted portal figures are generally found on the cathedrals of larger cities in northern Europe that had significant Jewish communities, especially in Germany, and apart from their theological significance, were certainly also intended to remind Jews of their place in a Christian society, by projecting "an ideal of Jewish submission within an ideally ordered Christian realm". They are therefore very prominent, but not very common. Many Jews, like Christians, conducted business in churches, and would pass the figures as they came and went.

Leo Spitzer has claimed that unlike many medieval depictions of Jewish figures (other than those from the Hebrew Bible), there is very rarely any element of a hostile caricature in the depiction of Synagoga who, if clearly defeated, is often strikingly beautiful, as at Strasbourg. Henry Abramson however contextualises the figure of Synagoga as being particularly marginalised, as both Jewish and a woman. As Synagoga is also blindfolded, she would be seen as vulnerable, particularly to rape. Within a medieval mindset, any form of extramarital sex including rape would make a woman permanently untrustworthy. The figure of Synagoga is often accompanied by a Ram, symbolising unrestrained Jewish sexual forces and a focus on the flesh rather than the spirit, symbolised by the Christian Lamb. Sometimes Synagoga will interact with the Ram in a way to suggest lust and even oral or penetrative sex.

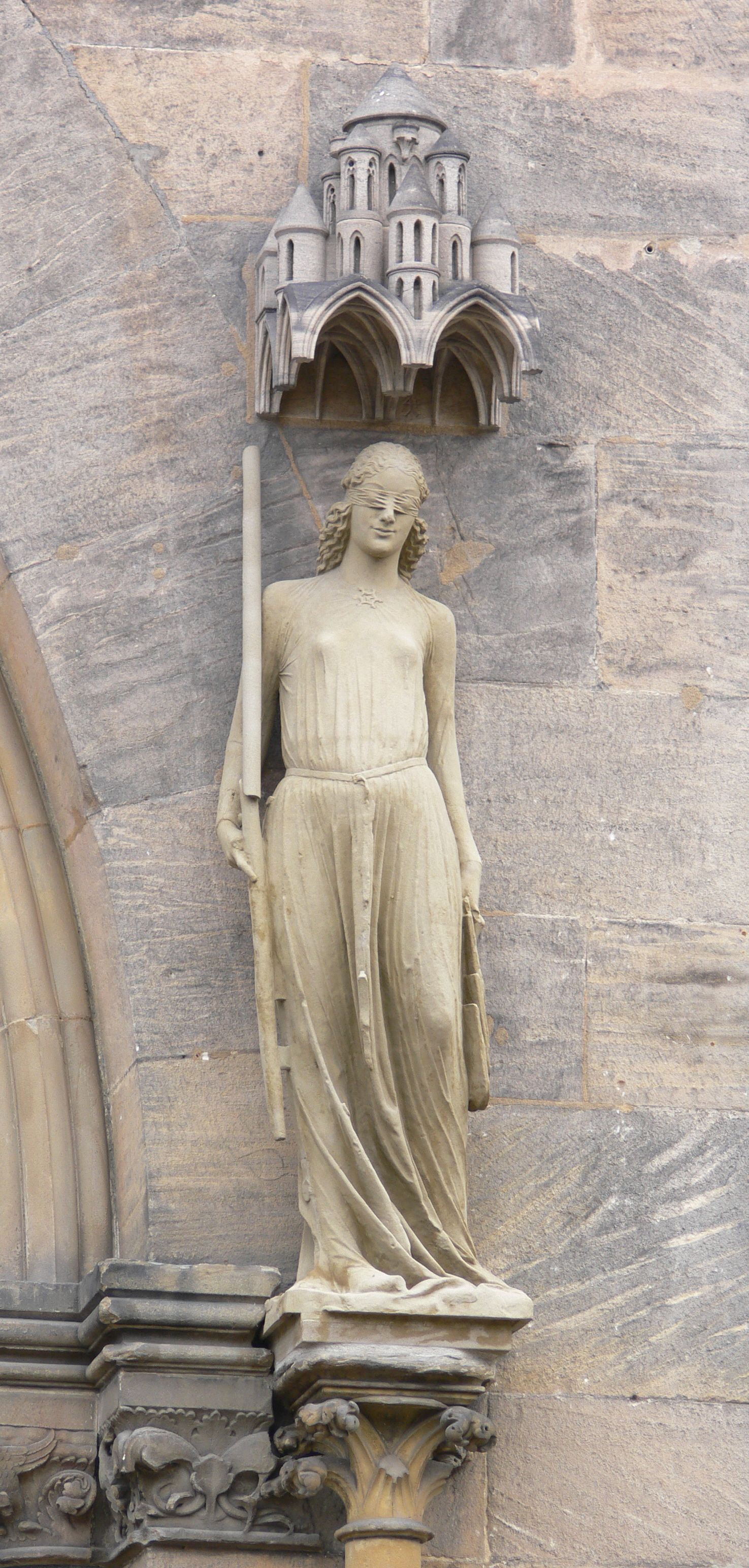
Synagoga from the 13th-century pair at Bamberg Cathedral

Some English depictions include a horned Moses accompanying Synagoga. A horned Moses has usually been thought to be purely the result of a mistranslation by Jerome, but some of the medieval depictions have been interpreted as overtly antisemitic.

=== Evolution of the imagery ===
It is often recognised that the hostility implicit in later depictions is not found in the earliest ones. Nina Rowe relates the figures to Late Antique uses of personifications, including contrasting figures of orthodox Christianity and either paganism or heresy, especially Arianism, and suggests that the identity of "Synagoga" was more variable before the millennium, with Jerusalem or its Temple being alternative identifications. She describes the revival in use of the pair, now couched in more combative terms, as a reaction both to the influx into Western Europe of larger Jewish populations during the late 10th to the 12th centuries, and also to the Twelfth-century Renaissance, which involved contacts between Christian and Jewish scholars, who discussed their different interpretations of the Hebrew Bible. This made Christian theologians, mostly monastic, much more aware than previously of the existence of a vibrant Jewish theological tradition subsequent to the writing of the Hebrew Bible. Previously, Early Medieval Christians had likened the Jews to, as they were described by Augustine, "librarians" or "capsarii", a class of servant that was in charge of carrying books, but did not actually read them. The increased contacts therefore had the paradoxical effect of making monasteries more aware that there was an alternative tradition of exegesis and scholarship, and stimulating them to counter this.

There was also a tradition of dramatized disputations between the two figures, which reached its height somewhat later than depictions in art, but had a similar geographical distribution. Usage of the figures declined in the Renaissance and later periods, as the religious dimension of antisemitism receded, but continued in Passion plays up to the present. During the 14th century the pair become much rarer, replaced in Crucifixion scenes by large numbers of figures of soldiers and disciples, but some examples are found in the 15th century and later.

== Examples and distribution ==
There are examples on the portals of the cathedrals at Minden, Bamberg and Freiburg Minster in Germany, as well as Notre Dame de Paris and Metz in France. In England there are remains of pairs, after damage or destruction in the English Reformation, from the cathedrals of Rochester, Lincoln, and Winchester; claims that such remains also existed at Salisbury, frequently repeated in internet sources, can not be substantiated. (Note: The misunderstanding originates in the Ecclesia et Synagoga article on the subject in the Encyclopaedia Judaica. However, the sources quoted there do not speak of representations of the pair at Salisbury Catheral, but in two medieval illustrated manuscripts, possibly originating in the Salisbury area (Sarum Missal, John Rylands Library Ms. 24 f.153r and Amesbury Psalter, All Souls Library Oxford Ms. 24 f. 5), cf. Edwards 1955) A single figure of Synagoga can be found at Hereford. The cathedrals of the two largest commercial centres, London and York, both date from later periods, but may have had them on earlier buildings. Surviving from the chapter house of York Minster are over life-size paintings on oak from a group of 48 supporting the roof vault and stained glass figures from the vestibule. Synagoga and a horned Moses without Ecclesia appear in the window of the north choir aisle at Canterbury Cathedral, while a number of English church figures, screens and fonts also present the pair. A number of English manuscripts also have drawings of the pair, sometimes also with a horned Moses. Châlons Cathedral and the Basilique Saint-Denis have versions in stained glass, respectively large and small. Synagoga also appears on the Cloisters Cross, piercing the Lamb.

A rare carved misericord at Erfurt Cathedral shows the pair jousting on horses; unsurprisingly, Ecclesia is winning. As with many misericords, this was probably intended as a humorous version of iconography treated with full seriousness in more prominent locations.

== Ecclesia alone ==
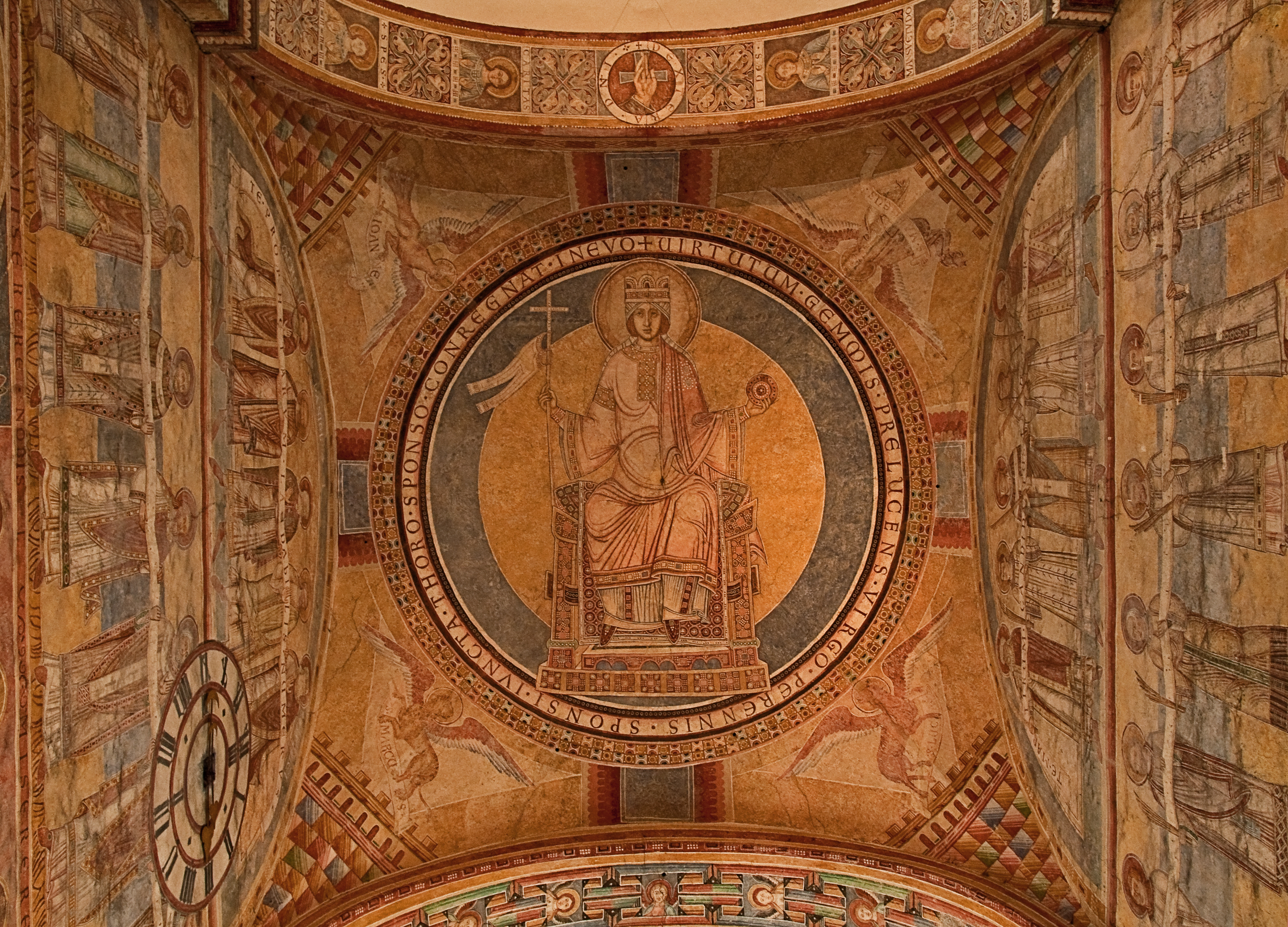
Ecclesia enthroned, Prüfening Abbey, Bavaria, 12th century

The personification of Ecclesia preceded her coupling with Synagoga by several centuries. A number of biblical passages, including those describing Christ as a "bridegroom" led early in the history of the church to the concept of the church as the Bride of Christ, which was shown in art using a queenly personification. The church was in this context sometimes conflated with the Virgin Mary, leading to the concept of Maria Ecclesia, or Mary as the church, which is an element, now usually unrecognised, in the theology behind much of the art showing the Virgin as a queen.

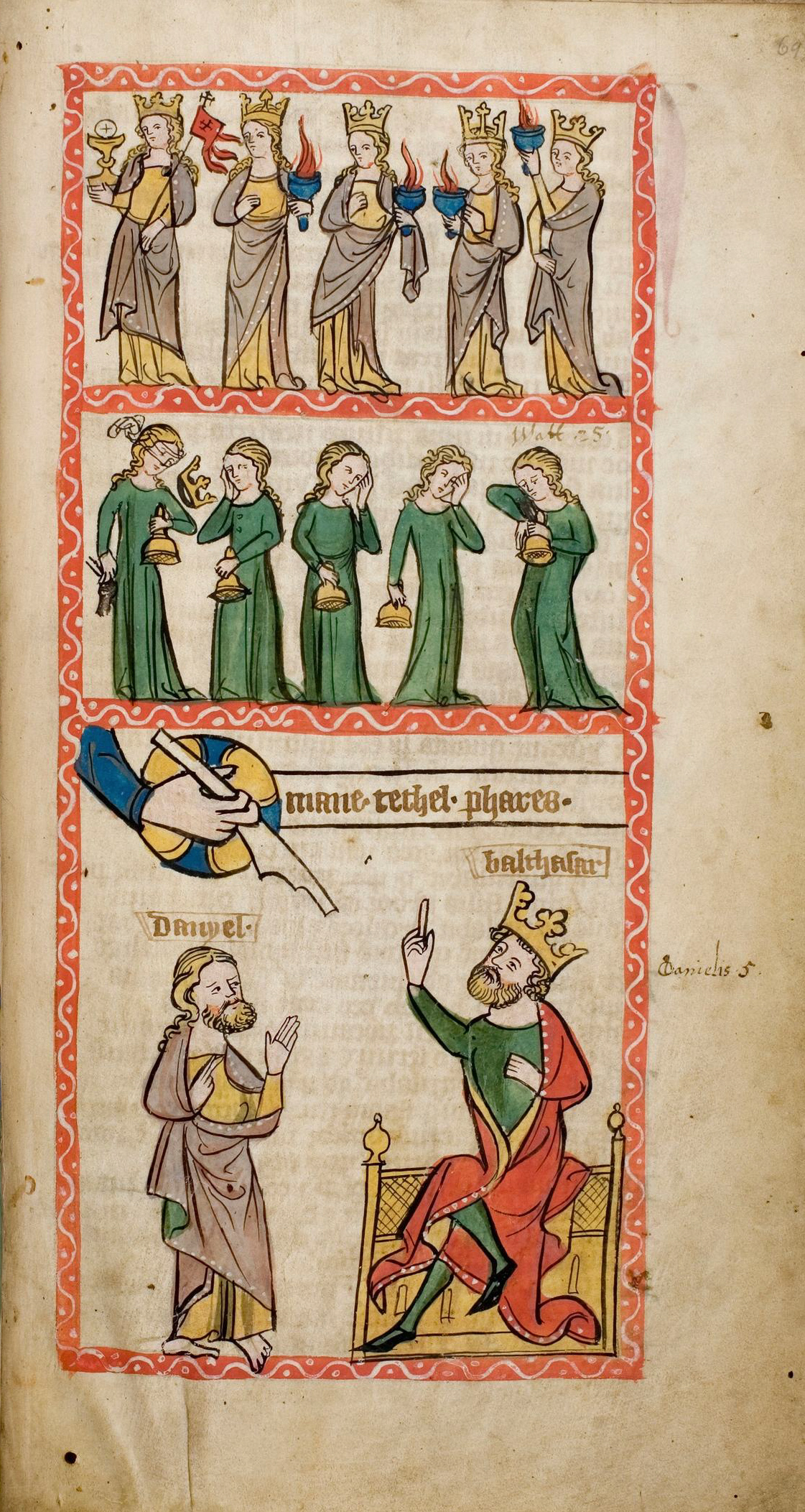
Parable of the Wise and Foolish Virgins (top registers), Speculum Humanae Salvationis, Darmstadt, c. 1360

An earlier appearance of two female figures is in the now heavily restored apse mosaic of Santa Pudenziana in Rome (402-417), where two female figures behind a row of apostles hold wreaths over Saints Paul and Peter respectively, and towards an enthroned Christ. These are usually taken to represent the "Church of the Gentiles" and "Church of the Jews" - i.e. groups within the Early Christian Church which still reflected their pre-conversion backgrounds. The figures are hardly differentiated. A mosaic at Santa Sabina in Rome appears to have similar figures, though the Peter and Paul are now missing and only known from an old drawing.

== Wise and Foolish Virgins ==
High medieval depictions of the New Testament parable of the Wise and Foolish Virgins sometimes used the iconography of Ecclesia and Synagoga. This is not done in the German portal sculptures, several on the same buildings that feature figures of Ecclesia and Synagoga, as for example Strasbourg and Minden Cathedrals. It can be seen very clearly in the Darmstadt manuscript of the Speculum Humanae Salvationis illustrated here, from about 1360, where the leading virgins of each group have all the attributes of Ecclesia and Synagoga, and the lamp of the leading Wise Virgin has become a chalice. The interpretation of the parable in terms of wise Christian and foolish Jewish virgins, the latter missing the wedding party, long remained common in sermons and theological literature, and has been argued to be present in Handel's oratorio Messiah (1741).

== Modern developments ==
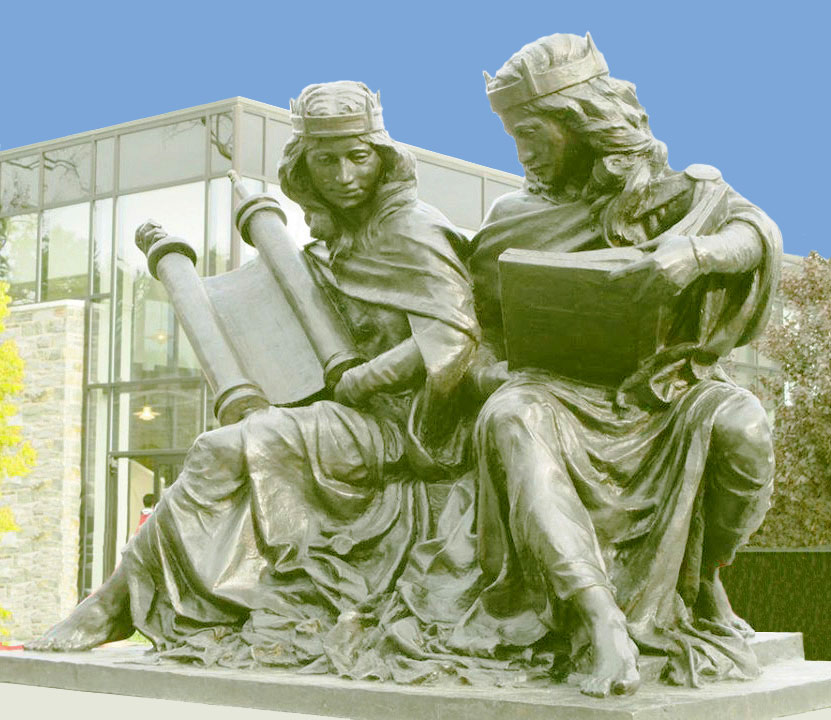
Synagoga and Ecclesia in Our Time, Saint Joseph's University, as of July 2016.

The pair as a subject has often been avoided by modern artists, but after Napoleon occupied Milan in 1805, he ordered the completion of the façade of Milan Cathedral, to include secularized representations of Synagoga and Ecclesia, symbolizing the legal equality of all religions under the French regime. Synagoga stands upright, holding the Ten Commandments, while Ecclesia is portrayed as the Lady of Liberty, complete with crown and torch.

They each have a painting (1919) by John Singer Sargent in the Boston Public Library, as part of a larger scheme.

In 2014, Saint Joseph's University in Philadelphia commissioned a large sculpture by Joshua Koffman showing the pair in harmony. The sculpture was commissioned to mark the 50th anniversary of the Nostra aetate declaration that called for a more cooperative approach to the relationship between Catholicism and Judaism. Both personifications wear crowns and hold their respective Holy Scriptures, representing their respective covenants with God and suggesting the notion of learning from one another. The finalised bronze cast of the sculpture was dedicated on 25 September 2015 and blessed by Pope Francis on 27 September. Pope Francis was a natural choice to bless the sculpture as only a year or so prior to the installation, Pope Francis wrote:

We hold the Jewish people in special regard because their covenant with God has never been revoked, for “the gifts and the call of God are irrevocable” (Rom 11:29). … Dialogue and friendship with the children of Israel are part of the life of Jesus’ disciples. The friendship which has grown between us makes us bitterly and sincerely regret the terrible persecutions which they have endured, and continue to endure, especially those that have involved Christians. God continues to work among the people of the Old Covenant and to bring forth treasures of wisdom which flow from their encounter with his word. For this reason, the Church also is enriched when she receives the values of Judaism.—Pope Francis, Evangelii Gaudium, §247-249.
