= Altercatio Ecclesiae et Synagogae =

Start of the Altercatio in a ninth-century manuscript from Saint Gall

The Altercatio Ecclesiae et Synagogae is an anonymous Latin dialogue between Ecclesia and Synagoga, personifications of the Church (Christianity) and the Synagogue (Judaism). It was written in the fifth century, probably in Roman Africa. Throughout the Middle Ages, it was falsely attributed to Augustine.

The fictional dialogue has a courtroom setting. It is a Christian apologia and a polemic against Judaism.

== Date, authorship and sources ==
The Altercatio was probably written after 438, when Jews were forbidden by law from holding public office in the Roman Empire. By reference to Christian emperors, it may be argued that the text was written before the fall of the Western Roman Empire in 476. This is not certain, but the text was probably written in the fifth century. The oldest known copy is from the ninth century. The text may have been known in Spain by 673. According to Jocelyn Hillgarth, Julian of Toledo used its criticism of Judaism as a model for his criticism of Gaul when writing the Insultatio in tyrannidem Galliae in the aftermath of the revolt of Paulus.

The Altercatio was probably written in Roman Africa, as judged by its author's use of Cyprian of Carthage's Testimonia and by the use of the title Basileion for the Books of Kings, a title favourd by African authors. Biblical quotations, drawn from Cyprian, correspond to the Vetus Latina. The supersessionist theology of the Altercatio is drawn mainly from Cyprian. His view of "the providential role of the Roman Empire in the Christianization of the world" is taken from Ambrose of Milan. A source unique to him is Roman law. Desiderius Erasmus first noted that the author was familiar with the law. He may have been a lawyer.

== Synopsis ==
The Altercatio begins with a first-person introduction establishing a courtroom setting where two ladies will dispute the rightful inheritance of God's promises in the Old Testament. The rest of the work consists of the back and forth comments of the litigants, the Church (Ecclesia) and the Synagogue (Synagoga).

First, Synagoga argues that the prophets were sent to her, but Ecclesia responds that she killed them. Synagoga then argues that she is the more ancient, but Ecclesia responds that there has been a reversal of roles and the elder now serves the younger, as Esau served Jacob. This leads to a debate about the status of Jews in the Empire, with Synagoga defending her freedom and Ecclesia point to her loss of full civil rights.

Synagoga argues that even Jesus was sent to the Jews, but Ecclesia retorts that the Jews are all the more culpable for having rejected him. She does not levy the standard accusation of Jewish deicide. The text then turns to the question of circumcision versus the sign of the cross with reference to the Prophets. At the end, Synagoga admits that she did not heed the Prophets and misinterpreted them.

== Language and genre ==
Dorothea Weber describes the Latin of the Altercatio as "bombastic-stilted". At times it is even incomprehensible. It contains a single hapax legomenon in pompatilis at line 64. Certain phrases are also found in the writings of Petrus Chrysologus, Cassiodorus and Ruricius. The highly rhetorical style belongs to the fifth and sixth centuries.

The Altercatio's dialogue form was inspired by the contemporary Dialogue of Simon and Theophilus of Evagrius Gallus. It differs from the Dialogue in giving a situation for the debate (a court of law). The anonymous Consultationes Zacchei christiani et Apollonii philosophi also has a first-person introduction, but like the Dialogue it lacks situational context. A context is given in Jerome's Altercatio Luciferiani et orthodoxi and a courtroom setting specifically in the pseudo-Augustinian Collatio Augustini cum Pascentio. The courtroom setting may reflect actual debates that took place between the Nicene Orthodox and Arians in the Vandal Kingdom in Africa in the fifth century, as recorded in the Collatio Augustini cum Maximino.

The most unique aspect of the Altercatio Eclesiae et Synagogae is its use of personifications rather than fictitious or fictionalized persons. The nearest text in terms of genre—a "polemical dialogue between" the personifications Church and Synagogue—is the anonymous tenth-century Altercatio Aecclesiae contra Synagogam, possibly written in England and potentially influenced by the Altercatio Ecclesiae et Synagogae.

== Manuscripts and editions ==
The Altercatio appears to have travelled from North Africa to Spain, then across the Pyrenees to Gaul and finally across the Alps into Italy. There are at least twelve surviving manuscripts and three lost ones. The ninth, eleventh and twelfth centuries have three manuscripts each. The latest manuscripts are from the fifteenth century. The earliest known manuscript, now lost, was catalogued at the Abbey of Reichenau in 835–842. The earliest surviving copy is found in Munich, Bayerische Staatsbibliothek, CLM 15819, copied in Salzburg during the archiepiscopate of Liupram (836–859). This is slightly older than the copy found in Saint Gall, Stiftsbibliothek 132, copied during the abbacy of Grimald (850–872). All the surviving manuscripts belong to a single family (descended from a single hyparchetype of about the eighth century), with the exception of manuscript 247 from Monte Cassino, copied in Beneventan script in the twelfth century. The former manuscript family attributes it to Augustine of Hippo.

Prior to 1955, the Altercatio was printed many times, always printed with Augustine's works. The editio princeps was printed by Bonifacius Amerbach in Basel in 1506 as part of Augustine's works. It was reprinted with minor changes by Erasmus in 1528. He already recognized that it was not by Augustine. Today, it is universally regarded as pseudo-Augustinian. A critical edition based on all known manuscripts was published by Jocelyn Hillgarth in 1999. The Altercatio is usually cited by Hillgarth's line numbers. A full English translation of Hillgarth's edition was made by Michael Brinks in 2009.

== Bibliography ==
- Brinks, Michael J. (2009). The Altercatio Ecclesiae et Synagogae as a Late Antique Anti-Jewish Polemic (Master's thesis). Western Michigan University.
- Hillgarth, Jocelyn N., ed. (1999). Altercatio ecclesiae et synagogae. Brepols.
- Weber, Dorothea (2010). "The Altercatio Ecclesiae et Synagogae from a Classicist's Point of View". Millennium. 7 (1): 67–86. doi:10.1515/9783110223057.67.
