= Coralline rock =

Rock formed by the death of layers of coralline algae

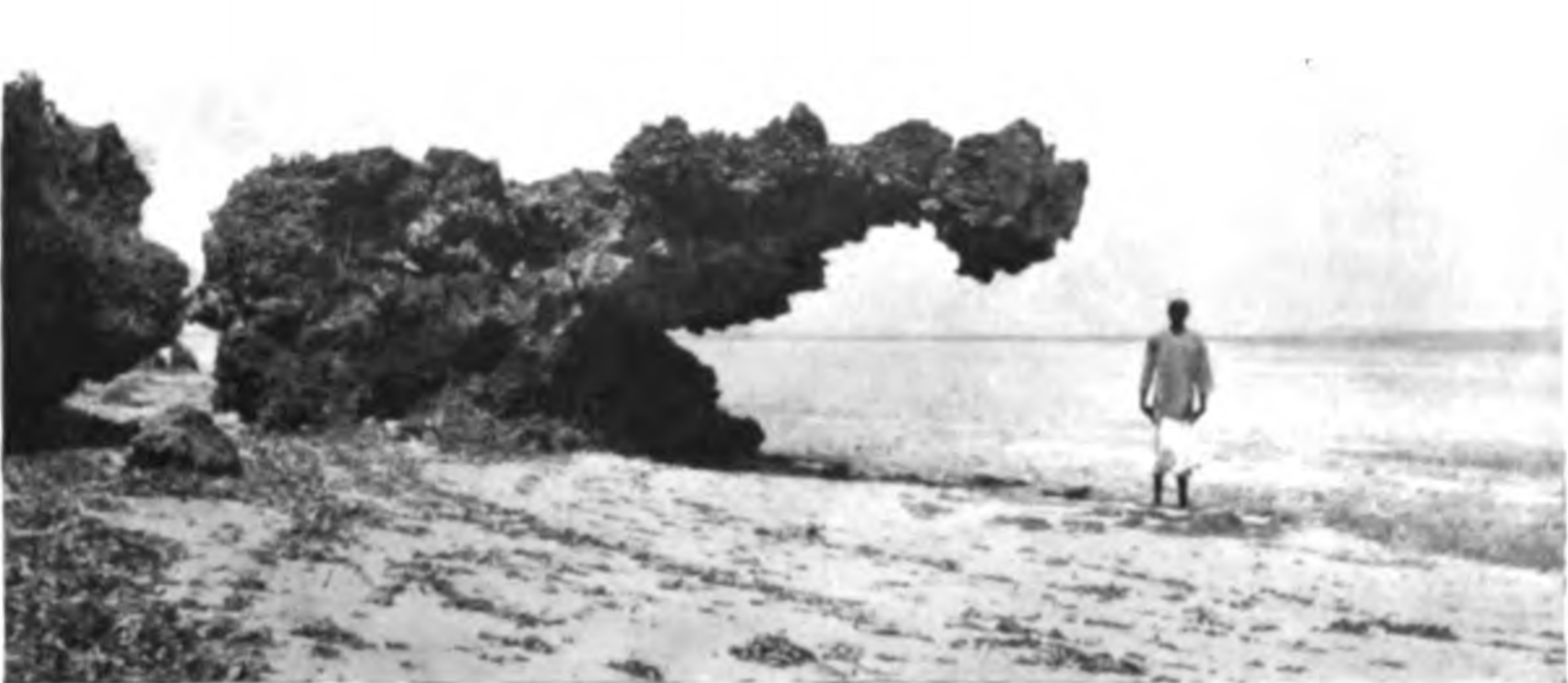
Coralline rocks on the Zanzibar Coast

Coralline rock is a type of rock formed by the death of layers of coralline algae. It is visually quite bright like the algae, and is often desired as aquarium decoration. Since it is formed from the dead algae, it contains some nutrients and calcium carbonate, which has allowed it to be used in some building structures.

== See also ==
- Carbonate rock
