= Sandy Heslop =

British academic (born 1949)

Thomas Alexander "Sandy" Heslop, FSA, FRHS (born August 1949), publishing as T. A. Heslop, is a British academic who specialises in the art and architecture of medieval England. He is Professor of Visual Arts at the University of East Anglia (UEA). He was Slade Professor of Fine Art at the University of Cambridge for the 1997/1998 academic year.

Heslop read for a BA in the history of art at the Courtauld Institute of Art, which he completed in 1971, and, during that time, he contributed photographs of British churches to the Conway Library whose archive, of primarily architectural images, is in the process of being digitised as part of the wider Courtauld Connects project.

Having joined what was then the School of World Art Studies and Museology (now the School of Art, Media and American Studies) at UEA in 1976 under the deanship of Andrew Martindale, whose obituary Heslop penned in 1995, Professor Heslop lists his overarching interest as being "in making and its place in human culture. Humans use objects of all kinds (natural and manufactured) for practical purposes but also to structure understanding and identities"...and also in "analysing the relationship between people and things, and the role of imagination in the creation and reception of artefacts". In 2011, Sandy Heslop curated the exhibition Basketry: Making Human Nature at the Sainsbury Centre for Visual Arts.

In the 1990s, Heslop was one of a number of researchers who developed the field of castle studies to address how the structures, especially great towers (also referred to as keeps), reflected their patrons' status. Heslop's study of Orford Castle's architecture "place[s] a range of architectural influences within one building and allow[s] it to accommodate both the secular and the sacred". In 2017 Professor Heslop became principal Investigator and leader of the research programme for the project The Medieval Parish Churches of Norwich – City, Community and Architecture funded by the Leverhulme Trust and the Norwich Research Park Translational Fund. He is also working on a study of St Anselm's art patronage at Canterbury, 1093-1109, and related imagery such as the paintings in the Chapter House of Worcester Cathedral.

Professor Heslop was elected a Fellow of the Society of Antiquaries of London in 1982, he is also a Fellow of the Royal Historical Society and, since 2019, has been Vice President of the British Archaeological Association, having been its President in the preceding year.

A festschrift dedicated to Heslop and titled From Miniature to Monumental: Studies in Medieval Art and Architecture was published in 2025 by Brepols.

== Selected works ==
- Norwich : medieval and early modern art, architecture and archaeology, eds. T. A. Heslop and Helen E. Lunnon, Leeds : Published for the British Archaeology Association by Maney Publishing, 2015, ISBN 9781909662773
- Art, Faith and Place in East Anglia : from prehistory to the present, eds. T. A. Heslop, Elizabeth Mellings and Margit Thofner, Woodbridge : Boydell, 2012, ISBN 9781843837442
- Norwich Castle Keep : Romanesque architecture and social context, Norwich : Centre of East Anglian Studies, 1994, ISBN 0906219388
- The Eadwine Psalter: Text, Image, and Monastic Culture in Twelfth-century Canterbury, eds. T. A. Heslop, M. T. Gibson, R. W. Pfaff, London: Modern Humanities Research Association, Pennsylvania State University Press, 1992, ISBN 9780271008370
