= Mona Fitzalan-Howard, 11th Baroness Beaumont =

British peer

The Right Honourable The Baroness Beaumont OBE
- Born: The Hon. Mona Josephine Tempest Stapleton; 1 August 1894; Broughton, Yorkshire
- Died: 31 August 1971 (aged 77)
- Occupation: Peer
- Title: 11th Baroness Beaumont; Baroness Howard of Glossop
- Spouse: Bernard Fitzalan-Howard, 3rd Baron Howard of Glossop (m. 1914)
- Children: Miles Fitzalan-Howard, 17th Duke of Norfolk; Lord Michael Fitzalan-Howard; Lady Mariegold Jamieson; Lord Martin Fitzalan-Howard; Lady Miriam Hubbard; Lady Miranda Emmett; Lady Mirabel Kelly; Lord Mark Fitzalan-Howard
- Relatives: Gabriella Wilde (great-granddaughter)

Mona Josephine Tempest Fitzalan-Howard, 11th Baroness Beaumont, Baroness Howard of Glossop, OBE (née Stapleton; 1 August 1894 – 31 August 1971) was a British peer and member of the Howard and Tempest families. She inherited the Barony of Beaumont before her second birthday, following her father's death in a tragic accident.

== Early life ==
Beaumont was born in 1894, the first child of Miles Stapleton, 10th Baron Beaumont, and his wife, Ethel Mary (née Tempest), who had married the previous year. Beaumont was born at Broughton Hall, the seat of her maternal grandfather, Sir Charles Henry Tempest, 1st Baronet, who died the day before she was born.

A few months before her first birthday, the Beaumonts settled at the Stapletons' ancestral home of Carlton Towers in Selby, Yorkshire. Her family was Roman Catholic; both the Howards and Stapletons were notable recusant families. Her mother endowed a Catholic day school in Selby, Yorkshire.

== Barony of Beaumont ==
On 16 September 1895, Lord Beaumont accidentally shot and killed himself at the Carlton Towers estate. He had been hunting alone with his dog and was climbing over a gate with his double-barrel shotgun in one hand when his gun discharged point blank through his face, killing him instantly. Her mother, who was expecting a second child, was reportedly in such a state of shock that she refused to believe her husband was dead: "At first she was simply told that he had met with an accident while out shooting, but later in the day her maid informed her of Lord Beaumont's death, which she absolutely refused to credit."

Her mother gave birth to another girl, Ivy Mary, weeks later. The birth of a male would have led to a direct continuation of the Barony of Beaumont. This led to confusion as it was initially believed that the barony, first created in 1309 by writ, was extinct.

At the time of the 10th baron's death, the Beaumont barony was one of 17 feudal baronies in existence that originated with a special writ of summons from the Crown, summoning the recipient to sit in Parliament. It is disputed exactly when baronies created by writ (also known as baronies in fee, or by tenure, which could be inherited by women) were intended to become hereditary peerages; some authorities believed 1295, though a 1826 committee chaired by Lord Redesdale determined 1382 to be the year, but experts dissented, arguing that the evidence from 1382 was merely a reference to an already established practise.

It was determined that the original barony by writ was indeed hereditary and thus had fallen in abeyance between the two sisters. The barony was called out of abeyance in Mona's favour on 1 June 1896, when Queen Victoria created a hereditary barony through letters patent, in remainder to her heirs of the body lawfully begotten.

== Marriage and issue ==
On 5 September 1914 at St Mary's Church, Carlton, Yorkshire, she married the 3rd Baron Howard of Glossop (thus also becoming Baroness Howard of Glossop). She and her husband were one of the few couples to both hold titles in their own right. They had eight children, of whom the eldest son and first-born child became 17th Duke of Norfolk in 1975, uniting the Beaumont barony with the Norfolk titles. His brothers and sisters were all granted the rank, style and precedence of children of a duke (as if their father had lived to succeed as duke himself):

- Miles Stapleton-Fitzalan-Howard, 17th Duke of Norfolk (1915–2002); had issue including the current Duke of Norfolk
- Lord Michael Fitzalan-Howard (1916–2007); had issue
- Lady Mariegold Magdalane Fitzalan-Howard (1919–2006), married Gerald James "Jerrie" Jamieson, Esq. (son of Sir Archibald Jamieson) and had issue
- Lord Martin Fitzalan-Howard (1922–2003), married Bridget Anne Keppel and had issue
- Lady Miriam Fitzalan-Howard (1924–1996), married Lt-Cdr Peregrine Hubbard and had issue. Their granddaughter is actress Gabriella Wilde. Lady Miriam founded Moreton Hall prep school in 1962.
- Lady Miranda Fitzalan-Howard (1927-2018), married the Hon. Christopher Emmett (son of the Baroness Emmet of Amberley).
- Lady Mirabel Fitzalan-Howard (1931–2008), married Bernard Noel David George Terrence Kelly (son of diplomat Sir David Victor Kelly) and had issue.
- Lord Mark Fitzalan-Howard (born 1934), married Jacynth Lindsay, daughter of Sir Martin Lindsay, 1st Baronet, has two daughters.

In the 1946 New Year Honours, Lady Beaumont was appointed OBE for her services during World War II to the British Red Cross at York Military Hospital, Goole.

Due to a spinal injury, in later life she used a wheelchair. After the passage of the Peerage Act 1963, Beaumont became the third peeress in her own right to take her seat in the House of Lords; her husband pushed her wheelchair when she took her seat. She never spoke in the House of Lords. On her death in 1971 at the age of 77, her title passed to her eldest son, Miles, who inherited the dukedom of Norfolk from his father's cousin in 1975 and added his mother's maiden name to his own.

Her great-granddaughter is actress Gabriella Wilde.

Peerage of England
Preceded by Miles Stapleton (abeyant 1895)	Baroness Beaumont; 1896–1971 (abeyancy terminated)	Succeeded by Miles Fitzalan-Howard
