= Ernest Auldjo Jamieson =

Scottish architect (1880–1937)

Ernest Arthur Oliphant Auldjo Jamieson FRIBA MID (3 December 1880 – 10 April 1937) was a Scottish architect operating in the early 20th century. He specialised in country houses, largely for wealthy family friends. From after the First World War he also got many commissions from local authorities for social housing, plus several commissions related to hospitals and asylums.

== Early life and education ==
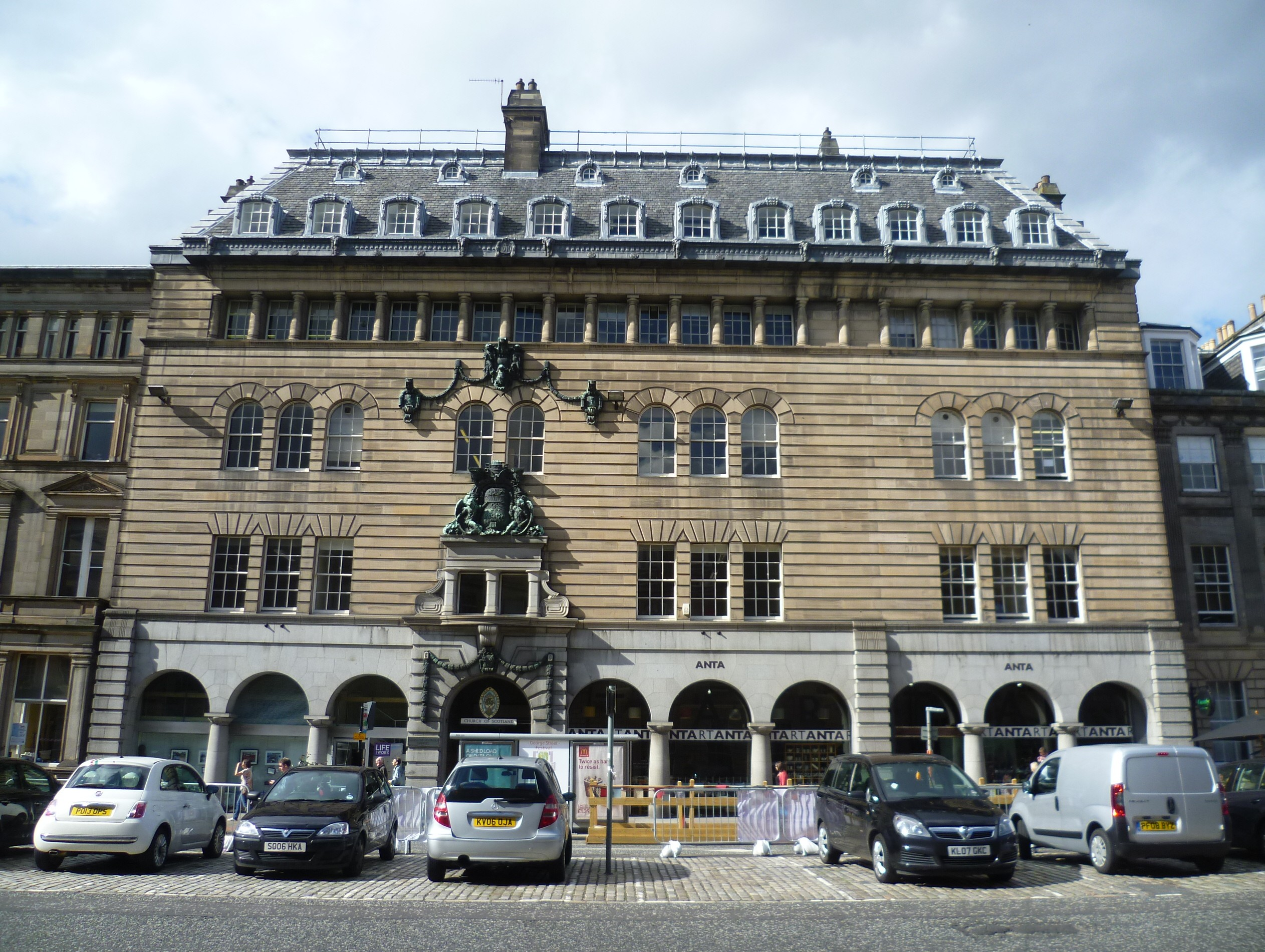
Church of Scotland Offices, Edinburgh

Jamieson was born in 1880 at 58 Melville Street in Edinburgh's west end, the fifth son (out of eight children) to George Auldjo Jamieson, a wealthy accountant, and his wife, Susan Oliphant. Sir Archibald Jamieson was his younger brother; his nephew was David Auldjo Jamieson, who was awarded the VC in 1944 during the Second World War.

He was sent to boarding school at Glenalmond College then won a place at Cambridge University. He graduated BA in 1903.

== Career ==
In 1906, Jamieson became an architectural assistant in the office of Sydney Mitchell at 13 Young Street. When Mitchell retired in 1909 Jamieson bought the practice and moved it to 1 Melville Street. In 1912 his family moved to 14 Royal Circus in the New Town.

In the First World War he joined the Royal Naval Air Service as a lieutenant. He was promoted rapidly, becoming a flight commander in 1917. He ended the war as a lieutenant colonel in the Army Flying Corps. He was twice Mentioned in Dispatches.

After the war he went into partnership with James Alexander Arnott to form Auldjo Jamieson & Arnott.

He retired due to ill-health in 1935 and died at Grey House in Murrayfield in 1937 aged only 56. He is buried in the 20th century northern extension to Dean Cemetery. The grave lies on the north wall near the north-west corner.

== Main works ==
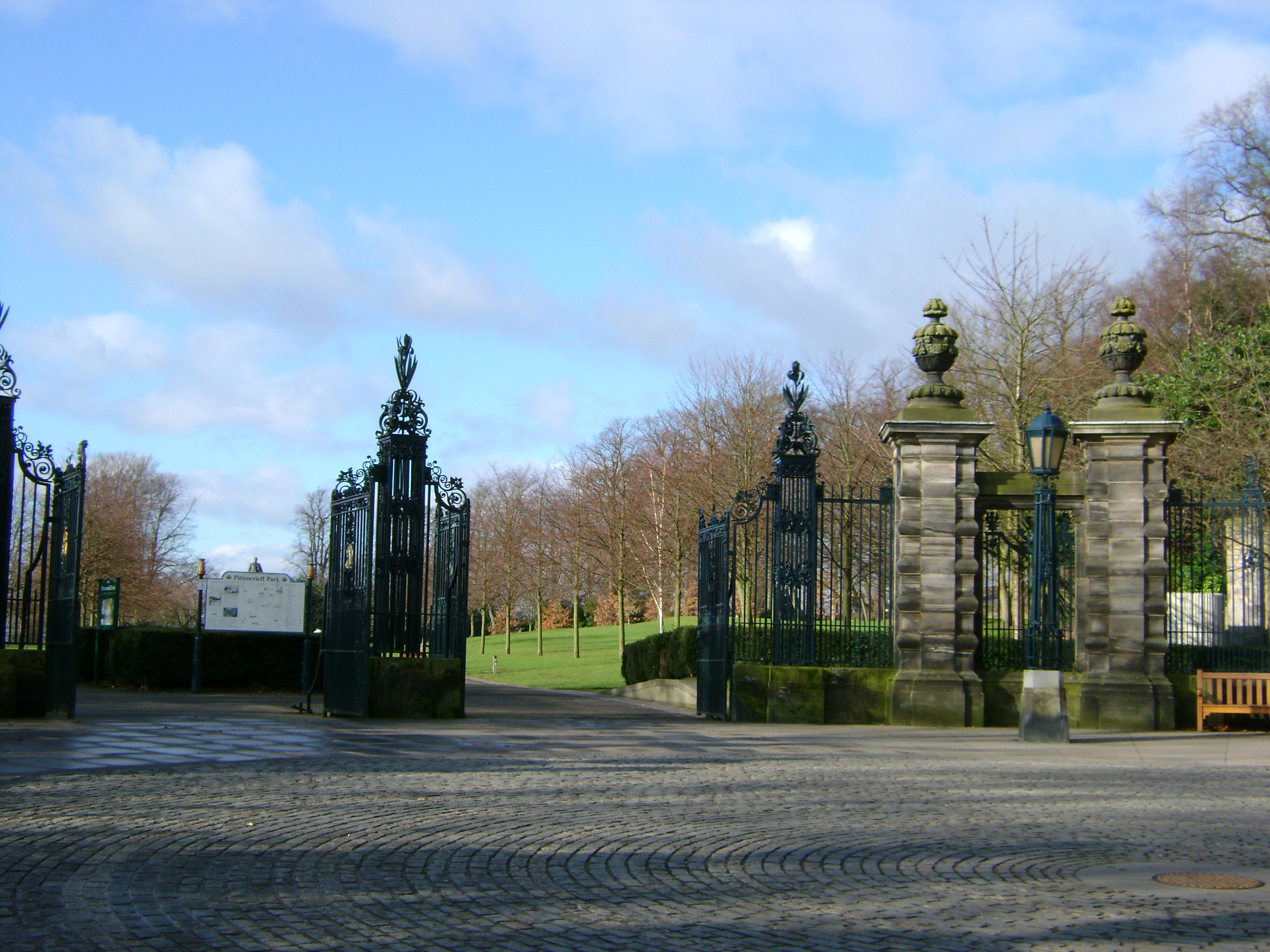
The memorial gates at Pittencrieff Park

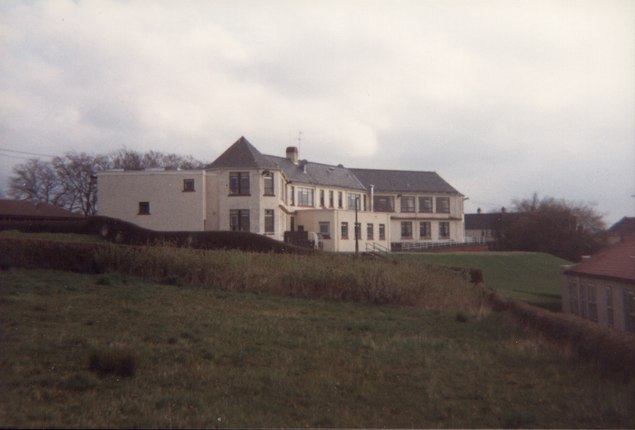
Hairmyres Hospital Tuberculosis Ward

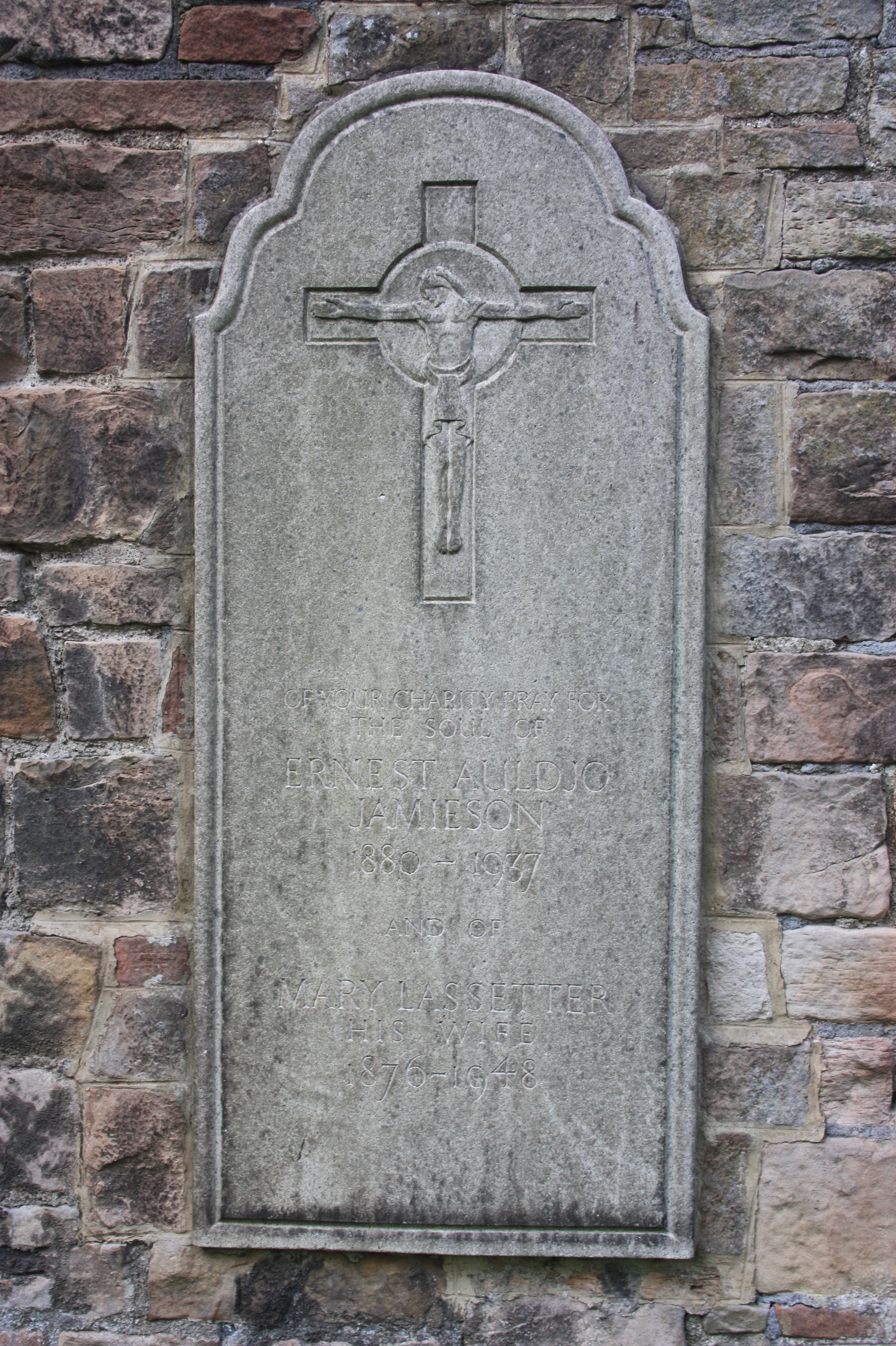
The grave of Ernest Auldjo Jamieson, Dean Cemetery, Edinburgh

- Remodelling of St Cuthbert’s Parish Church, Colinton, Edinburgh (1906)
- Extensions to Craig House, Edinburgh (1906 to 1914) under Mitchell to 1909.
- Church of Scotland Offices, George Street, Edinburgh (1909)
- Woodthorpe House, Edinburgh (1910)
- Convalescent Home, Gullane, East Lothian (1910)
- Commercial Bank, Dalkeith (1911)
- Male and female observation wards at Crichton Royal Institution, Dumfries (1911)
- Improvements at Lennoxlove House (1911 and 1933)
- Redcroft, villa in Murrayfield, Edinburgh (1911)
- Murrayfield Golf Clubhouse (1912)
- Royal Victoria Hospital farm colony, Polton, Midlothian (1912–1914)
- Greenfield House, Alloa (1914)
- Hairmyres Hospital, Tuberculosis Ward and other buildings (1914)
- Rosebery House, Midlothian (1914–15)
- Expansion and alterations to Grey House, Murrayfield (1919)
- Council Housing, Stow (1919)
- Council housing, Inveresk (1920)
- Council housing, Roslin, Midlothian (1920)
- Royal Hospital for Sick Children, Sciennes, Edinburgh remodelling (1920)
- Memorial Hall, Cargilfield Preparatory School (1921)
- Council housing, Gorebridge (1921)
- Cardross House, Perthshire (1922)
- Conversion of Royal Naval airship station into a hospital, East Fortune (1922)
- Children’s Wing, Southfield Hospital, Liberton, Edinburgh (1922)
- Library and chapel, Cargilfield Preparatory School (1923)
- New wards and nurses home, Astley Ainslie Hospital (1925)
- New wards, Lochgilphead Asylum (1925)
- Gates and lodges Busby Glen Park, Busby, East Renfrewshire (1925)
- Conversion of Vogrie House into a nursing home (1926)
- Louise Carnegie Memorial Gates and remodelling entire park, Pittencrieff Park, Dunfermline (1928)
- Science Block, Astley Ainslie Hospital (1929)
- Cricket Pavilion, Cargilfield Preparatory School (1929)
- An unbuilt monument to Sydney Mitchell in Warriston Cemetery who instead was buried in the grave of his father, Sir Arthur Mitchell in Rosebank Cemetery (1930)
- West and north lodges at Astley Ainslie Hospital (1932)
- Church Hall Davidson's Mains (1933)
- Jordanburn Lecture Hall, Morningside Asylum (1934)

== Family ==
In 1904 he married Mary Leslie Lassetter. Their son George Lindsay Auldjo Jamieson was also an architect.
