= Bernard Fitzalan-Howard =

Bernard Fitzalan-Howard may refer to:

- Bernard Fitzalan-Howard, 12th Duke of Norfolk (1765–1842)
- Bernard Fitzalan-Howard, 3rd Baron Howard of Glossop (1885–1972)
- Bernard Fitzalan-Howard, 16th Duke of Norfolk (1908–1975)
