= Coldstream (ship) =

Several vessels have been named Coldstream for Coldstream:

- Coldstream (1788 ship), was launched at Shields. She first appeared under the Coldstream name in Lloyd's Register in 1800; her earlier history is currently obscure. Between 1801 and 1805 she made two voyages to the Southern Whale Fishery. A French privateer captured her in 1805 during the second.
- Coldstream Packet (1794 ship), of 87 tons (bm), was launched at Berwick. She foundered in 1822 in the North Sea off Kinnaird Head, Aberdeenshire, while on a voyage from Lerwick, Shetland Islands to Leith, Lothian.
- Coldstream (1810 ship) was launched at Deptford. She was an extra ship for the British East India Company (EIC), making nine voyages as an East Indiaman. After the end of the EIC's maritime activities Coldstream made one more voyage to India and China. She disappeared in 1835 while returning to Britain from China.
- Coldstream (1849 ship), of 756 tons (bm), was built of teak at Moulmein, British Burma. She carried settlers to South America and South Australia before she was condemned in the Congo River 23 August 1885.
