= List of shipwrecks in November 1822 =

The list of shipwrecks in November 1822 includes some ships sunk, foundered, grounded, or otherwise lost during November 1822.

== 1 November ==
List of shipwrecks: 1 November 1822
Ship	State	Description
Elizabeth	United Kingdom	The ship was driven ashore and wrecked near Wallasey, Cheshire with some loss of life.
Ellen	United Kingdom	The ship was driven ashore near Ballinskelly, County Kerry. Her crew were rescued. She was on a voyage from Gibraltar to Cork.
Harmony	United Kingdom	The brig was wrecked in Tramore Bay. Her crew were rescued. She was on a voyage from Miramichi Bay to Dublin.
Macedon	United Kingdom	The ship was driven ashore at Penmon, Anglesey She was on a voyage from Liverpool, Lancashire to Bristol, Gloucestershire.
Mersey	United Kingdom	The ship sank at Beaumaris, Anglesey.
Ranger	United Kingdom	The ship was driven ashore and wrecked in Loch Maddy. She was on a voyage from Saint Petersburg, Russia to Bristol, Gloucestershire.
Starling	United Kingdom	The ship foundered in the Mediterranean Sea 14 nautical miles (26 km) off the entrance to the Dardanelles. Her crew were rescued.

== 2 November ==
List of shipwrecks: 2 November 1822
Ship	State	Description
Betsey	United Kingdom	The sloop foundered in the Firth of Tay with the loss of both crew.
Hope	United Kingdom	The ship was driven ashore and wrecked in Glenluce Bay. She was on a voyage from Bristol, Gloucestershire to Glasgow, Renfrewshire.
Lowland Lass	(United Kingdom of Great Britain and Ireland) Jamaica	The sloop was driven ashore at Lower Plumb Point.
Margaret	United Kingdom	The ship was driven ashore on Mullion Island, County Galway. She was on a voyage from Quebec City, Lower Canada, British North America to Cork.
Royalist	United Kingdom	The ship was driven ashore in Sandyhaven Bay. She was on a voyage from Cardiff, Glamorgan to London.

== 3 November ==
List of shipwrecks: 3 November 1822
Ship	State	Description
Ottawa	United Kingdom	The ship was wrecked on St. Anna's Island, off Maranhão, Brazil. Her crew were rescued. She was on a voyage from Liverpool, Lancashire to Maranhão.
Regent	United Kingdom	The ship was wrecked near Manila, Spanish East Indies with the loss of six of her crew. She was on a voyage from London to a Chinese port.

== 4 November ==
List of shipwrecks: 4 November 1822
Ship	State	Description
Blanch	United Kingdom	The ship ran aground in the River Foyle. She was on a voyage from Liverpool, Lancashire to Donegal Bay.
Ocean	United Kingdom	The ship departed from Leith, Lothian for King's Lynn, Norfolk. No further trace, presumed foundered in the North Sea with the loss of all hands.

== 5 November ==
List of shipwrecks: 5 November 1822
Ship	State	Description
Betsey	France	The ship was driven ashore in the River Plate. She was on a voyage from Bordeaux, Gironde to Buenos Aires, Argentina.
Regen	United Kingdom	The ship ran aground on the Niddings. She was on a voyage from "Wyburg" to King's Lynn, Norfolk. Regent was refloated on 10 November and taken in to Gothenburg, Sweden for repairs.

== 7 November ==
List of shipwrecks: 7 November 1822
Ship	State	Description
Fortuna	Sweden	The ship was lost near Loviisa. She was on a voyage from Cádiz, Spain to Loviisa.

== 8 November ==
List of shipwrecks: 8 November 1822
Ship	State	Description
Dove	United Kingdom	The ship was lost north of Porto, Portugal.

== 9 November ==
List of shipwrecks: 9 November 1822
Ship	State	Description
Betsey	United Kingdom	The collier foundered in the Firth of Tay with the loss of all hands.
Rosehill	United Kingdom	The ship departed from the Clyde for Tortola. No further trace, presumed foundered with the loss of all hands.

== 10 November ==
List of shipwrecks: 10 November 1822
Ship	State	Description
Coldstream or Coldstream Packet	United Kingdom	The ship foundered in the North Sea off Kinnaird Head, Aberdeenshire. She was on a voyage from Lerwick, Shetland Islands to Leith, Lothian.

== 11 November ==
List of shipwrecks: 11 November 1822
Ship	State	Description
Abbey	United Kingdom	The ship capsized in Liverpool Bay with the loss of two of the fifteen people on board. She was on a voyage from Drogheda, County Louth to Liverpool, Lancashire.
Henry	United Kingdom	The ship was driven ashore on Saltholm, Denmark. She was later refloated and taken in to Copenhagen for repairs.
Prince Regent	United Kingdom	The ship foundered off Poorhead, County Cork with the loss of all hands. She was on a voyage from Liverpool to Cork.

== 12 November ==
List of shipwrecks: 12 November 1822
Ship	State	Description
Boreas	Sweden	The ship was driven ashore at Helsingør, Denmark.
Mitchelgrove	United Kingdom	The ship was driven ashore at Littlehampton, Sussex.

== 13 November ==
List of shipwrecks: 13 November 1822
Ship	State	Description
Margaretta	United Kingdom	The ship was driven ashore near Campbeltown, Argyllshire. She was on a voyage from Limerick to Liverpool, Lancashire. Margaretta was refloated in early December.
Regent	United Kingdom	The ship ran aground on the Lapsand. She was on a voyage from Saint Petersburg, Russia to Hull, Yorkshire. Regent was refloated on 16 November and resumed her voyage.

== 14 November ==
List of shipwrecks: 14 November 1822
Ship	State	Description
Aid	United Kingdom	The hovelling boat was in collision with another vessel and foundered in the English Channel off Deal, Kent with the loss of all five crew.
John and Thomas	United Kingdom	The ship was driven ashore at Liverpool, Lancashire. She was on a voyage from Saint John, New Brunswick, British North America to Liverpool, Lancashire. John and Thomas was later refloated and taken in to Liverpool.
Liberty	United Kingdom	The brig capsized at Limerick.
Mary	United Kingdom	The brig foundered in the Irish Sea off the Point of Ayre, Isle of Man. Her crew were rescued by Fullarton (United Kingdom).
Pacific	United Kingdom	The brig capsized and was severely damaged at Limerick.

== 15 November ==
List of shipwrecks: 15 November 1822
Ship	State	Description
Adelphi	United Kingdom	The ship was run down and sunk in the North Sea off North Shields, County Durham with the loss of two of her crew.
Ann Elizabeth	United Kingdom	The ship was wrecked near Nevlunghavn, Norway.
Fame	United Kingdom	The ship was driven ashore and wrecked on Walney Island, Lancashire. She was on a voyage from Liverpool, Lancashire to Sunderland, County Durham.
Farmer Abby	United Kingdom	The ship was driven ashore at the mouth of the River Clare, County Cork.
Industry	United Kingdom	The barque foundered in the North Sea off the mouth of the River Tees. Her crew were rescued. She was on a voyage from South Shields, County Durham to London.
Jeane Marie	France	The ship was driven ashore near Bardouville, Seine-Inférieure. She was on a voyage from Stockton-on-Tees, Yorkshire, United Kingdom to Rouen, Seine-Inférieure. Jean Marie was refloated on 19 November and taken in to Rouen.
Lascelles	United Kingdom	The ship foundered in Liverpool Bay off Southport, Lancashire with the loss of all thirteen crew. She was on a voyage from Maranhão, Brazil to Liverpool, Lancashire.
Olive Branch	United Kingdom	The ship foundered in Pretty Harbour Bay, St. John's, Newfoundland with the loss off four of her nine crew. She was on a voyage from Porto, Portugal to St. John's.
Providence	United Kingdom	The ship foundered in the English Channel off Folkestone, Kent.
Resolution	United Kingdom	The ship was driven ashore at Holyhead, Anglesey. Her crew were rescued. She was later refloated and taken in to Holyhead. Resolution was on a voyage from Liverpool to Waterford.
Sarah	United Kingdom	The ship was sunk by ice off Taganrog, Russia. She was on a voyage from Tenerife, Canary Islands to Taganrog.
Warren	United Kingdom	The ship sprang a leak in the English Channel and was beached 8 nautical miles (15 km) east of Poole, Dorset. She was on a voyage from Flensburg, Duchy of Schleswig to Naples, Kingdom of the Two Sicilies.

== 16 November ==
List of shipwrecks: 16 November 1822
Ship	State	Description
Brunswick	United Kingdom	The ship foundered in Wyre Water with the loss of all hands. She was on a voyage from Smyrna, Ottoman Empire to Liverpool, Lancashire.
Ceres	United Kingdom	The ship was lost in Liverpool Bay. Her crew were rescued. She was on a voyage from Waterford to Liverpool.
Jeune Jeanne	France	The ship was wrecked near Les Sables d'Olonne, Vendée. Her crew were rescued. She was on a voyage from Bordeaux, Gironde to Hamburg.
Maria	Denmark	The ship was driven ashore and wrecked at Poole, Dorset, United Kingdom. She was on a voyage from Flensburg to Naples, Kingdom of the Two Sicilies.
Prince Regent	United Kingdom	The ship foundered off Poor Head, County Cork with the loss of all seven people on board. She was on a voyage from Liverpool to Cork.
Witherby	United Kingdom	The ship was wrecked on the Haisborough Sands, in the North Sea off the coast of Norfolk. Her crew were rescued by the fishing smack Four Brothers (United Kingdom). Witherby was on a voyage from Selby, Yorkshire to London.

== 17 November ==
List of shipwrecks: 17 November 1822
Ship	State	Description
Alexander	Prussia	The ship was driven onto the "North Grounds" and sank. She was on a voyage from Amsterdam, North Holland, Netherlands to Pillau.
Jane	United Kingdom	The ship was lost on Baltrum, Kingdom of Hanover. She was on a voyage from Hull, Yorkshire to Amsterdam.
Nearchus	United Kingdom	The ship sprang a leak and was abandoned in the Atlantic Ocean with the loss of a crew member. She was on a voyage from Miramichi Bay to Grangemouth, Stirlingshire.

== 19 November ==
List of shipwrecks: 19 November 1822
Ship	State	Description
USS Alligator	United States Navy	The schooner ran aground on a reef off the coast of the Florida Territory. Salvage efforts were abandoned on 23 November and the ship was set afire.
Britannia	United Kingdom	The ship was wrecked on Sugar Key. Her crew were rescued. She was on a voyage from Port-au-Prince, Haiti to Wilmington, Delaware.
Catherine	United Kingdom	The ship was wrecked in Clew Bay.
Freden	Sweden	The ship was driven ashore and wrecked at Lerwick, Shetland Islands, United Kingdom. Her crew were rescued. She was on a voyage from Boston, Massachusetts, United States to Gothenburg.
Larch	United States	The ship was wrecked at New York. Her crew were rescued. She was on a voyage from Barbados to New York.
Queen Charlotte	United Kingdom	The ship foundered in the North Sea off Newbiggin-by-the-Sea, Northumberland. Her crew were rescued by Friendship (United Kingdom). Queen Charlotte was on a voyage from Limerick to Hull, Yorkshire.
Saltom	United Kingdom	The ship was driven ashore and damaged near Beckfoot, Cumberland. She was on a voyage from Miramichi, New Brunswick, British North America to Carlisle, Cumberland. Saltom was later refloated and taken in to Carlisle.

== 20 November ==
List of shipwrecks: 20 November 1822
Ship	State	Description
Bellona	United Kingdom	The ship was abandoned in the Irish Sea off the Tuskar Rock with the loss of two of her crew. Survivors were rescued by Maria (United Kingdom). Bellona was on a voyage from Miramichi Bay to Glasgow, Renfrewshire. She subsequently came ashore in Bewdley Bay, County Wexford. She was refloated on 28 December and taken in to Wexford.
Potomac	United States	The ship struck a rock in the River Plate and was wrecked. She was on a voyage from Buenos Aires, Argentina to Colonia, New Jersey.
Vigilantie	Kingdom of Hanover	The ship was abandoned in the North Sea. Her crew were rescued by Jane (United Kingdom). Vigilantie was on a voyage from Norway to Bremen.

== 22 November ==
List of shipwrecks: 22 November 1822
Ship	State	Description
Four Brothers	United Kingdom	The ship was wrecked on the Cross Sand, in the North Sea off Great Yarmouth, Norfolk. All nine people on board survived. She was on a voyage from Rotterdam, South Holland, Netherlands to London.
Four Brothers	United Kingdom	The smack foundered in the English Channel off The Needles, Isle of Wight. Her crew were rescued. She was on a voyage from Swanage, Dorset to Cowes, Isle of Wight.
Janus	Bremen	The ship was wrecked on Cape Henry, Virginia, United States. Her crew were rescued. She was on a voyage from Philadelphia, Pennsylvania to Baltimore, Maryland.
Lively	United Kingdom	The ship was driven ashore at "Castle Mona". Her crew were rescued.
Mary	United Kingdom	The ship was driven ashore at Nethertown, Cumberland. She was on a voyage from Dublin to Whitehaven, Cumberland.
Mary	United Kingdom	The ship was driven ashore and damaged at Scotstoun Head. She was on a voyage from Saint Petersburg, Russia to Grangemouth, Stirlingshire. Mary was later refloated and taken in to Peterhead, Aberdeenshire.
Wellington	United Kingdom	The smack foundered in the English Channel off The Needles, Isle of Wight. Her crew were rescued.

== 23 November ==
List of shipwrecks: 23 November 1822
Ship	State	Description
Briton	United Kingdom	The ship was driven on to the North Bull, in the Irish Sea off County Dublin.
Dorothy	United Kingdom	The ship struck the quayside at Liverpool, Lancashire and sank.
Mary	United Kingdom	The ship was driven ashore and wrecked south of St. Bees Head, Cumberland. Her crew were rescued. She was on a voyage from Skerries, County Dublin to Whitehaven, Cumberland.
St. Charles	United Kingdom	The ship was driven ashore on Green Island. Her crew were rescued. She was on a voyage from Quebec City, Lower Canada, British North America to Greenock, Renfrewshire. St. Charles was refloated in March 1823 and taken in to Quebec City in a waterlogged condition.
Waterloo	United Kingdom	The ship ran aground on Tortugas Shoals. The Columbian armed ship Centinella got her off and took her into Savannah.

== 24 November ==
List of shipwrecks: 24 November 1822
Ship	State	Description
Cicero	United Kingdom	The ship was wrecked on the Haisborough Sands, in the North Sea off the coast of Norfolk. Her crew were rescued. She was on a voyage from London to Newcastle-upon-Tyne, Northumberland.
Mary	United Kingdom	The ship was driven ashore and wrecked south of St Bees Head, Cumberland. Her crew were rescued. She was on a voyage from Skerries, County Dublin to Whitehaven, Cumberland.
Mary Ann	United Kingdom	The ship was wreckedin the Atlantic Ocean with the loss of two of her fourteen crew. The survivors were rescued on 27 November by Lester (United Kingdom) She was on a voyage from Quebec City, Lower Canada, British North America to London.

== 25 November ==
List of shipwrecks: 25 November 1822
Ship	State	Description
Caroline	United States	The brig was wrecked on Anegada, Virgin Islands. She was on a voyage from Boston, Massachusetts to Puerto Rico.
Duke of Wellington	United Kingdom	The ship was driven ashore at Newry, County Antrim. She was on a voyage from Saint Petersburg, Russia to Bristol, Gloucestershire. Duke of Wellington was refloated in early December and taken in to Warrenpoint, County Antrim.
Fanny	Netherlands	The ship was driven ashore near Audierne, Finistère, France. She was on a voyage from Bordeaux, Gironde, France to Amsterdam, North Holland.
Limerick Trader	United Kingdom	The ship was lost near Goree, South Holland, Netherlands. Her crew were rescued. She was on a voyage from Bristol, Gloucestershire to Rotterdam, South Holland.
Vigilante	Kingdom of Hanover	The galiot sprang a leak in the North Sea and was abandoned. Her crew were rescued by Jane (United Kingdom).

== 26 November ==
List of shipwrecks: 26 November 1822
Ship	State	Description
Alfred and Mary	United Kingdom	The sloop was driven ashore in Whitsand Bay. She was on a voyage from Falmouth, Cornwall to Plymouth, Devon.
De Jonge Nicholaas	Netherlands	The ship was driven ashore and wrecked at Seaford, Sussex, United Kingdom. Her crew were rescued. She was on a voyage from Sète, Hérault, France to Amsterdam, North Holland.
Friends	United Kingdom	The ship was lost near Aldeburgh, Suffolk. Her crew were rescued. She was on a voyage from Sunderland, County Durham to London.

== 27 November ==
List of shipwrecks: 27 November 1822
Ship	State	Description
Farmer	United Kingdom	The ship departed from Aberdeen for London. No further trace, presumed foundered in the North Sea with the loss of all hands.
Fountain	(United Kingdom of Great Britain and Ireland) British North America	The ship was wrecked on the coast of Puerto Rico. She was on a voyage from Trinidad to Boston, Massachusetts, United States.
John and Sarah	United Kingdom	The ship departed from Quebec City, Lower Canada, British North America for Liverpool, Lancashire. No further trace, presumed foundered with the loss of all hands.
Maria Elizabeth	Denmark	The ship was lost near "Eastrice". She was on a voyage from Porto, Portugal to a Danish port.
Mary Ann	United Kingdom	The ship was abandoned in the Atlantic Ocean. She was on a voyage from Quebec City to London. The wreck came ashore at Ouessant, Finistère, France on 12 April 1823.
Nearchus	United Kingdom	The ship was driven ashore crewless at "North Ferroe". She was on a voyage from Miramichi, New Brunswick, British North America to Grangemouth, Stirlingshire.
Virginia	Bremen	The ship was beached at St. Ubes, Portugal. She was on a voyage from Bremen to St. Ubes.

== 28 November ==
List of shipwrecks: 29 November 1822
Ship	State	Description
Caroline	United States	The ship was wrecked on Angada, Virgin Islands. She was on a voyage from Boston, Massachusetts to Puerto Rico.

== 29 November ==
List of shipwrecks: 29 November 1822
Ship	State	Description
Cæsar	France	The schooner was wrecked at Havre de Grâce, Seine-Inférieure. She was on a voyage from Saint-Malo, Ille-et-Vilaine to Rouen, Seine-Inférieure.
Galen	United States	The ship was wrecked on the Haaks Sandbank, in the North Sea off the Dutch coast with the loss of all but two of her crew. She was on a voyage from Portland, Oregon to Amsterdam, North Holland, Netherlands.
Hope	United Kingdom	The sloop foundered in the English Channel off Poole, Dorset with the loss of all hands, She was on a voyage from Swanage, Dorset to Cowes, Isle of Wight.

== 30 November ==
List of shipwrecks: 30 November 1822
Ship	State	Description
Eliza	United Kingdom	The ship struck the pier at Dover, Kent and sank.
Eliza	United States	The ship foundered off Bonaire, Lesser Antilles. She was on a voyage from New York to Curaçao.
Fanny	France	The ship was lost at the mouth of the Gironde. She was on a voyage from Bordeaux, Gironde to a Dutch port.
Hannah	United Kingdom	The ship was wrecked on Devils Island, Nova Scotia, British North America. She was on a voyage from Liverpool, Lancashire to Halifax, Nova Scotia. Hannah was later refloated with the assistance of HMS Athol and HMS Jaseur (both Royal Navy) and taken in to Halifax.
Integrity	United Kingdom	The ship was lost at the mouth of the Pará River. Her crew were rescued.
Swift	United Kingdom	The ship was wrecked at Dungarvan, County Waterford. Her crew were rescued. She was on a voyage from São Miguel, Azores, Portugal to Bristol, Gloucestershire.
William and Ann	United Kingdom	The sloop sprang a leak and was abandoned off Cape Finisterre, Spain. Her crew survived. She was on a voyage from Málaga, Spain to London.

== Unknown date ==
List of shipwrecks: Unknown date in November 1822
Ship	State	Description
Androvech	Austrian Empire	The ship was lost in the Black Sea.
Anna Catherina	Danzig	The ship ran aground off Bornholm, Denmark. She was on a voyage from Rouen, Seine-Inférieure, France to Danzig.
Aureliano	Austrian Empire	The brig was lost in the Black Sea.
Bys	Austrian Empire	The ship was lost in the Black Sea.
Columbo	Netherlands	The ship foundered off "Point Natal", Africa. Her crew survived.
Costanza	Malta	The brig was lost in the Black Sea.
Count Langeberon	Austrian Empire	The brig was lost in the Black Sea.
Darius	Ottoman Empire	The ship was wrecked at the mouth of the Danube. Her crew were rescued. She was on a voyage from Constantinople to Odesa.
David	United Kingdom	The ship was wrecked at sea before 10 November and was abandoned by her crew.
Delphin	Russia	The ship was lost near "Wyburg".
Doveworth	United Kingdom	The ship was lost north of Porto, Portugal.
George	United Kingdom	The ship was presumed to have foundered whilst on a voyage from Waterford to Londonderry.
Jio Genie	Austrian Empire	The brig was lost in the Black Sea.
Louis	France	The ship was driven ashore on Bornholm, Denmark. She was on a voyage from St. Petersburg, Russia to Rouen, Seine-Inférieure.
Margaret	United Kingdom	The ship was driven ashore at Campbeltown, Argyllshire.
Nancy	United Kingdom	The ship was lost near Hiiumaa, Russia. She was on a voyage from Stettin, to Memel, Prussia.
Pallas	Austrian Empire	The full-rigged ship was lost in the Black Sea.
Princess of Wales	United Kingdom	The ship foundered off the coast of Yorkshire.
San Nicolo	Russia	The brig was lost in the Black Sea.
Stella	Austrian Empire	The full-rigged ship was lost in the Black Sea.
Ulysses	Unknown	The ship was wrecked on the coast of Jutland.
Weltevreden	Hamburg	The ship foundered near "Bomelhuk". Her crew were rescued. She was on a voyage from Hamburg to New Jersey, United States.
