= St Margaret's Church, Burnham Norton =

Church in Burnham Norton, Norfolk, England

Coordinates: 52.950824°N 0.729987°E

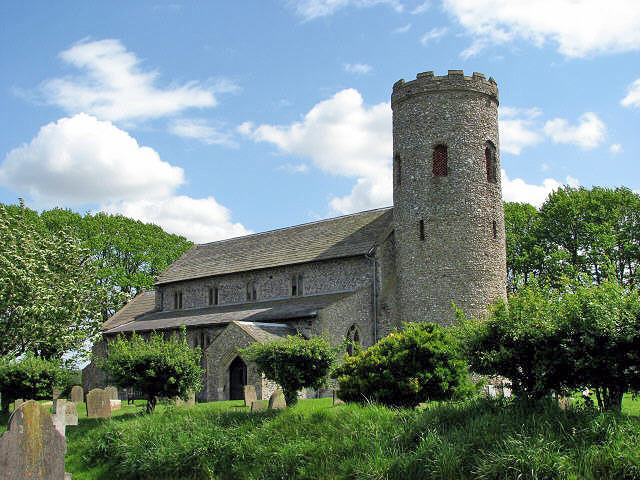
St Margaret's Church

St Margaret's Church is a round-tower church in Burnham Norton, Norfolk, England. Likely to have been built in the 11th century, the building retains many medieval architectural features, and is Grade I listed. It also retains an elaborately decorated 15th-century pulpit, considered one of the finest surviving examples of its type.

== Architecture ==
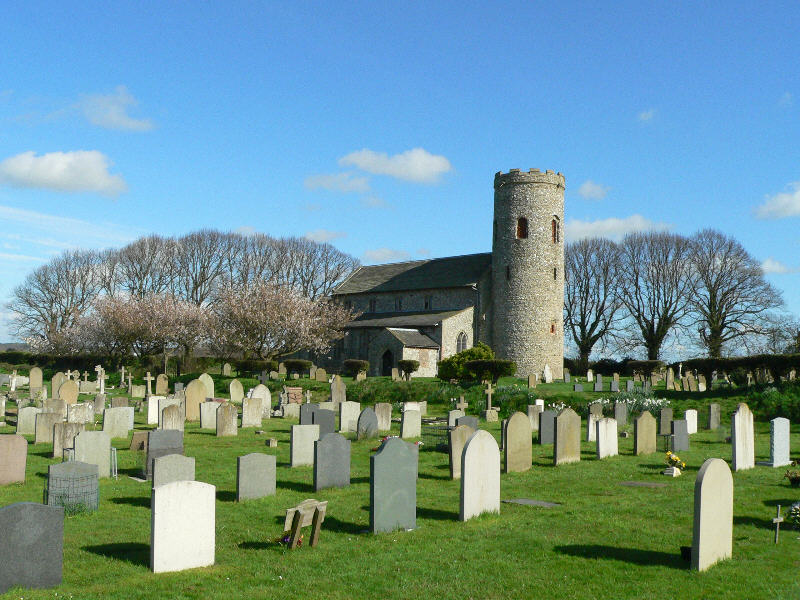
The extensive churchyard of St Margaret's

The village of Burnham Norton is one of the Norfolk Burnhams, a group of villages in Norfolk, England. Approximately 6 miles (10 km) west of Wells-next-the-Sea, it is separated from the sea by tidal marshes.

Burnham Norton's parish church, St Margaret's, is one of 129 surviving round-tower churches in Norfolk. Opinion differs as to its date of construction. Most historians conclude that the tower and at least part of the main building is Anglo-Saxon in origin, built between 1000 and 1066 AD. However, no church is listed in Burnham Norton in 1086's Domesday Book, leading some historians to believe that the building is of early Norman construction. The building was gradually altered in later years, and is not internally symmetrical. The north arcade is supported by 13th-century round columns, while the south arcade is supported by more elaborate 14th-century octagonal columns. The east window of the church is an ornate stained-glass window installed in the late 1920s, depicting saints Margaret of Antioch and Margaret of Scotland. The church building is Grade I listed, the highest level of recognition available to a historical building in England.

== Internal elements ==
Internally, the church retains many of its medieval architectural elements, including an unusually large stone font. A recess near the north door was once the wafer oven used to bake communion wafers. St Margaret's also retains its rood screen, donated in 1458 by William and Johanne Groom; the screen's panels originally depicted images of saints and the Grooms, but these images were defaced during the Reformation.

St Margaret's has two pulpits. One is in regular use, and was built in the 19th century to a plain design, using early 17th-century paneling from the church. The other is no longer in use, and was gifted to the church by John and Catharine Goldale in 1450. (Note: Little is recorded about the Goldales. Records show that shortly before the donation of the pulpit, John Goldale was prosecuted for stealing oysters.) The latter is considered one of the finest surviving examples of its style. A "wine glass" shape, a hexagon tapering at the base to a narrow point, it is heavily decorated; its six panels depict the Goldales, Pope Gregory I, Augustine of Canterbury, Saint Ambrose and Saint Jerome.

== Burials ==
- David Jamieson VC is buried in the churchyard
- Lady Margaret Douglas-Home (great aunt of Diana, Princess of Wales)
- Richard Woodget, master of the Cutty Sark
