= Lord Michael Fitzalan-Howard =

British Army general (1916–2007)

Major-General Lord Michael Fitzalan-Howard GCVO CB CBE MC DL
- Fitzalan-Howard, c. 1970s
- Born: The Hon. Michael Fitzalan-Howard; 22 October 1916; Belgravia, London, England
- Died: 2 November 2007 (aged 91)
- Spouses: Jean Hamilton-Dalrymple (m. 1946; died 1947) Jane Meade-Newman (m. 1950; died 1995) Victoria Baring (m. 1997)
- Children: 6
- Relatives: Bernard Fitzalan-Howard, 3rd Baron Howard of Glossop (father); Mona Fitzalan-Howard, 11th Baroness Beaumont (mother); Miles Fitzalan-Howard, 17th Duke of Norfolk (brother)
- Military career
- Allegiance: United Kingdom
- Branch: British Army
- Service years: 1939–1972
- Rank: Major-General
- Service number: 71887
- Unit: Scots Guards
- Commands: London District; 4th Guards Brigade; 2nd Battalion Scots Guards
- Conflicts: Second World War
- Awards: Knight Grand Cross of the Royal Victorian Order; Companion of the Order of the Bath; Commander of the Order of the British Empire; Military Cross; Mentioned in dispatches

Major-General Lord Michael Fitzalan-Howard, GCVO, CB, CBE, MC, DL (22 October 1916 – 2 November 2007), styled The Honourable Michael Fitzalan-Howard until 1975, was a senior officer in the British Army and a member of the Howard family. He was awarded the Military Cross for his service in Operation Bluecoat in the Second World War.

He served as Marshal of the Diplomatic Corps in the British Royal Household from 1972–81, and Gold Stick-in-Waiting and Colonel of The Life Guards from 1979 until his retirement in 1999.

== Early life and education ==
Fitzalan-Howard was born at 5 Eaton Gate, Belgravia, the second son of Bernard Fitzalan-Howard, 3rd Baron Howard of Glossop and Mona Fitzalan-Howard, 11th Baroness Beaumont (née Stapleton), both of whom held baronies in their own right. He was 15 months younger than his eldest sibling, Miles (who in 1975 succeeded as 17th Duke of Norfolk). He had two other brothers and four sisters, all with first names beginning with the letter M: Martin, Mark, Mariegold, Miriam, Miranda, and Mirabel. He grew up at his mother's family seat, Carlton Towers in North Yorkshire.

Michael and Miles followed parallel courses in their education and career. Both were educated at Ampleforth College, before Oxford and Cambridge – Michael at Trinity College, Cambridge from 1935 to 1938, and Miles at Christ Church, Oxford. Both then took a commission in the British Army – Michael in the Scots Guards in 1938 and Miles in the Grenadier Guards. Michael joined the 3rd Battalion of the Scots Guards when it was formed in April 1944.

== Army career ==
As majors, the brothers both fought in tanks in the Guards Armoured Division in the Second World War, fighting in the breakout from Caen after D-Day: Michael commanded a squadron of the 3rd Scots Guards, while Miles was brigade major of 5th Guards Armoured Brigade. A third brother, Martin, commanded a tank in the 2nd Grenadier Guards. Michael and Miles both won the Military Cross (MC) in 1944. Michael's MC was awarded for leading several attacks in the bocage near Estry and Chênedollé. He then became brigade major of the 32nd Guards Brigade, beating his brother in the race to Brussels. Their brigades then leapfrogged each other on the advance through Eindhoven to the Rhine and the Elbe. Michael was mentioned in dispatches.

Michael and Miles, both career officers, remained in the army after the war. Michael was best man at Miles' wedding in 1949. Both were promoted to colonel in 1958, and then to brigadier in 1961. Miles became a major general in 1963, three months before his brother.

Fitzalan-Howard served as brigade major with the 1st Guards Brigade in Palestine, and then as an instructor at the Staff Colleges in Haifa in 1946 and at Camberley immediately afterwards. He served as brigade major of the 2nd Guards Brigade in Malaya and in London, and was appointed a Member of the Order of the British Empire in 1949. He was appointed a Member of the Royal Victorian Order in 1953 after working on the funeral of King George VI. He served as second-in-command of the 1st Scots Guards in Suez, then commanded the 2nd Scots Guards in 4th Guards Brigade of the British Army of the Rhine. He promoted to brigadier and became chief of staff, London District, in 1958. He returned to Germany to command the 4th Guards Brigade, and was advanced to Commander of the Order of the British Empire in 1962.

He was promoted to major-general in 1964 and became the first commander of the ground forces in Allied Command Europe Mobile Force, a tri-service unit combining forces from several members of NATO. He was then Chief of Staff of Southern Command, based in Salisbury. He was appointed a Companion of the Order of the Bath in 1968, and was Major-General commanding the Household Division and General Officer Commanding London District from 1968 to 1971. He was also colonel of the Lancashire Regiment from 1966 to 1970, and then colonel of the Queen's Lancashire Regiment until 1978, and honorary colonel of Cambridge University OTC from 1968 to 1971. He retired from the army in 1971, and was advanced to Knight Commander of the Royal Victorian Order.

== Later life ==
After retiring from the army, Fitzalan-Howard served as Marshal of the Diplomatic Corps from 1972 to 1981, and was advanced to Knight Grand Cross of the Royal Victorian Order when he retired from that role. He served as a Deputy Lieutenant for Wiltshire from 1974, and was also chairman of the Territorial Army and Volunteer Reserve Council.

In 1975, Fitzalan-Howard's elder brother Miles succeeded as the 17th Duke of Norfolk, and Michael became Lord Michael Fitzalan-Howard when he and his siblings were granted the rank of younger sons and daughters of a duke that year.

He succeeded the Earl Mountbatten of Burma as Gold Stick-in-Waiting and Colonel of The Life Guards in 1979, offices which he held for 20 years. He became an Extra Equerry to Queen Elizabeth II in 1999.

== Marriages and issue ==
Lord Michael married three times and was twice a widower.

He first married Jean Marion Hamilton-Dalrymple, daughter of Sir Hew Hamilton-Dalrymple, 9th Baronet, on 4 March 1946. She developed polio during pregnancy and died two days later, following the birth of their daughter:

- Jean Mary (born 28 July 1947), lady-in-waiting to Diana, Princess of Wales (1986–96), married 1976 Max Eben Lecky Pike. Her godparents were William Whitelaw, Capt. Hew Hamilton-Dalrymple; Hon. Mariegold Fitzalan-Howard and Jean Maxwell-Scott.

He remarried on 20 April 1950, to Jane Margaret Meade-Newman, daughter of Captain William Patrick Meade-Newman. They had a daughter and four sons:

- Isabel Margaret (30 January 1951 – 26 April 2026), married in 1975 Peter Christopher Bickmore
- Col. Thomas Michael (born 11 February 1952), Scots Guards, married firstly in 1977 (divorced 1992) Penelope Jan, daughter of Capt. David Christopher Richard Walters; married secondly in 1996 Joanna Mary, daughter of Robin Don
- Richard Andrew (born 15 July 1953), married in 1990 Nina, daughter of Peter Johnsen
- Henry Julia Nicholas (born 7 July 1954), married in 1987 Claire Louise, daughter of George von Mallinckrodt
- Alexander Rupert (born 29 February 1964), married in 1992 Hon. Joanna Venables-Vernon, daughter of 10th Baron Vernon

Lord Michael's second wife died on 25 December 1995. He married again, on 2 July 1997, to Victoria Winifred Baring, daughter of Colonel Reginald Edmund Maghlin Russell and the widow of Sir Mark Baring.

Lord Michael died in 2007, aged 91. He was survived by his third wife and his six children. There is a memorial to him in the Guards' Chapel, Wellington Barracks, London.

In his will, he bequeathed £15,000 to the Life Guards Association and £10,000 each to King Edward VII's Hospital and to the Catholic Church at Tisbury and Wardour.

Military offices
Preceded by Sir Basil Eugster	GOC London District; 1968–1971	Succeeded by Sir James Bowes-Lyon
