= Richard Woodget =

Captain Richard Woodget
- Born: 21 November 1845; Docking, Norfolk
- Died: 6 March 1928 (aged 82); Docking, Norfolk
- Occupation: Sea captain
- Employer: Jock Willis Shipping Line
- Known for: Master of the Cutty Sark

Cutty Sark in a photograph sometimes credited to Woodget

Richard Woodget (21 November 1845 – 5/6 March 1928) was an English sea captain, best known as the master of the famous sailing clipper Cutty Sark during her most successful period of service in the wool trade between Australia and the United Kingdom.

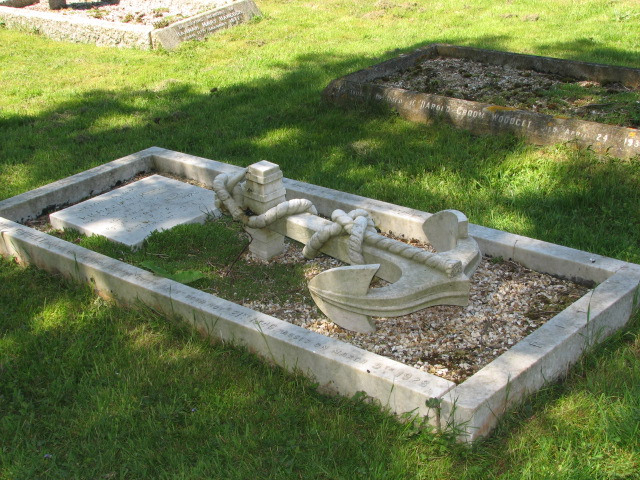
Grave at St Margaret's, Burnham Norton

Richard Woodget was the son of a farmer in Burnham Norton, Norfolk who first went to sea in the coasters plying the waters of the east coast of Britain. In 1868 he received his master's certificate at South Shields. In 1881 Jock Willis made him master of the old ship Coldstream, and in 1885 he was appointed to command Cutty Sark. A well-respected sailor and man manager, Captain Woodget made several record-breaking passages between the United Kingdom and Australia.

In 1895 Cutty Sark was sold to Portuguese interests, and Captain Woodget transferred to command Willis' Coldinghame. However he made only one voyage in this ship in 1896 before retiring from the sea. He bought a farm at Burnham Overy Staithe in his native Norfolk, where he lived until 1926. In 1921 he married Winifred Basham Parker, his second wife. He died on 5/6 March 1928 (Note: Probate notice gives his date of death as 5 March) and was buried in the churchyard of St Margaret's Church, Burnham Norton.
