= George Auldjo Jamieson =

Scottish businessman, chartered accountant and councillor

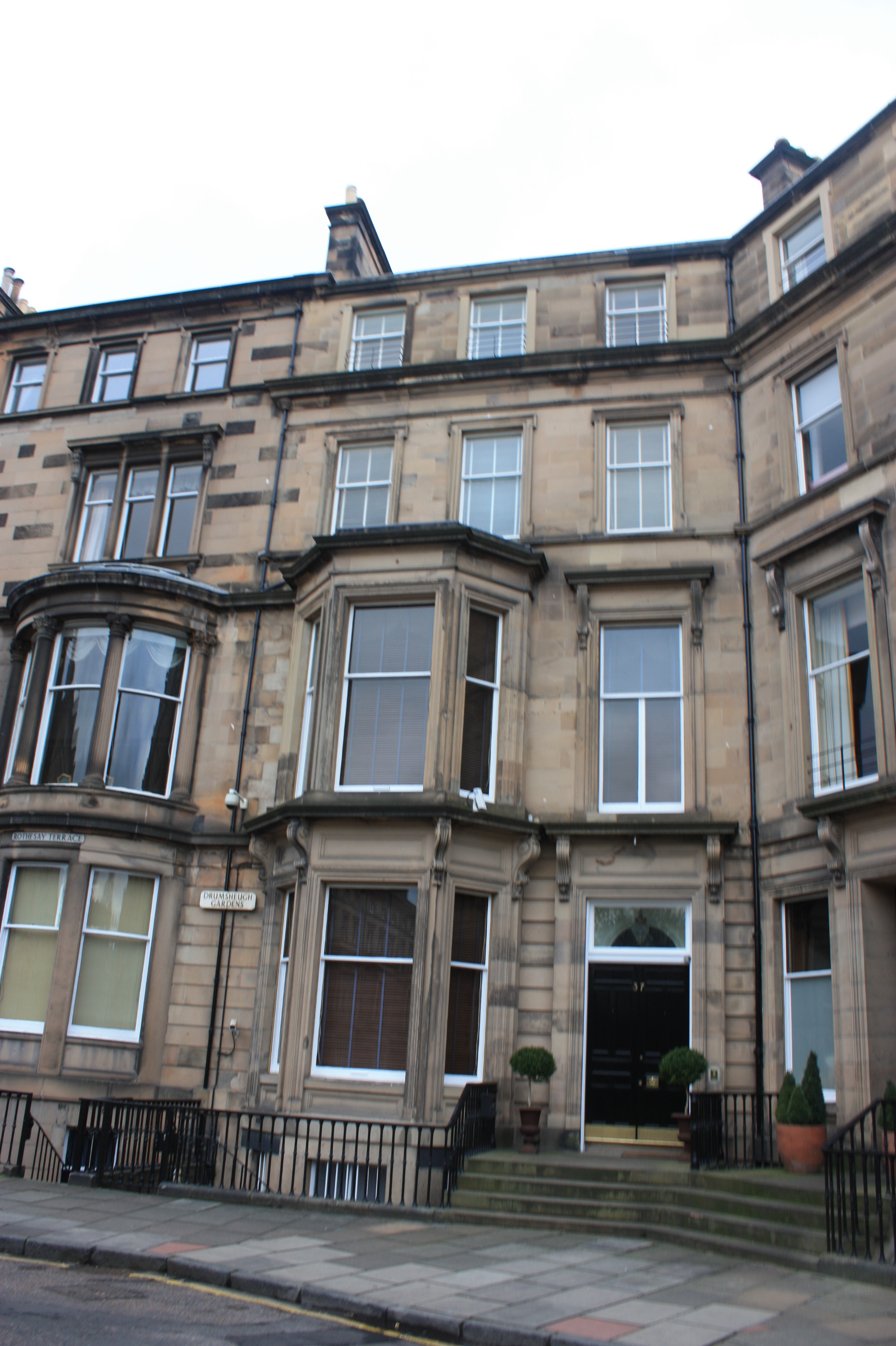
Auldjo Jamieson's house at 37 Drumsheugh Gardens, Edinburgh

George Auldjo Jamieson FRSE (1 May 1828 – 18 July 1900) was a Scottish businessman, chartered accountant and local councillor.

== Life ==
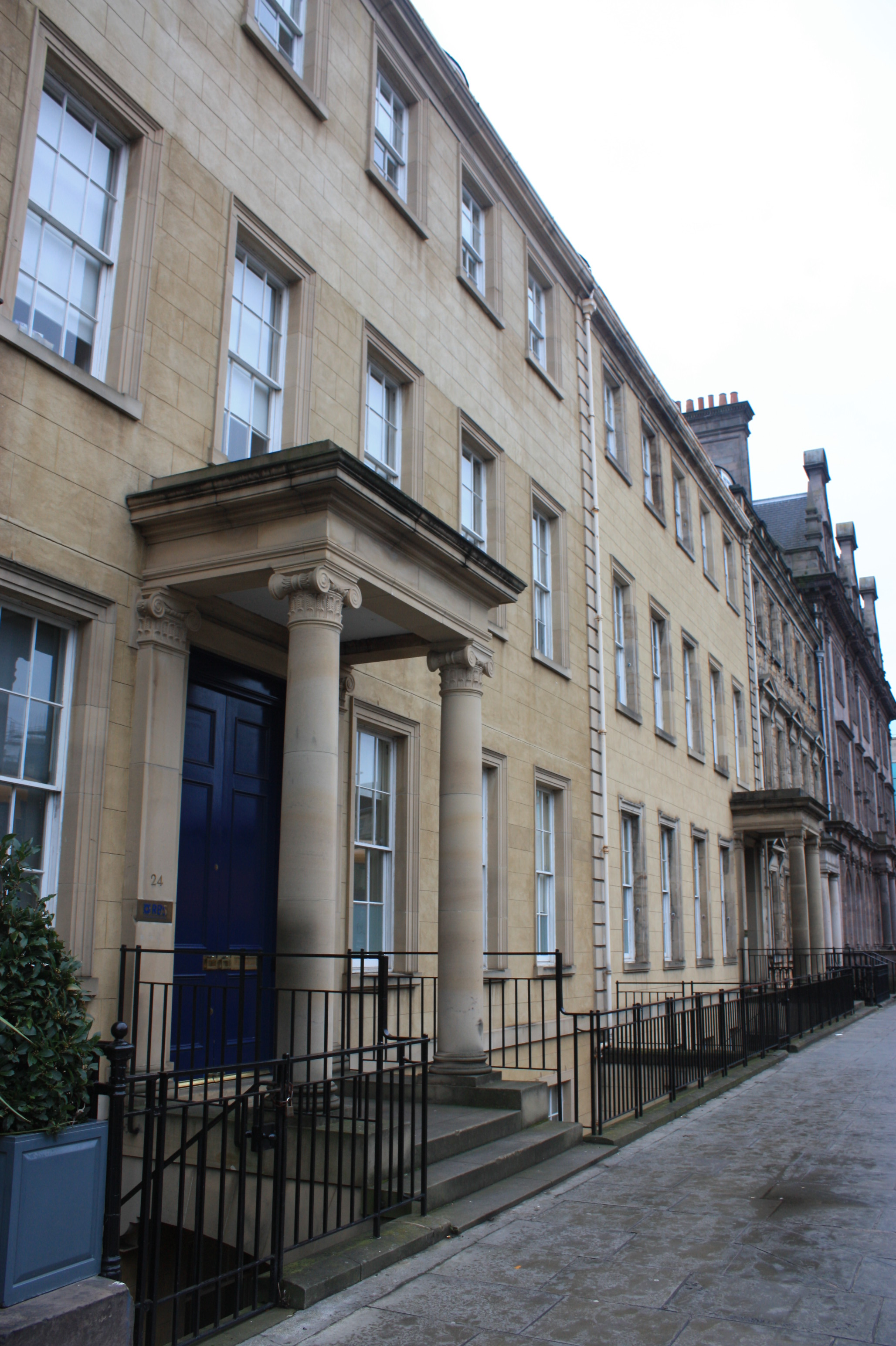
Auldjo Jamieson's offices at 23 to 25 St Andrew Square, Edinburgh

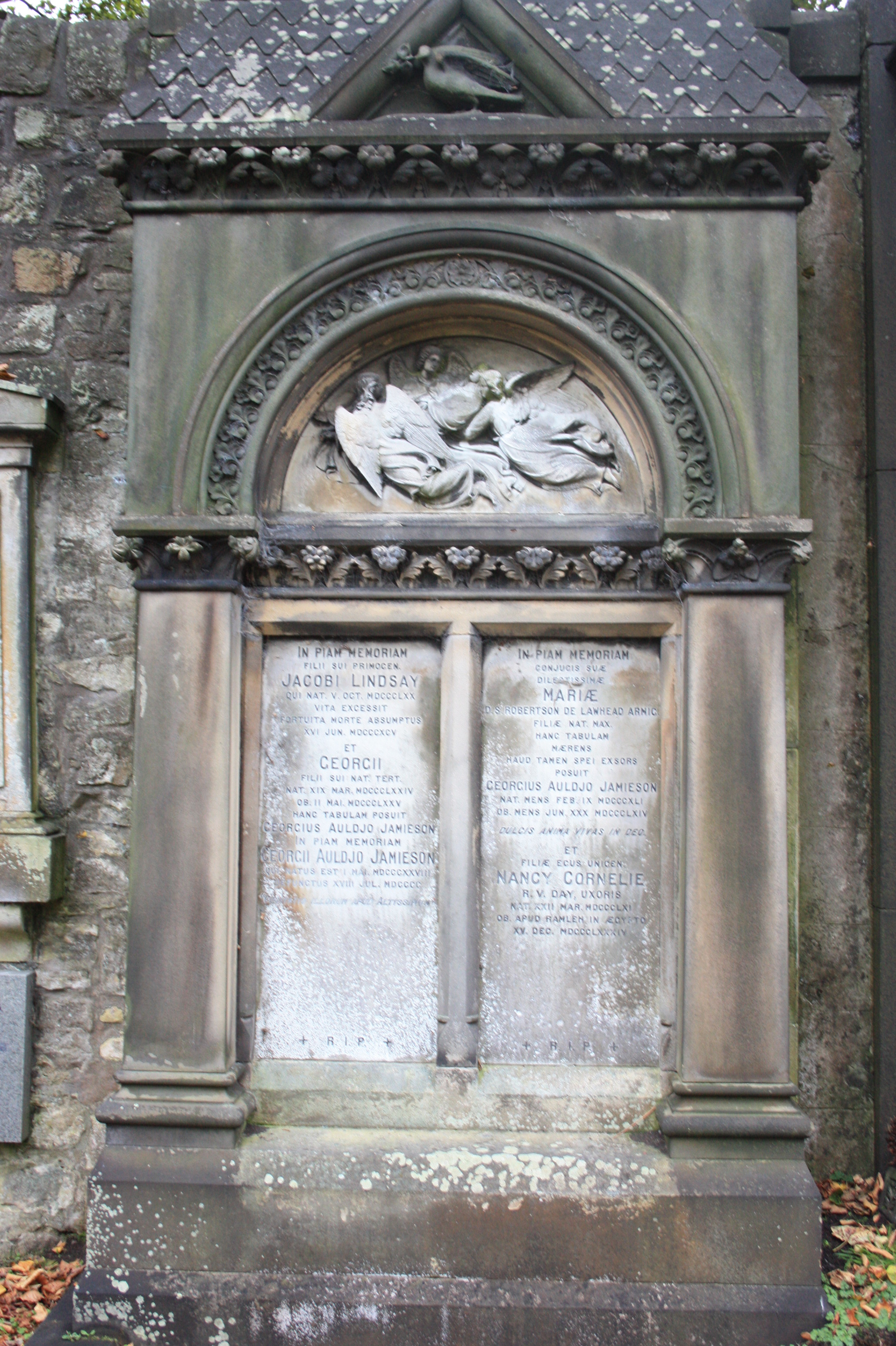
The Auldjo Jamieson memorial, Lord's Row, Dean Cemetery in Edinburgh

George Auldjo Jamieson was born in Aberdeen the son of Dr James Jamieson MD HEICS (1790–1867) and his second wife, Anne Maria Auldjo, and raised at 20 Queen Street and 4 Castle Brae in Aberdeen, but the family moved to Edinburgh in his youth. His maternal grandfather, George Auldjo, had been Lord Provost of Aberdeen 1791–92. His paternal grandfather was Robert Jamieson, a surgeon in Fraserburgh. From 1837 to 1842 he attended Aberdeen Grammar School under James Melvin. He then studied at Marischal College in Aberdeen where he graduated MA. In 1846 he went into the employ of Chalmers & Fotheringham, accountants in Aberdeen. In 1848 he moved to Edinburgh on the advice of his cousin, George Auldjo Esson. Jamieson attended classes to study Law at Edinburgh University and in 1851 officially joined his cousin's firm of Lindsay & Esson at 59 George Street in Edinburgh's New Town. At this time he was living at 16 Inverleith Row in the north of Edinburgh.

In 1856 Esson left to specialise in bankruptcy cases and the firm renamed as Lindsay & Jamieson. Jamieson became a full partner at this point. In 1858 following James Haldane joining the firm it was renamed as Lindsay, Jamieson and Haldane. The firm then relocated to 24 St Andrew Square. Over the following decades they acquired the two flanking buildings (23 and 25 St Andrew Square) and also opened branches in London. In 1858 Jamieson moved to the then newly built townhouse at 58 Melville Street in Edinburgh's West End.

He was director of the Royal Bank of Scotland and the North British and Mercantile Insurance Company, and was president of the Society of Accountants in Edinburgh. In 1860 he was elected as a Fellow of the Royal Society of Edinburgh. He was also a member of the Royal Company of Archers.

Jamieson was factor to several Highland estates and in 1883 he gave evidence on behalf of landed interests to the Royal Commission of Inquiry into the Condition of Crofters and Cottars in the Highlands and Islands, the Napier Commission.

He was a member of the Scottish Episcopalian Church and attended St John's Church on Princes Street. He stood unsuccessfully for parliament in 1885 but served as a City Councillor from 1889 until 1900.

He died at home, 37 Drumsheugh Gardens, a huge Victorian townhouse, in Edinburgh's West End, on 18 July 1900.

He is buried in the northern section of Dean Cemetery close to the north Queensferry Road wall. He is also remembered on the main Auldjo Jamieson family grave in "Lord's Row" in the main cemetery.

== Family ==
He married twice. His first marriage was in 1860 to Mary Jane Souter-Robertson. She died in 1864.

His second marriage, in 1867, was to Susan Helena Oliphant, daughter of Robert Oliphant WS. They had six sons and two daughters.

His children included James Lindsay Auldjo Jamieson, who became an engineer in Newcastle, Archibald Auldjo Jamieson and the architect, Ernest Arthur Oliphant Auldjo Jamieson (1880-1937).

His grandson David Auldjo Jamieson won the Victoria Cross during the Second World War.
