= Archibald Jamieson =

Scottish businessman and British Army soldier (1884 – 1959)

Sir Archibald Jamieson
- Born: Archibald George Auldjo Jamieson; 13 May 1884; Edinburgh, Scotland
- Died: 23 October 1959 (aged 75); Westminster, London, England
- Occupations: businessman, soldier
- Relatives: George Auldjo Jamieson (father); Ernest Auldjo Jamieson (brother); David Auldjo Jamieson, VC (son)
- Awards: Knight Commander of the Order of the British Empire; Military Cross

Sir Archibald George Auldjo Jamieson KBE MC (13 May 1884 – 23 October 1959) was a Scottish businessman and British Army soldier. He was chairman of the British arms and aircraft company Vickers during World War II.

== Early life and education ==
Jamieson was born in Edinburgh, one of eight children born to George Auldjo Jamieson and his second wife, Susan Helena (née Oliphant). He was the youngest of six sons; the architect Ernest Auldjo Jamieson was his elder brother.

His father, a significant figure in Scottish accountancy, was a senior partner in the Edinburgh accountancy firm Lindsay, Jamieson, and Haldane, and a councillor in the city. Several other members of his family were also accountants. His mother was the daughter of Robert Oliphant of Rossie.

Jamieson was educated at Winchester College and New College, Oxford.

== Career ==
Jamieson trained as an accountant and was apprenticed as a law clerk in 1901. He served during the First World War, being mentioned in despatches and awarded the Military Cross.

Jamieson became a director of armaments company Vickers in 1928 and chairman in 1937; in the late 1930s, he helped integrate the main firm more closely with its subsidiaries, increasing production in the run-up to World War II.

== Marriage and family ==
In 1917, Jamieson married Doris Pearce, daughter of Henry Pearce, RN; the couple had two sons and two daughters; their eldest son was David Auldjo Jamieson who was awarded the VC in 1944 during the Second World War.

Their other son, Gerald James "Jerrie" (died 1992), married in 1957 to Lady Mariegold Fitzalan-Howard, daughter of the 3rd Baron Howard of Glossop and sister of the 17th Duke of Norfolk. Their daughter Dinah Susan married the 4th Baron Tollemache in 1939 and was the mother of John Tollemache, 5th Baron Tollemache.

Jamieson was knighted (KBE) in 1946. Lady Jamieson died in 1947. In 1956, he remarried, to Margretta Stroup Austin. He died three years later, in 1959, at his home at 6 Smith Square, Westminster.
