= Burnham Norton =

Village in Norfolk, England

Coordinates: 52.960°N 0.722°E

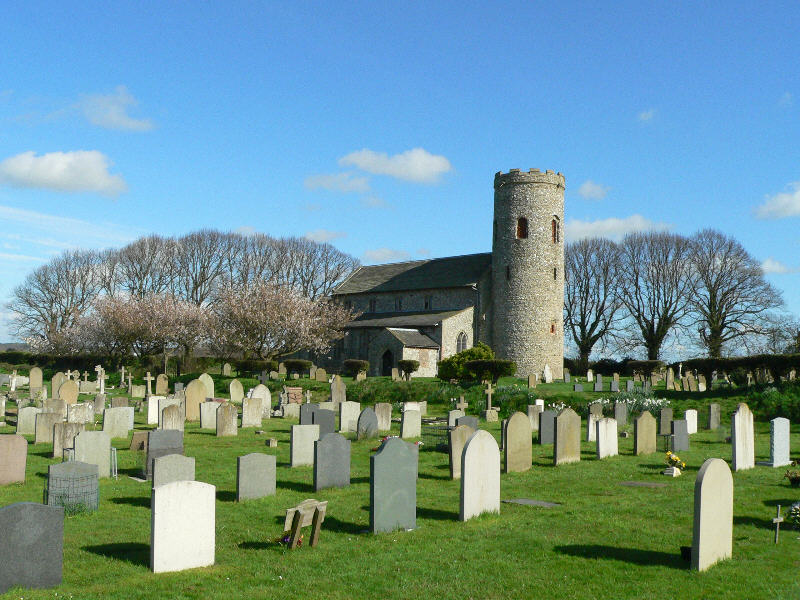
- St Margaret's Church

- Location within Norfolk
- Area: 14.81 km^{2} (5.72 sq mi)
- Population: 173 (2011)
  - Density: 12/km^{2} (31/sq mi)
- OS grid reference: TF829438
- Civil parish: Burnham Norton
- District: King's Lynn and West Norfolk
- Shire county: Norfolk
- Region: East
- Country: England
- Sovereign state: United Kingdom
- Post town: KING'S LYNN
- Postcode district: PE31
- Dialling code: 01328
- Police: Norfolk
- Fire: Norfolk
- Ambulance: East of England
- UK Parliament: North West Norfolk

Burnham Norton is a village and civil parish in the English county of Norfolk. It is 19 miles (31 km) north-east of King's Lynn and 34 miles (55 km) north-west of Norwich and is one of the seven Norfolk Burnhams.

The village is located close to the coast, and overlooks the tidal Norton Marshes and Scolt Head Island National Nature Reserve, both of which fall within the parish. The River Burn runs through the parish and the A149 road between King's Lynn and Great Yarmouth runs close to the village. At the 2001 census the parish had a population of 151. The 2011 census recorded a population of 173.

== History ==
The village name is of Anglo-Saxon origin, and in the Domesday Book it is listed in the same entry as Burnham Sutton, Burnham Ulph and Burnham Westgate as a settlement of 69 households in the hundred of Brothercross. They were divided between the estates of Roger Bigod, Ramsey Abbey and Hugh de Montfort.

Burnham Norton Friary was built in the parish in 1241 and was the first Carmelite monastery in England. The Friary was abandoned in the Dissolution of the Monasteries and is now a ruin.

== St Margaret's Church ==
Burnham Norton's parish church is dedicated to Saint Margaret and is one of Norfolk's 124 remaining round-tower churches. The church is located in the far south of the parish close to the boundary with Burnham Market and the remains of the Friary. The building is Grade I listed. The church was partly restored in the 19th century and has an elaborate painted pulpit depicting various saints. Also within the church are stained-glass windows depicting Saint Margaret of Antioch and Saint Margaret of Scotland designed by Trena Cox and a set of royal arms from the reign of King William III.

Notable burials within the churchyard include Major David Jamieson, Lady Margaret Douglas-Home and Richard Woodget.
