= Bernard Fitzalan-Howard, 3rd Baron Howard of Glossop =

British peer

The Right Honourable The Lord Howard of Glossop MBE
- Born: Bernard Edward Fitzalan-Howard; 10 May 1885
- Died: 24 August 1972 (aged 87)
- Spouse: Mona Fitzalan-Howard, 11th Baroness Beaumont (m. 1914)
- Issue: Miles Fitzalan-Howard, 17th Duke of Norfolk; Lord Michael Fitzalan-Howard; Lady Mariegold Fitzalan-Howard; Lord Martin Fitzalan-Howard; Lady Miriam Fitzalan-Howard; Lady Miranda Fitzalan-Howard; Lady Mirabel Fitzalan-Howard; Lord Mark Fitzalan-Howard
- Father: Francis Fitzalan-Howard, 2nd Baron Howard of Glossop
- Mother: Clara Greenwood

Bernard Edward Fitzalan-Howard, 3rd Baron Howard of Glossop, MBE (10 May 1885 – 24 August 1972) was a British peer.

Fitzalan-Howard was the eldest son of Francis Fitzalan-Howard, 2nd Baron Howard of Glossop and Clara Louisa (Greenwood), and grandson of Edward Fitzalan-Howard, 1st Baron Howard of Glossop, and was educated at The Oratory School and Trinity College, Cambridge. He became a Captain in the Lovat Scouts during World War I and was appointed a Member of the Order of the British Empire (MBE) in 1920.

== Marriage and children ==
On 5 September 1914, he married Mona Stapleton, 11th Baroness Beaumont. He and his wife were one of the few couples who both held noble titles in their own right. They had eight children, all of whom were given names beginning with M:

- Miles Stapleton-Fitzalan-Howard, 17th Duke of Norfolk (1915–2002); had issue including the current Duke of Norfolk
- Lord Michael Fitzalan-Howard (1916–2007); had issue
- Lady Mariegold Magdalane Fitzalan-Howard (1919–2006), married Gerald James "Jerrie" Jamieson, Esq. (son of Sir Archibald Jamieson) and had issue
- Lord Martin Fitzalan-Howard (1922–2003), married Bridget Anne Keppel and had issue
- Lady Miriam Fitzalan-Howard (1924–1996), married Lt-Cdr Peregrine Hubbard and had issue. Their granddaughter is actress Gabriella Wilde. Lady Miriam founded Moreton Hall prep school in 1962.
- Lady Miranda Fitzalan-Howard (1927-2018), married the Hon. Christopher Emmett (son of the Baroness Emmet of Amberley).
- Lady Mirabel Fitzalan-Howard (1931–2008), married Bernard Noel David George Terrence Kelly (son of diplomat Sir David Victor Kelly) and had issue.
- Lord Mark Fitzalan-Howard (born 1934), married Jacynth Lindsay, daughter of Sir Martin Lindsay, 1st Baronet, has two daughters.

== Titles ==
In 1924, Fitzalan-Howard inherited his father's barony. He was heir presumptive from 17 May 1962 to his cousin the 16th Duke of Norfolk, but predeceased him by just over two years. As is customary, when his eldest son, Miles, inherited the dukedom in 1975, Queen Elizabeth II issued a royal warrant of precedence granting his younger children the style and precedence that they would have had if their father had survived long enough to have inherited it.

== Endnotes ==
Peerage of the United Kingdom
Preceded by Francis Fitzalan-Howard	Baron Howard of Glossop; 1924–1972	Succeeded by Miles Fitzalan-Howard
