= Coldstream (1810 ship) =

History

United Kingdom
- Name: Coldstream
- Namesake: Coldstream
- Owner: EIC voyages #1-6: John Dawson; EIC voyages: John & Thomas Dawson.
- Builder: Dudman, Deptford
- Launched: 13 October 1810
- Fate: Disappeared 1835

General characteristics
- Tons burthen: 693, or 69360/94, or 700, or 704, or 733 (bm)
- Length: Overall:133 ft 11 in (40.8 m); Keel:107 ft 5 3/4 in (32.8 m)
- Beam: 34 ft 10 in (10.6 m)
- Depth of hold: 12 ft 9 in (3.9 m)
- Complement: 90
- Armament: 1811:4 × 12-pounder guns + 6 × 18-pounder carronades; 1812:20 × 12-pounder guns

Coldstream was launched in 1810. She may have sailed to the West Indies before becoming an extra ship for the British East India Company (EIC) and making nine voyages as an East Indiaman. After the end of the EIC's maritime activities Coldstream made one more voyage to India and China. She disappeared in 1835 while returning to Britain from China.

== Career ==
Coldstream first appeared Lloyds Register (LR) in 1811, with some data corrected in 1812. It is not clear whether she actually sailed to the West Indies as she did not appear in Lloyd's List's ship arrival and departure data before her first voyage for the EIC.

Year	Master	Owner	Trade	Source
1812	S.Mansell	Dawson & Co.	London–West Indies	LR

1st EIC voyage (1812–1813): On 9 October 1811 the EIC accepted Coldstream for one voyage at a rate of £37 9s per ton (for 693 tons). Captain James P. Mansell acquired a letter of marque on 4 January 1812. He sailed from Portsmouth on 10 March 1812, bound for St Helena, Bengal, and Madras. Coldstream reached St Helena on 20 June. She arrived at Saugor on 19 September and Calcutta on 8 October. Homeward bound, she was at Saugor on 23 December, Vizagapatam on 22 January 1813, Masulipatam on 16 February, and Madras on 26 February. She was at Point de Galle on 19 March, reached St Helena on 9 June, and arrived at Long Reach on 13 August.

2nd EIC voyage (1814–1815): The EIC engaged Coldstream on 4 February 1814 for one voyage at a rate of £29 18s per ton burthen. Captain Mansell sailed from Portsmouth on 8 June 1814, bound for Bengal. Coldstream was at Madeira on 23 June and arrived at Bengal in September. Homeward bound, she left Bengal in May 1815, was at the Cape on 1 June, reached St Helena on 13 July, and arrived at Long Reach on 20 September.

3rd EIC voyage (1816–1817): On 20 October 1815 the EIC engaged Coldstream for one voyage to China. The rate was £26 13s per ton burthen for a direct voyage and £27 17s for a voyage by a circuitous route. Captain James Coxwell sailed from the Downs on 8 March 1816, bound to St Helena and China (directly). Coldstream was at St Helena on 21 May and arrived at Whampoa Anchorage on 19 September. Homeward bound, she crossed the Second Bar on 9 January 1817. She reached St Helena on 18 March and arrived at Blackwall on 25 May.

4th EIC voyage (1820–1821): The EIC engaged Coldstream on 26 January 1820 for one voyage at a rate of £11 16s per ton burthen, for 704 tons. Captain Thomas Dormer sailed from the Downs on 22 May 1820, bound for Madras and Bengal. (Note: His previous voyage had been as master on Lady Lushington.) Coldstream reached Madras on 3 September and arrived at Diamond Harbour on 22 September. Captain Dormer died in Bengal on 10 October 1820. Homeward bound, she was at Kedgeree on 2 December, reached St Helena on 16 February 1821, and arrived back at Long Reach on 18 April.

5th EIC voyage (1822–1823): The EIC engaged Coldstream on 16 January 1822 for one voyage at a rate of £13 9s per to burthen, for 733 tons. Captain George Stephens sailed from Falmouth on 15 June 1822, bound for Bengal and Madras. Coldstream reached the Cape on 3 October and arrived at Diamond Harbour on 17 December. She left Bengal on 14 February 1823, reached Madras on 23 February and St Helena on 9 May, and arrived at Blackwall on 10 July.

6th EIC voyage (1825–1826): The EIC engaged Coldstream on 30 March 1825 for one voyage at a rate of £12 5s per ton burthen, for 733 tons. Captain William Hall sailed from the Downs on 22 May 1825, bound for Madras and Bengal. Coldstream reached Madras on 10 September and arrived at Kedgeree on 3 October. She left Bengal on 1 January 1826, was at Madras on 15 January, reached St Helena on 6 April, and arrived back at Long reach on 9 June.

7th EIC voyage (1826–1828): The EIC engaged Coldstream on 2 August 1826 to convey troops and stores to Bengal at a rate of £4 19s per ton burthen for 733 tons. Captain George Stephens sailed from Portsmouth on 14 Sep 1826, bound for Madras and Bengal. Coldstream reached Madras on 11 Jan 1827. She was at Penang on 25 February before she arrived at Calcutta on 27 March. Her voyage ended on 8 January 1828.

8th EIC voyage (1828): The EIC engaged Coldstream on 2 June 1828 to convey troops to the Cape, Ceylon, and Bengal at a rate of £4 2s per ton burthen for 733 tons. Captain Miller sailed from the Downs on 2 July 1828. Coldstream was at Madeira on 31 July and the Cape on 29 September. She arrived at Calcutta on 10 December.

9th EIC voyage (1831–1832): The EIC engaged Coldstream on 29 April 1831 for a voyage to China, Halifax, and QUebec at a rate of £9 11s 6d per ton burthen for 733 tons. Captain William Hall sailed from the Downs on 4 June 1831, bound for China and Quebec. She reached Whampoa on 24 October. On her return voyage she crossed the Second Bar on 15 January 1832, reached St Helena on 9 April, and arrived at Quebec on 16 June. She arrived at Deal on 10 September.

The EIC ended its maritime activities in 1833 and Coldstream became a general trader.

Year	Master	Owner	Trade	Source & notes
1833	Hall	Dawson	London–China	LR; small repairs 1825 and large repair 1828

In 1834 she sailed from Deal for Madras and Bengal with detachments of the 55th, 57th, and 63rd Regiments of Foot. On 30 September she arrived at Calcutta from Madras and London. On 27 February 1835 she sailed from Saugor, bound for China.

== Fate ==
Coldstream, P.Burt, master, disappeared in 1835 while sailing from China to London. By April 1836 Lloyd's was starting to pay out for her loss. Her entry in LR for 1837 carried the annotation "LOST".
