= Moreton Hall, Bury St Edmunds =

Country house in Suffolk, England

Coordinates: 52.2464°N 0.7378°E

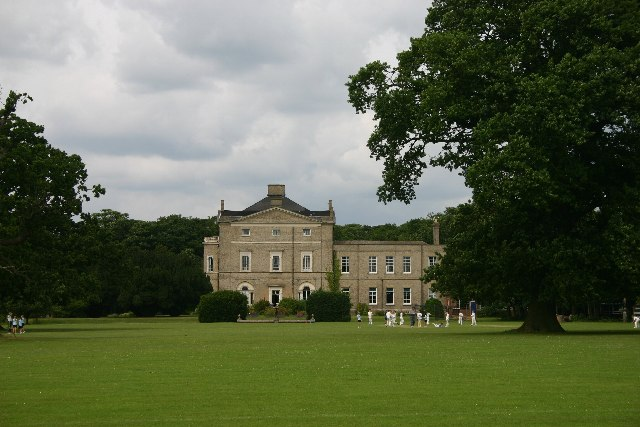
Exterior of Moreton Hall in 2005

Moreton Hall is a Grade II* listed building in Bury St Edmunds, a market town in the county of Suffolk, England. It was designed by the Scottish architect Robert Adam and built in 1773 as a country house for John Symonds (1729–1807), a clergyman and Professor of Modern History at Cambridge University. The building was originally known as "St. Edmund's Hill". It was later called "The Mount" and from 1890 "Moreton Hall".

== School ==
From 1962, the building and surrounding 30 acres of parkland was used by the Moreton Hall Preparatory School, an independent co-educational preparatory school founded by Lady Miriam Fitzalan-Howard (daughter of Lord Howard of Glossop) and her husband Commander Peregrine Hubbard. Hubbard and Geoffrey de Guingand served jointly as the school's first headmasters. The Moreton Hall School Trust acquired the freehold to the building and parklands in 2009. It was affiliated with the Roman Catholic church but accepts all pupils regardless of denomination.

The school was divided into two sections: pre-prep and prep. The pre-prep took pupils from aged 2 years and 8 months to 7 years. Prep consisted of pupils in Years 3–8. Boarding was offered to pupils aged 8 and above.

The school closed permanently on 30 June 2020 due to the COVID-19 pandemic.

== Owners and residents ==
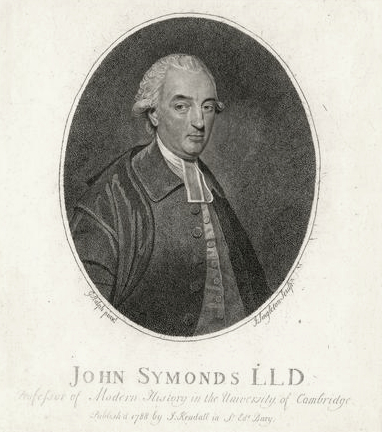
John Symonds, 1788 engraving

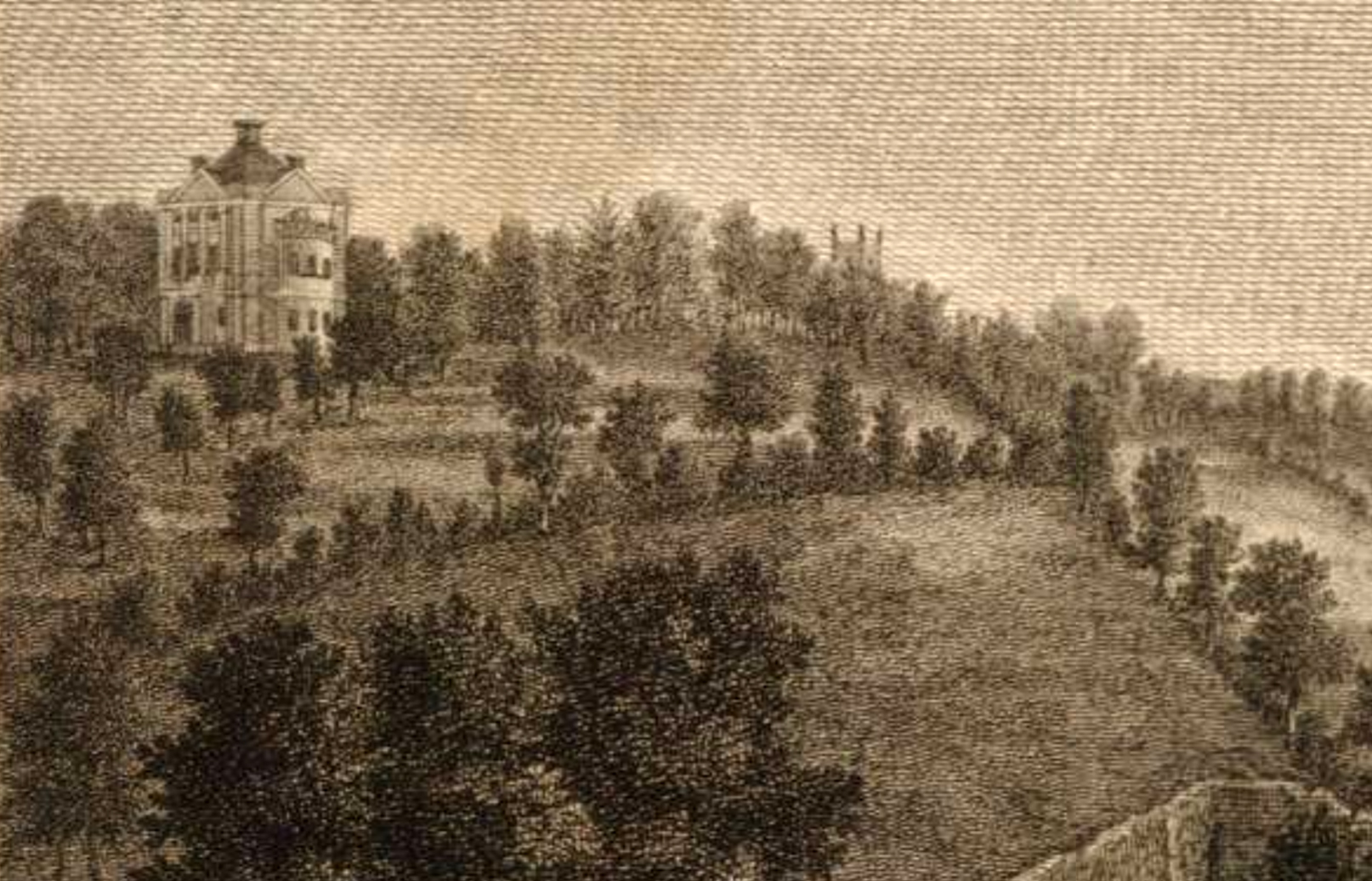
Moreton Hall (then called St Edmund's Hill) 1774 shortly after it was built

John Symonds (1730–1807) built the Hall which was he called St Edmund's Hill in 1773. He was the eldest son of the rector of Horringer. His mother was the daughter of Merilina Jermyn whose family owned the nearby Rushbrooke estate. He was educated at the University of Cambridge and later became its Regius Professor of Modern History. In 1768 he was made the Recorder of Bury St Edmunds.

Symonds built the Hall on property which he inherited from his maternal grandmother Merilina Jermyn. It was her share of the Jermyn estate. His Diary records that the foundation stone was laid on 2 April 1773 and that the architect was Adam. The Adam block was built as a cube, with a parapet and a wood cornice. The eastern wing was added in the mid nineteenth century. An engraving of part of Bury St Edmunds was made in 1774 immediately after the Hall was built which shows the new Adam structure on the extreme left.

Symonds did not marry and when his younger brother Captain Thomas Symonds retired in 1788 he invited him and his wife Elizabeth Malet with their children to come and live at the Hall. This family remained with him until Thomas’s death in 1792.

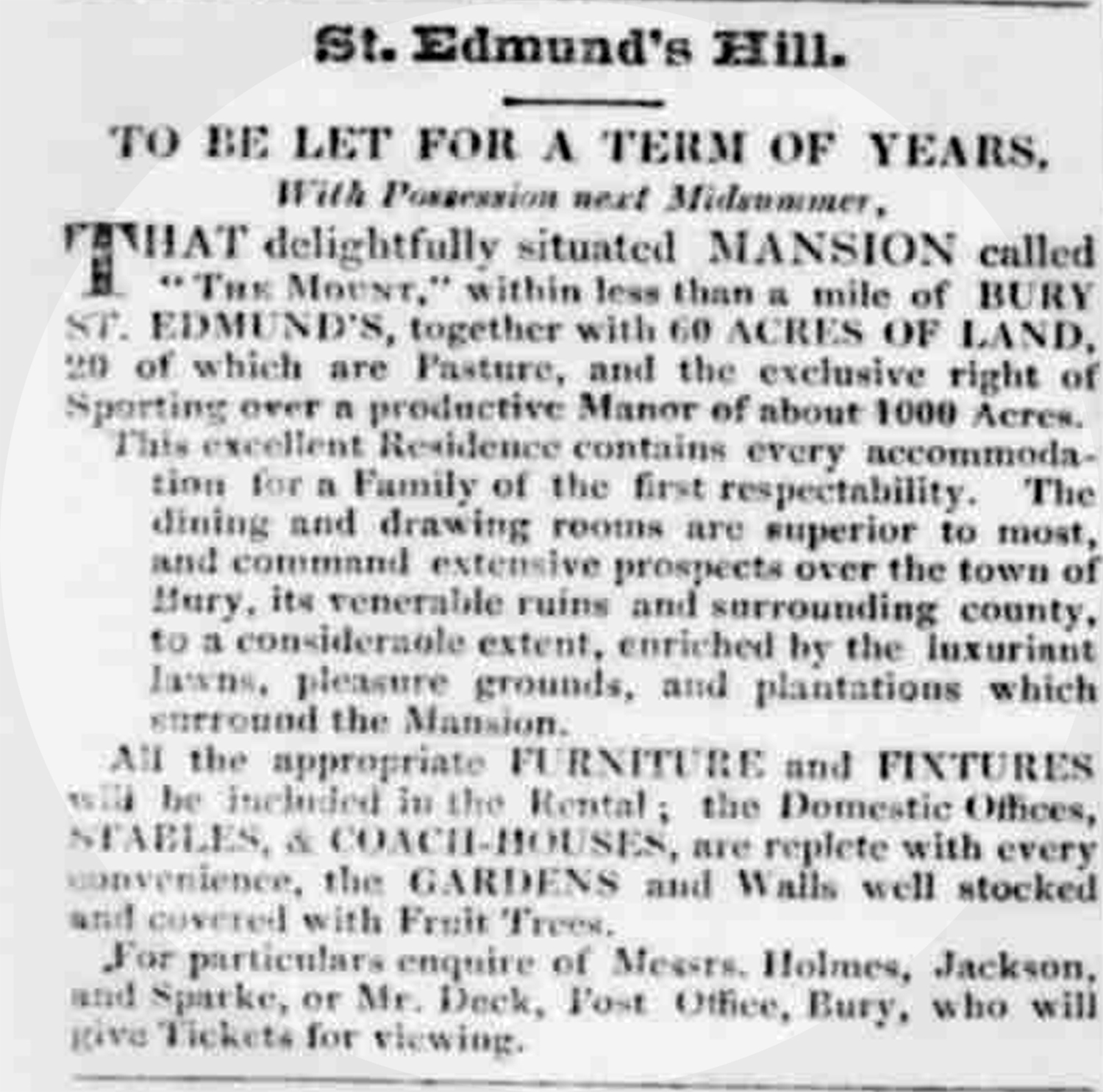
Rental notice in 1833

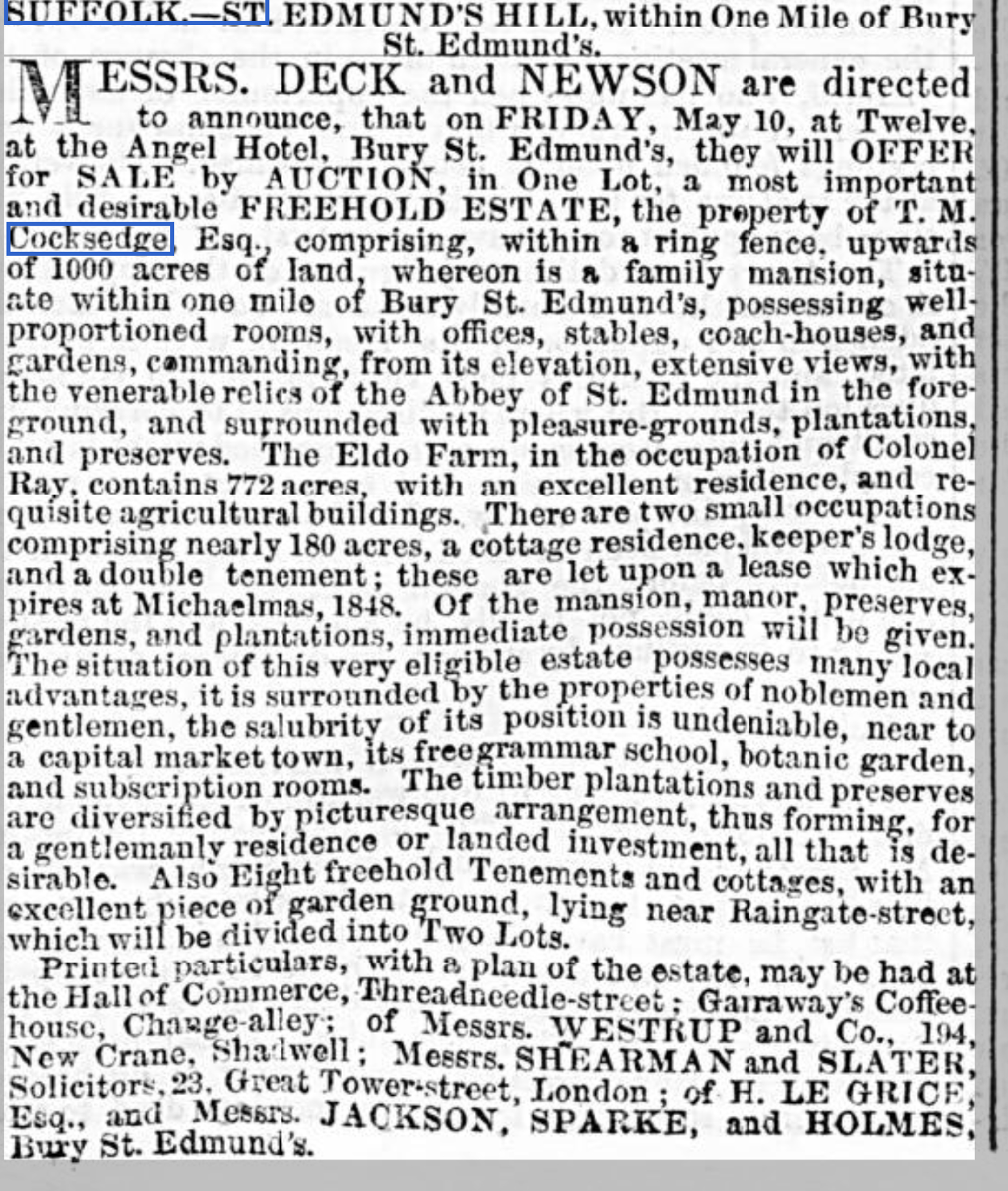
Sale notice 1844

Shortly after Symonds died in 1807, the Hall was sold to Thomas Cocksedge (1748–1833). It appears that he bought it for his son Martin Thomas Cocksedge (1781–1824) who was married in this year. Martin lived with his wife Mary Susanna Leheup (1787–1858) at the Hall until his death in 1824. During this time they had nine children. He was a Captain in the Second Dragoon “Royal Scots Greys”. After Martin’s death in 1824 his wife continued to live at the Hall intermittently and also rented it to wealthy tenants. One of these was Henry Franklyn who lived there between about 1826 and 1833. In 1833 the house was advertised again as a rental property and the advertisement is shown. By this date the name had been changed to "The Mount".

When Martin's son Thomas Martin Cocksedge (1816–1846) came of age in 1837 he took possession of the Hall. He lived there for about seven years and then advertised the property for sale in 1844. It was bought by John Josselyn who lived there with his family for the next forty years.

John Josselyn (1816–1884) was a wealthy land owner. He was the only son of John Josselyn (1781–1820) of Horkesley and Boxted Hall. His father died when John was an infant but his property was left to him. Much of the estate including Boxted Hall was sold and when John came of age he inherited a fortune. In 1837 he married Mary Ann Sarah Bishop (1813–1897), the daughter of a clergyman. The couple had eight children. It appears that it was he who added the additional wing on the east. He died in 1884 and the house was advertised for sale. It was bought in 1890 by Ferdinand John Eyre.

Ferdinand John Eyre (1856–1928) was a landowner. His father was Vincent Eyre of Lindley Hall. In 1880 he married Mary Gabrielle Constance Helen Paston-Bedingfeld (1846–1937) the daughter of Sir Henry Paston-Bedingfeld, 6th Baronet. The couple who had no children lived at the Hall for forty years. They changed the name from “The Mount” to “Moreton Hall”. He was the mayor of Bury and High Sheriff of Suffolk. When he died in 1928 the Hall was put on the market. In 1932 it was bought by Percy Ridley Thompson.

Percy Ridley Thompson (1860–1955) and his second wife Alice Bower (1874–1951) lived at the Hall until 1947 when it was sold and became a school.
