= Coldstream Packet (1794 ship) =

History

Great Britain
- Name: Coldstream Packet
- Builder: Robert Gowans, Berwick,
- Launched: 1794
- Fate: Foundered circa 10 November 1822

General characteristics
- Tons burthen: 87 (bm)
- Sail plan: Smack
- Armament: 6 × 18-pounder carronades

Coldstream Packet was launched at Berwick-upon-Tweed in 1794. During the period of the French Revolutionary and Napoleonic Wars she was an armed smack, sailing from Berwick or Leith to other ports in Great Britain. She disappeared in November 1822, believed to have foundered in bad weather.

== Career ==
Although Coldstream Packet was launched in 1794, she first appeared in Lloyd's Register (LR) in 1797.

For about five years (1806–1811), Coldstream Packet sailed for the Union Shipping Company, of Berwick, established in 1794. She may have been sailing for the company from the start of her career as a book published in 1799 lists her as one of eleven smacks sailing for the company. The Company apparently first entered into the Leith trade in 1796.

On 30 November 1796 Coldstream Packet, F.Ord, master, was coming into Berwick harbour from Leith when she grounded on Spittle Point. It was expected that she would be gotten off. In the meantime, her crew and passengers were able to get to shore, though with some difficulty.

Year	Master	Owner	Trade	Source & notes
1797	F.Ord	Forster	Leith–London	LR
1799	F.Ord; J.Watson	Forster	Leith–London	LR
1802	J.Watson; W.Ord	Forster	Leith–London	LR
1806	W.Ord; Peele	Union Shipping Co	Leith–London	LR
1808	J.Peele; Miller	Union Shipping Co	Leith–London	LR
1809	A.Miller; Marshall	Union shipping Co.	Cowes transport	LR
1810	T.Marshall	Union Shipping Co	Leith–London	LR
1811	T.Marshall; D.Lister	Union Shipping Co.	Leith–London	LR
1812	D.Lister	R.Stone	Leith–Shetland	LR
1816	D,Lister	Strong & Co.	Leith–Shetland	LR; repairs 1812
1818	W.Allen; J.Whitson	Captain & Co.	Leith–Shetland	LR; repairs 1812
1820	J.Whitson; P.Smith	Strange & Co.	Liverpool–Limerick	LR; repairs 1812
1821	P.Smith	Strange & Co.	Leith–Lerwick	LR; repairs 1812
1822	P.Smith; Colville	Strange & Co.	Leith–Lerwick	LR; repairs 1812

== Fate ==
Coldstream Packet sailed from Lerwick, Shetland Islands to Leith on 8 November 1822. She was last seen on 10 November and was believed to have foundered off Kinnaird Head, Aberdeenshire. She had a crew of eight and was carrying eight passengers. The Register of Shipping for 1823 carried the annotation "LOST" by her name.
