= David Jamieson (VC) =

British Army officer (1920–2001)

- Born: 1 October 1920; Westminster, London, England
- Died: 5 May 2001 (aged 80); Burnham Market, Norfolk, England
- Burial place: St Margaret's Church, Burnham Norton, Norfolk
- Relatives: Sir Archibald Jamieson (father)
- Military career
- Allegiance: United Kingdom
- Branch: British Army
- Service years: 1939–1948
- Rank: Major
- Service number: 90577
- Unit: Royal Norfolk Regiment
- Conflicts: Second World War
- Awards: Victoria Cross; Commander of the Royal Victorian Order

Major David Auldjo Jamieson, VC, CVO (1 October 1920 – 5 May 2001) was a British Army officer in the Second World War who received the Victoria Cross, the highest award for gallantry in the face of the enemy that can be awarded to British and Commonwealth forces.

== Early life ==
David Auldjo Jamieson was born in Westminster on 1 October 1920, the elder son of Sir Archibald Auldjo Jamieson, chairman of Vickers Armstrong. He attended Ladycross School at Seaford, East Sussex, and Eton College where he was a cadet in the Officers' Training Corps. In his youth he spent time at the family holiday retreat in Norfolk.

He volunteered in the Territorial Army unit at Dersingham for the 5th Battalion, Royal Norfolk Regiment, and was commissioned as a second lieutenant in May 1939. He was transferred to the 7th Battalion, formed as a 2nd Line duplicate of the 5th Bn when the Territorial Army was doubled in size.

== Second World War ==
Aged 19 on the outbreak of the Second World War, Jamieson was considered too young for overseas service and did not initially go with the battalion to join the British Expeditionary Force (BEF) when it went to France in 1940 but followed later.

The battalion was assigned to pioneer duties in France with the BEF. In May 1940, it was attached to the 51st (Highland) Infantry Division which was stationed on the Maginot Line and therefore escaped encirclement with the majority of the BEF during the Battle of France. The 7th Royal Norfolks suffered heavy casualties when the 51st (Highland) Infantry Division was surrounded and forced to surrender on 12 June 1940, with only 31 members of the battalion managing to return to Britain. When the majority of the battalion was captured at Saint-Valery-en-Caux, he was at Rouen and was able to return to Britain.

The battalion was reformed in 1941 and Jamieson was promoted to company commander of D Company. In 1942, the battalion was transferred to the 176th Infantry Brigade of the 59th (Staffordshire) Infantry Division. The 59th Division, commanded by Major General Lewis Lyne, was one of the follow-up units after the Normandy landings in June 1944.

The battalion was involved in the Battle of Normandy, including the capture of Caen during Operation Charnwood, where the battalion suffered over 150 casualties, which was followed by the Second Battle of the Odon. For his leadership Ian Freeland was appointed a Companion of the Distinguished Service Order (DSO).

=== Victoria Cross ===
Jamieson was a 23-year-old captain in the 7th Battalion of the Royal Norfolk Regiment, part of the 176th Infantry Brigade attached to the 59th (Staffordshire) Infantry Division, when the following deed took place for which he was awarded the Victoria Cross. On 7/8 August 1944, south of Grimbosq, Normandy, France, Jamieson was in command of D Company, being the only officer remaining, which had established a bridgehead over the River Orne. The enemy made seven counter-attacks on the company's position by elements of the 271st Volksgrenadier Division and 12th SS Panzer Division Hitlerjugend, but throughout 36 hours of bitter and close fighting Captain Jamieson's company refused to give up. The attacks included assaults with Tiger and Panther tanks which shot up the Churchill tanks supporting the Royal Norfolks.

Jamieson was giving map references for British artillery; directing the resources of first the divisional artillery, then the medium artillery of the corps.

Jamieson at one point mounted the last British tank to talk to the commander under enemy fire in order to direct the tank to retreat. He dismissed it as anything heroic, saying that he had to as the telephone didn't work – tanks were equipped with an external handset so that the commander could talk to an infantry commander without opening the hatch. The image of Captain Jamieson riding a Churchill tank while enemy tanks attacked was immortalised in a painting. As he was talking to the commander, the tank was hit and Jamieson blown off. He returned to his "hole" where he received treatment - he had lost an eye and was bleeding from his arm. After relief by another battalion, Jamieson was evacuated to a first aid post and then back to the UK.

The citation for Jamieson in the London Gazette reads, in part:

...Throughout this thirty-six hours of bitter and close fighting, and despite the pain of his wounds, Captain Jamieson showed superb qualities of leadership and great personal bravery. There were times when the position appeared hopeless, but on each occasion it was restored by his coolness and determination. He personally was largely responsible for the holding of this important bridgehead over the River Orne and the repulse of seven German counter-attacks with great loss to the enemy.

— London Gazette supplement, 26 October 1944

== Post-war ==
Following the war, he worked for the Australian Agricultural Company, which ran several sheep and cattle stations; he became a director in 1949 and was Governor from 1951 to 1975. He was also director of other companies including National Westminster Bank.

In 1948 he married Nancy Elwes, who died in a car accident in 1963. He remarried, to Joanna Windsor-Clive, in 1969.

He was appointed High Sheriff of Norfolk in 1979. In 1968 he was appointed to the Honourable Corps of Gentlemen at Arms, retiring as lieutenant in 1990. In the 1990 New Year Honours he was appointed Commander of the Royal Victorian Order (CVO). Due to his height, 6 ft 5 in (1.96 m), he was informally designated the ceremonial umbrella man to Queen Elizabeth the Queen Mother, carrying an umbrella over her at social functions.

He died on 5 May 2001 in Burnham Market, Norfolk, and was interred in the churchyard of St Margaret's Church in Burnham Norton. He was survived by his widow, his son Andrew Jamieson, and two daughters of his first marriage, three grandchildren, and by a stepson and stepdaughter.

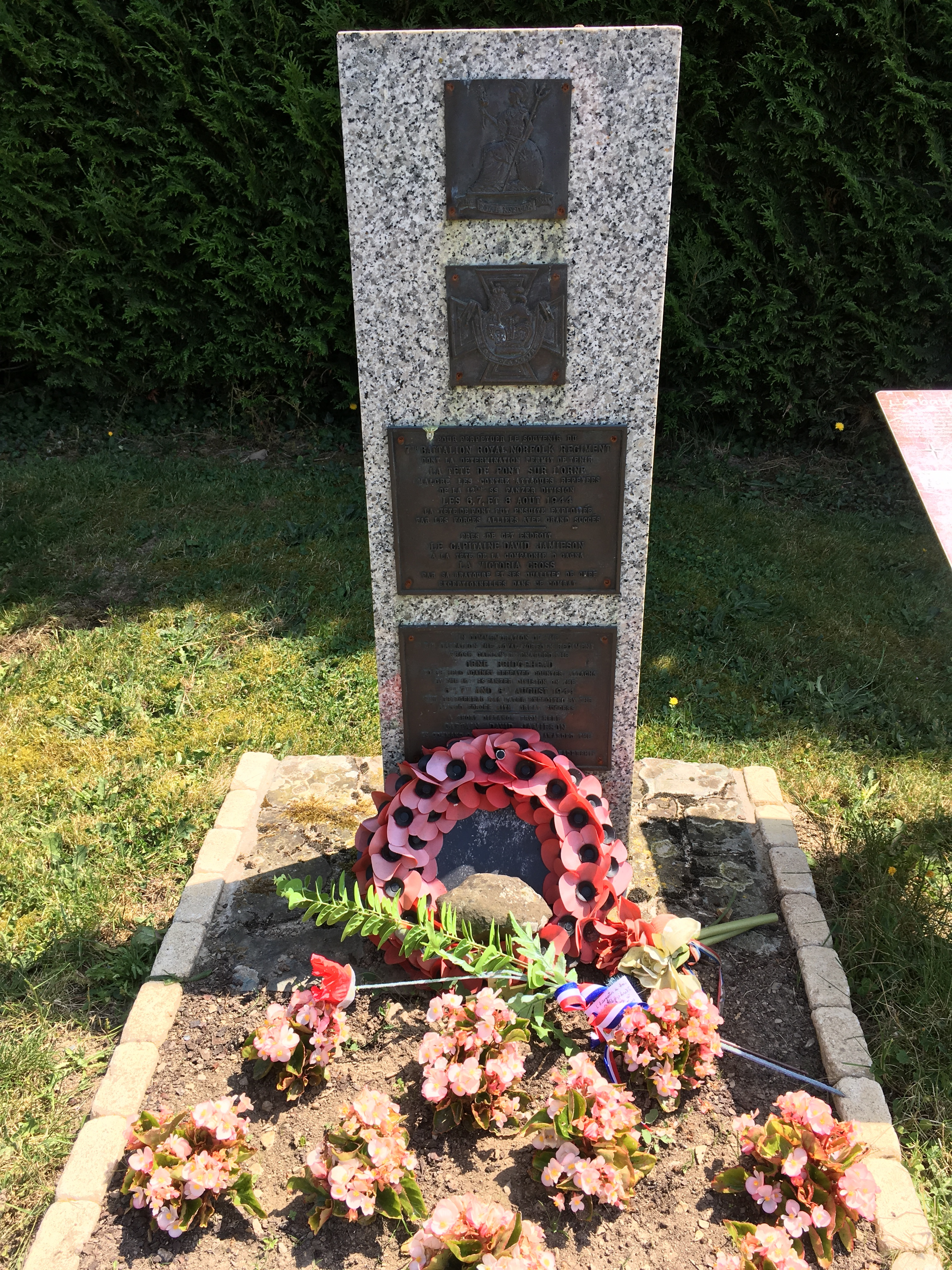
Captain David Jamieson VC monument at Le Vieux Grimbosq (49.039028,-0.455667)

== Medals ==
David Jamieson's Victoria Cross is displayed in the Royal Norfolk Regimental Museum in Norwich Castle.

Jamieson was awarded the following service and commemorative medals:

- 1939–45 Star
- France and Germany Star
- Defence Medal
- War Medal
- Queen Elizabeth II Coronation Medal
- Queen Elizabeth II Silver Jubilee Medal

== See also ==
- Sidney Bates of the 1st Bn Royal Norfolk who earned the VC on 6 August 1944

== Bibliography ==
- Laffin, John (1997). British VCs of World War 2: A Study in Heroism. Sutton Publishing. ISBN 0-7509-1026-7.
- Buzzell, Nora, ed. (1997). The Register of the Victoria Cross. Cheltenham, Gloucestershire: This England Alma House. ISBN 0-906324-27-0.
- Bailey, Roderick (2011) [2010]. Forgotten Voices of the Victoria Cross. Ebury.
- Joslen, Lt-Col H.F. (1960). Orders of Battle, United Kingdom and Colonial Formations and Units in the Second World War, 1939–1945. London: HM Stationery Office. ISBN 1-843424-74-6.
