= Miles Fitzalan-Howard, 17th Duke of Norfolk =

British Army general and peer (1915–2002)

Major-General His Grace The Duke of Norfolk KG GCVO CB CBE MC DL
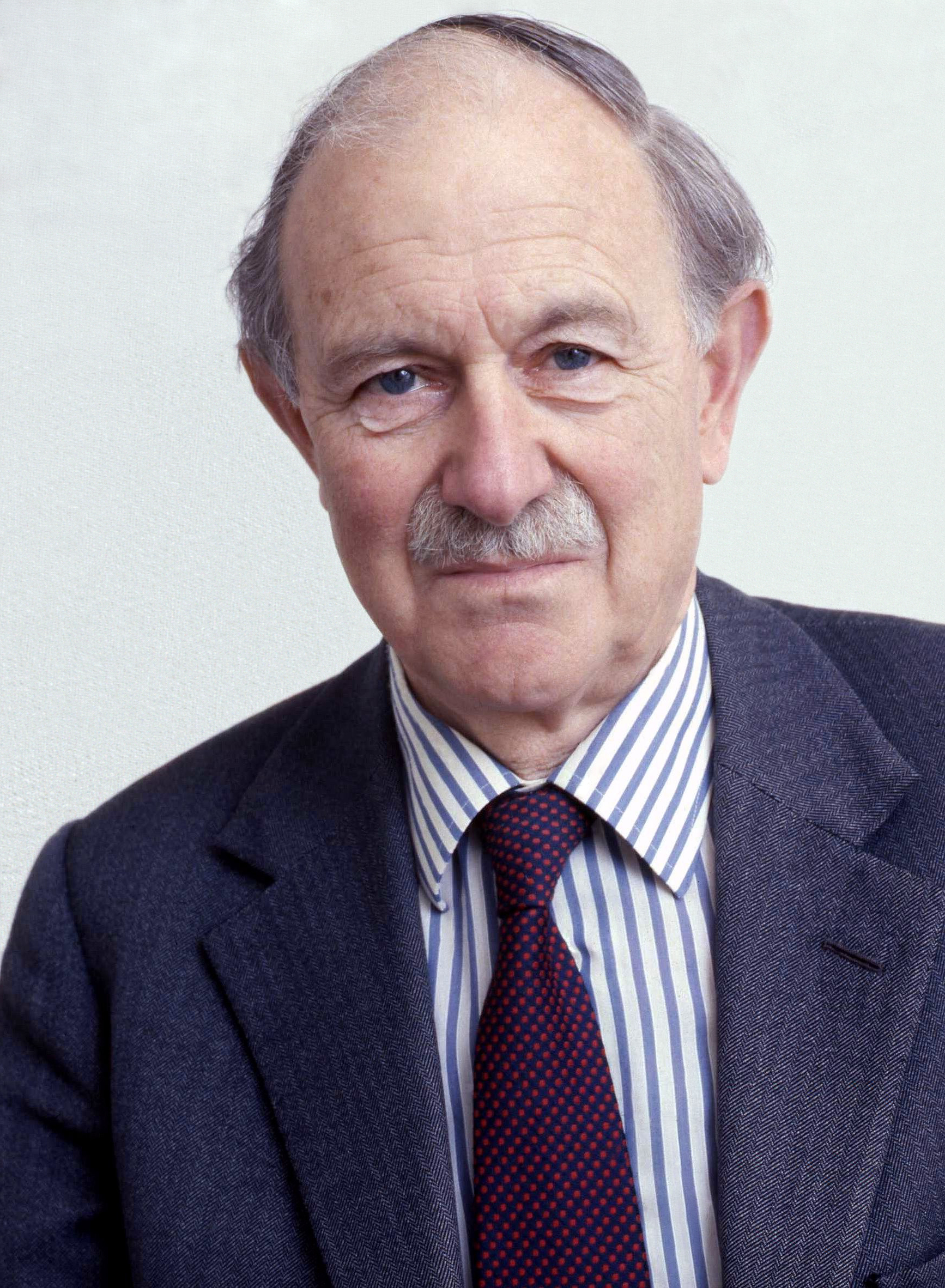
- Portrait by Allan Warren

Earl Marshal
- In office 31 January 1975 – 24 June 2002
- Monarch: Elizabeth II
- Preceded by: The 16th Duke of Norfolk
- Succeeded by: The 18th Duke of Norfolk

Member of the House of Lords
- Lord Temporal
- Hereditary peerage 31 August 1971 – 11 November 1999
- Preceded by: The 11th Baroness Beaumont
- Succeeded by: Seat abolished
- Ex officio as Earl Marshal; 11 November 1999 – 24 June 2002
- Succeeded by: The 18th Duke of Norfolk

Personal details
- Born: Hon. Miles Francis Fitzalan-Howard; 21 July 1915 49 Eaton Place, London, England
- Died: 24 June 2002 (aged 86) Bacres House, Hambleden, Buckinghamshire, England
- Resting place: Fitzalan Chapel, Arundel Castle
- Citizenship: British
- Party: Conservative
- Spouse: Anne Constable-Maxwell (m. 1949)
- Children: 5, including: Tessa Balfour, Countess of Balfour; Lady Marcia Fitzalan-Howard; Edward Fitzalan-Howard, 18th Duke of Norfolk
- Parents: Bernard Fitzalan-Howard, 3rd Baron Howard of Glossop; Mona Stapleton, 11th Baroness Beaumont
- Education: Christ Church, Oxford
- Profession: Soldier
- Title: Duke of Norfolk
- Tenure: 31 January 1975 – 24 June 2002
- Predecessor: Bernard Fitzalan-Howard, 16th Duke of Norfolk
- Successor: Edward Fitzalan-Howard, 18th Duke of Norfolk

Military service
- Allegiance: United Kingdom
- Branch/service: British Army
- Years of service: 1936–1967
- Rank: Major-General
- Unit: Grenadier Guards
- Commands: Director of Service Intelligence; Director of Management and Support Intelligence; 1st Division
- Battles/wars: Second World War
- Awards: Companion of the Order of the Bath; Commander of the Order of the British Empire; Military Cross

Major-General Miles Francis Stapleton Fitzalan-Howard, 17th Duke of Norfolk (21 July 1915 – 24 June 2002), known between 1971 and 1972 as the Lord Beaumont and until 1975 as the Lord Beaumont and Howard of Glossop, was a British Army general and peer. He was the eldest son of Bernard Fitzalan-Howard, 3rd Baron Howard of Glossop, and his wife Mona Fitzalan-Howard, 11th Baroness Beaumont.

Besides inheriting the lordships from his father and mother, in 1975, he inherited the Dukedom of Norfolk from his second cousin once removed, making him the premier duke in the Peerage of England.

== Military career ==
Educated at Ampleforth College and Christ Church, Oxford, Miles Fitzalan-Howard was commissioned as a second lieutenant in the Territorial Army as a university candidate on 3 July 1936. and was subsequently commissioned in the same rank in the Grenadier Guards on 27 August 1937, with seniority from 30 January 1936. His service number was 52703. He was promoted to lieutenant on 30 January 1939 and to captain on 30 January 1944.

In April 1944, as a temporary major during the Second World War, he was awarded the Military Cross "in recognition of gallant and distinguished services in Italy" for reconnaissance of mined roads. He was at the time on foot and under enemy fire. He was quoted in his obituary in The Independent as saying: "Anyone can be the Duke of Norfolk, but I'm rather proud of that medal."

Fitzalan-Howard was promoted to the substantive rank of major on 30 January 1949. Promoted to lieutenant-colonel on 28 February 1955, he was appointed Chief of the British mission to the Soviet forces in Germany in 1957, and received a promotion to colonel on 24 April 1958 He was appointed a Commander of the Order of the British Empire (CBE), Military Division, in the 1960 New Year Honours.

In 1961, he was appointed Commander of the 70th Brigade (King's African Rifles and the Kenya Regiment), just before Kenyan independence. Promoted to brigadier on 1 January 1963, he became General Officer Commanding 1st Division on 5 November, with the rank of temporary major general. He was confirmed in the substantive rank of major-general in February 1964, retroactive to 5 November and with seniority from 10 April 1963.

After relinquishing his command on 5 November 1965, he became Director of Management and Support Intelligence at the Ministry of Defence on 6 January 1966 Appointed a Companion of the Order of the Bath (CB) in the 1966 Queen's Birthday Honours, he was appointed Director of Service Intelligence at the Ministry of Defence on 29 July. He relinquished this appointment on 18 September of the following year and retired the same day, after 31 years of service.

== Lordship ==
=== Baronies of Beaumont and Howard of Glossop ===
The Duke inherited the Barony of Beaumont from his mother, the 11th Baroness, in 1971, and the Barony Howard of Glossop from his father, the 3rd Baron, in 1972.

=== Dukedom of Norfolk ===
When he was Lord Beaumont he inherited the Dukedom of Norfolk from his second cousin once removed, The 16th Duke of Norfolk, in 1975 and added his mother's maiden name of Stapleton before his own that year. He also inherited the Great Office of Earl Marshal and Hereditary Marshal of England, which is attached to the Dukedom of Norfolk, thereby becoming responsible for State occasions. He became, by virtue of this office, the hereditary judge of the Court of Chivalry and head of the College of Arms, responsible for heraldry in England and Wales as well as other parts of the Commonwealth of Nations such as Australia and New Zealand.

He cancelled a plan to give Arundel Castle to the National Trust, instead creating an independent charitable trust to maintain the castle.

The Dukes of Norfolk remained Roman Catholic despite the Reformation (see recusancy). The Duke, as senior Roman Catholic peer of the United Kingdom, represented The Queen at the installations of Pope John Paul I and Pope John Paul II and at the funeral of Pope John Paul I. The 17th Duke was the patron of many Catholic charities and benevolent organisations, including the Catholic Building Society.

== Personal life ==
One of eight children (all of whose first names started with the letter "M"), the Duke married Anne Mary Teresa Constable-Maxwell in 1949. They had two sons and three daughters:

- Lady Tessa Mary Isabel Fitzalan-Howard (born 20 September 1950), married Roderick Balfour, 5th Earl of Balfour; has issue, four daughters, one of whom is the playwright, Lady Kinvara Balfour.
- Lady Carina Mary Gabrielle Fitzalan-Howard (born 20 February 1952), married Sir David Frost; has issue.
- Lady Marcia Mary Josephine Fitzalan-Howard (born 10 March 1953), better known as the actress Marsha Fitzalan, married Patrick Ryecart (marriage dissolved); has issue.
- Edward Fitzalan-Howard, 18th Duke of Norfolk (b. 2 December 1956), married Georgina Susan Gore, has issue.
- Lord Gerald Bernard Fitzalan-Howard (born 13 June 1962), married Emma Roberts; has issue. He has resided with his family at Carlton Towers since 1991.

The Duke lived in the parish of Hambleden until his death on 24 June 2002. He was buried at Fitzalan Chapel on the western grounds of Arundel Castle. A memorial service was held at Westminster Cathedral, celebrated by the Cardinal Archbishop of Westminster; the congregation was led by Princess Alexandra of Kent representing the Queen and by Field Marshal Lord Bramall representing the Duke of Edinburgh.

=== Catholicism ===
He was Catholic but publicly disagreed with the Church's categorical opposition to birth control. At a conference of Catholic teachers, he said, "How can you ask a married couple to do it by thermometers and what not? My wife and I did that – it didn't bloody work. Has everybody got to have eight children like my mother?"

== Honours and awards ==
Domestic

- Royal Victorian Chain (2000)
- Knight Companion of the Order of the Garter (1983)
- Knight Grand Cross of the Royal Victorian Order (1986)
- Companion of the Order of the Bath (1966)
- Commander of the Order of the British Empire (1960)
- Military Cross
- Deputy Lieutenant of West Sussex

Foreign

- Holy See: Knight Grand Cross of the Order of Pius IX
- Sovereign Order of Malta: Grand Cross pro merito Melitensi

== Family ==
=== Ancestry ===
Ancestors of Miles Fitzalan-Howard, 17th Duke of Norfolk

8. Edward George Fitzalan-Howard, 1st Baron Howard of Glossop
4. Francis Edward Fitzalan-Howard, 2nd Baron Howard of Glossop
9. Augusta Talbot
2. Bernard Fitzalan-Howard, 3rd Baron Howard of Glossop
10. John Greenwood
5. Clara Louisa Greenwood (1852–1887)
11. Louisa Elizabeth Barnardiston (1828–1891)
1. Miles Stapleton-Fitzalan-Howard, 17th Duke of Norfolk
12. Miles Thomas Stapleton, 8th Lord Beaumont
6. Miles Stapleton, 10th Lord Beaumont
13. Isabella Ann Browne
3. Mona Stapleton, 11th Baroness Beaumont
14. Sir Charles Henry Tempest, 1st Baronet
7. Ethel Mary Tempest
15. Cecilia Elizabeth Tichborne Hibbert

=== Family tree ===
Family tree of the Dukes of Norfolk and Suke of Surrey; Earls of Arundel, East Anglia, Norfolk, Norwich, Nottingham, and Surrey; and Barons Mowbray, Segrave and Stourton

Earl of East Anglia (Earls of Norfolk and Suffolk) (1st creation), before 1069
Ralph the Staller c. 1011–1068; 1st Earl of Norfolk and Suffolk, or of the East Angles (c. 1066/67–1068)
Earl of Surrey (1st creation), c. 1088
Ralph de Gael c. 1040 – c. 1096; 2nd Earl of Norfolk and Suffolk, or of the East Angles (until 1074)	Roger Bigod of Norfolk d. 1107	William de Warenne c. 1035–1088; 1st Earl (of) Warenne / Earl of Surrey, Lord of Lewes, Seigneur de Varennes
Earldom forfeit, 1074
Earl of Norfolk (2nd creation), 1141
King Henry I c. 1068–1135	Maud Bigod	Hugh Bigod; 1095–1177; 1st Earl of Norfolk (1141–1177)	William de Warenne d. 1138; 2nd Earl (of) Warenne / Earl of Surrey
Earl of Arundel, Earl of Sussex (1st creations), c. 1138
Empress Matilda c. 1102–1167	Geoffrey Plantagenet; 1113–1251; Count of Anjou	Adeliza of Louvain c. 1103–1151	William d'Aubigny c. 1109–1176; 1st Earl of Arundel, Earl of Sussex, Earl of Lincoln	William de Warenne; 1119–1148; 3rd Earl of Surrey
King Henry II; 1133–1189	William d'Aubigny b. c. 1138/1150–1176; 2nd Earl of Arundel, Earl of Sussex	Roger Bigod c. 1144/1150–1221; 2nd Earl of Norfolk (1189–1221, disputed 1177–1189)	William of Blois c. 1137–1159	Isabel de Warenne c. 1130 – 1203; 4th Countess of Surrey suo jure	Hamelin de Warenne c. 1130–1202; Comte de Warenne / Earl of Surrey, jure uxoris
King John; 1166/1167–1216	William d'Aubigny before 1180–1221; 3rd Earl of Arundel, Earl of Sussex	Hugh Bigod; 1186–1225; 3rd Earl of Norfolk (1221–1225)	Maud Marshal; 1192–1248	William de Warenne c. 1160s/1170s–1240 5th Earl of Surrey
William d'Aubigny c. 1203–before 1224; 4th Earl of Arundel, Earl of Sussex	Hugh d'Aubigny d. 1243; 5th Earl of Arundel, Earl of Sussex	Isabel d'Aubigny	John Fitzalan; 1200–1240; 3rd Lord of Clun and Oswestry	Roger Bigod c. 1209–1270; 4th Earl of Norfolk (1233–1270)	Hugh Bigod c. 1211–1266
King Henry III; 1207–1272	John Fitzalan; 1223–1267; 6th Earl of Arundel, Earl of Sussex, jure matris	John de Warenne; 1231–1304; 6th Earl of Surrey
Baron Segrave of Se(a)grave, 1283
Nicholas Segrave c. 1238–bef. 1295; 1st Baron Segrave	King Edward I 1239–1307	Edmund Crouchback; 1245–1296; Earl of Lancaster	John Fitzalan; 1246–1272; 7th Earl of Arundel, Earl of Sussex, jure matris	Roger Bigod c. 1245–1306; 5th Earl of Norfolk (1270–1306)
Earldom extinct, 1270
Baron Mowbray, 1283	Earl of Arundel (2nd (1st by writ) creation), 1289
John Segrave c. 1256–1325; 2nd Baron Segrave	Roger de Mowbray; 1254–1297; 1st Baron Mowbray	Richard Fitzalan; 1267–1302; 1st (or 6th) Earl of Arundel	William de Warenne; 1256–1286
Earl of Norfolk (3rd creation), 1312
Stephen Segrave d. 1325; 3rd Baron Segrave	Thomas of Brotherton; 1300–1338; 1st Earl of Norfolk (1312–1338)	John Mowbray; 1286–1322; 2nd Baron Mowbray	Henry c. 1281–1345; Earl of Leicester, Earl of Lancaster	Edmund Fitzalan; 1286–1326; 2nd (or 7th) Earl of Arundel	Alice de Warenne; 1287–1388 heir apparent to the Earldom of Surrey	John de Warenne; 1286–1347; 7th Earl of Surrey
Earldom of Arundel (2nd creation) forfeit, 1326
Earldom of Arundel (2nd creation) restored, 1331
John Segrave; 1315–1353; 4th Baron Segrave	Margaret of Brotherton; 1320–1399; 2nd Countess of Norfolk (1338–1399), Duchess of Norfolk "for life" (1397–1399)	John Mowbray; 1310–1361; 3rd Baron Mowbray	Joan of Lancaster c. 1312–1349	Eleanor of Lancaster; 1318–1372	Richard FitzAlan c. 1313–1376; 3rd (or 8th) Earl of Arundel, 8th Earl of Surrey
Baron Arundel, 1377
Elizabeth de Segrave; 1338–1368; 5th Baroness Segrave	John de Mowbray; 1340–1368; 4th Baron Mowbray	Richard FitzAlan; 1346–1397; 4th (or 9th) Earl of Arundel, 9th Earl of Surrey	John FitzAlan c. 1348–1379; 1st Baron Arundel	Alice FitzAlan
Earldom of Arundel (2nd creation) forfeit, 1397
Earl of Nottingham (1st creation), 1377	Earl of Nottingham (2nd creation), 1383; Duke of Norfolk (1st creation), 1397	Duke of Surrey, 1397
John de Mowbray; 1365–1383; 1st Earl of Nottingham, 6th Baron Segrave, 5th Baron Mowbray	Thomas de Mowbray; 1366–1399; 1st Duke of Norfolk (1397–1399), 3rd Earl of Norfolk (1399), 7th Baron Segrave, 6th Baron Mowbray	Elizabeth Fitzalan; 1366–1425	John FitzAlan; 1364–1390; 2nd Baron Arundel	Thomas Holland; 1372–1400; Duke of Surrey, Earl of Kent, Baron Holland
Earldom of Nottingham extinct, 1383	Titles forfeit, 1399	Dukedom of Surrey renounced, 1400
Baron Stourton, 1448	Duke of Norfolk (1st creation restored), 1425	Earldom of Arundel (2nd creation) restored, 1400
John Stourton; 1400–1462; 1st Baron Stourton (1448–1462)	Thomas de Mowbray; 1385–1405; 4th Earl of Norfolk, 8th Baron Segrave, 7th Baron Mowbray (1399–1405)	John de Mowbray; 1392–1432; 2nd Duke of Norfolk (1425–1432), 5th Earl of Norfolk, 9th Baron Segrave, 8th Baron Mowbray (1405–1432)	Margaret de Mowbray c. 1388–1459	Robert Howard; 1385–1436	Isabel de Mowbray c. 1400–1452	Thomas FitzAlan; 1381–1415; 5th (or 10th) Earl of Arundel, 10th Earl of Surrey	John Fitzalan; 1385–1421; 6th (or 11th) Earl of Arundel, 3rd Baron Arundel, 3rd Baron Maltravers
Duke of Norfolk (4th creation), 1483
William Stourton before 1426–1478; 2nd Baron Stourton (1462–1478)	John de Mowbray; 1415–1461; 3rd Duke of Norfolk, 6th Earl of Norfolk, 10th Baron Segrave, 9th Baron Mowbray (1432–1461)	John Howard; 1425–1485; 1st Duke of Norfolk, 13th Baron Segrave, 12th Baron Mowbray (1483–1485)	John Fitzalan; 1408–1435; 7th (or 12th) Earl of Arundel, 4th Baron Arundel, 4th Baron Maltravers	William Fitzalan; 1417–1487; 9th (or 14th) Earl of Arundel, 6th Baron Arundel, 6th Baron Maltravers
Titles forfeit, 1485
Earl of Surrey (2nd creation), 1451	Duke of Norfolk (4th creation) restored and Earl of Surrey, 1514
John Stourton c. 1454–1485; 3rd Baron Stourton (1479–1485)	William Stourton c. 1457–1524; 5th Baron Stourton (1487–1524)	John de Mowbray; 1444–1476; 4th Duke of Norfolk, 7th Earl of Norfolk, Earl of Surrey, 11th Baron Segrave, 10th Baron Mowbray (1461–1476)	King Edward IV; 1442–1483	Thomas Howard; 1443–1524; 2nd Duke of Norfolk, 1st Earl of Surrey (1514–1524)	Humfrey Fitzalan; 1429–1438; 8th (or 13th) Earl of Arundel, 5th Baron Arundel, 5th Baron Maltravers	Thomas Fitzalan; 1450–1524; 10th (or 15th) Earl of Arundel, 7th Baron Arundel, 7th Baron Maltravers
Dukedom of Norfolk, Earldom of Nottingham, Earldom of Surrey extinct, 1476
Duke of Norfolk (3rd creation), Earl of Nottingham (3rd creation), and Earl of Surrey, 1477
Francis Stourton; 1485–1487; 4th Baron Stourton (1485–1487)	Edward Stourton; 1463–1535; 6th Baron Stourton (1524–1535)	Anne de Mowbray; 1472–1481; 8th Countess of Norfolk, 12th Baroness Segrave, 11th Baroness Mowbray (1476–1481)	Richard of Shrewsbury; 1473–1483; Duke of York, Duke of Norfolk, Earl of Nottingham, Earl of Warenne (1477–1483)	Anne of York; 1475–1511	Thomas Howard; 1473–1554; 3rd Duke of Norfolk, 2nd Earl of Surrey (1524–1554)	Edmund Howard c. 1478–1539	Elizabeth Boleyn c. 1480–1538	William Fitzalan; 1476–1544; 11th (or 16th) Earl of Arundel, 8th Baron Arundel, 8th Baron Maltravers
Earldom of Norfolk extinct and Baronies Segrave and Mowbray in abeyance, 1481	Dukedom of Norfolk, Earldom of Nottingham, Earldom of Surrey extinct, 1483	Attainted, 1547; Restored, 1553
William Stourton c. 1505–1548; 7th Baron Stourton	Earl of Nottingham (5th creation), 1525	King Henry VIII; 1491–1547	Anne Boleyn c. 1501 or 1507–1536
Viscount Howard of Bindon, 1559
Charles Stourton c. 1520–1557; 8th Baron Stourton	Henry Howard; 1517–1547 styled Earl of Surrey	Thomas Howard c. 1520–1582; 1st Viscount Howard of Bindon	Mary FitzRoy; 1519–1557	Henry FitzRoy; 1519–1536; Duke of Richmond and Somerset, Earl of Nottingham	Catherine Howard c. 1524–1542	Henry Fitzalan; 1512–1580; 12th (or 17th) Earl of Arundel, 9th Baron Arundel, 9th Baron Maltravers
Earldom of Nottingham extinct, 1536
Thomas Howard; 1536–1572; 4th Duke of Norfolk, 3rd Earl of Surrey, 13th Baron Mowbray (1554–1572)	Henry Howard; 1540–1614; Earl of Northampton	Queen Elizabeth I 1533–1603	Mary FitzAlan; 1540–1557
Dukedom (3rd creation) forfeit, 1572
Earl of Arundel (3rd creation), 1580	Earl of Suffolk (4th creation), 1603
John Stourton; 1553–1588; 9th Baron Stourton	Edward Stourton c. 1555–1633; 10th Baron Stourton	Philip Howard; 1557–1595; 20th/13th/1st Earl of Arundel, styled Earl of Surrey	Thomas Howard; 1561–1626; Earl of Suffolk	Lord William Howard; 1563–1640
Earldom of Arundel and Barony of Mowbray attainted, 1589	see Earls, Marquesses, and Dukes of Suffolk family tree
Earl of Arundel (3rd creation) and Barony of Mowbray restored, 1604; Earl of Norfolk (5th creation), 1644
William Stourton c. 1594–1672; 11th Baron Stourton	Thomas Howard; 1585–1646; 21st/14th/2nd Earl of Arundel, 2nd/4th Earl of Surrey, 1st Earl of Norfolk, 14th Baron Mowbray (1644–1646)	Philip
see Earls of Shrewsbury family tree
Edward Stourton; 1617–1644	Henry Frederick Howard; 1608–1652; 22nd/15th/3rd Earl of Arundel, 3rd/5th Earl of Surrey, 2nd Earl of Norfolk, 15th Baron Mowbray (1646–1652)	Alethea Howard; 1585–1654; 17th Baroness Strange of Blackmere, 14th Baroness Talbot, 13th Baroness Furnivall	William Howard; 1614–1680; 1st Viscount Stafford	William
Duke of Norfolk (4th creation restored), 1660	Baron Howard of Castle Rising, 1669; Earl of Norwich (3rd creation), 1672
William Stourton d. 1685; 12th Baron Stourton	Thomas Howard; 1627–1677; 5th Duke of Norfolk, 21st/14th/2nd Earl of Arundel, 4th/6th Earl of Surrey, 16th Baron Mowbray (1660–1677); 18th Baron Strange of Blackmere, 15th Baron Talbot, 14th Baron Furnivall (1654–1677)	Henry Howard; 1628–1684; 6th Duke of Norfolk, 22nd/15th/3rd Earl of Arundel, 5th/7th Earl of Surrey, 1st Earl of Norwich, etc. 18th Baron Strange of Blackmere, 17th Baron Mowbray, 15th Baron Talbot, 14th Baron Furnivall (1672–1684)	Charles Howard; 1630–1713	Col. Bernard Howard; 1641–1717	Charles Howard, 1st Earl of Carlisle Earls of Carlisle
Edward Stourton; 1665–1720; 13th Baron Stourton	Thomas Stourton; 1667–1744; 14th Baron Stourton	Charles Stourton; 1669–1739	Henry Howard; 1655–1701; 7th Duke of Norfolk, 22nd/15th/3rd Earl of Arundel, 5th/7th Earl of Surrey, 2nd Earl of Norwich, etc. 18th Baron Mowbray, 19th Baron Strange of Blackmere, 15th Baron Talbot, 14th Baron Furnivall (1684–1701)	Lord Thomas Howard; 1662–1689	Henry Charles Howard d. 1720
Thomas Howard; 1683–1732; 8th Duke of Norfolk, 23rd/16th/4th Earl of Arundel, 6th/8th Earl of Surrey, 3rd Earl of Norwich, etc. 18th Baron Strange of Blackmere, 15th Baron Talbot, 14th Baron Furnivall, 19th Baron Mowbray (1701–1732)	Edward Howard; 1685–1777; 9th Duke of Norfolk, 24th/17th/5th Earl of Arundel, 7th/9th Earl of Surrey, 4th Earl of Norwich, etc. 20th Baron Mowbray, 20th Baron Strange of Blackmere, 15th Baron Talbot, 14th Baron Furnivall (1732–1777)	Philip Howard; 1688–1750	Bernard Howard; 1674–1735
Earldom of Norwich (3rd creation) and Barony of Howard of Castle Rising extinct and Baronies of Furnivall, Mowbray, Segrave, Strange of Blackmere, and Talbot abeyant, 1777
Charles Stourton; 1702–1753; 15th Baron Stourton	William Stourton; 1704–1781; 16th Baron Stourton	Winifred Howard; 1726–1753	Anne Howard; 1742–1787	Charles Howard; 1720–1786; 10th Duke of Norfolk, 25th/18th/6th Earl of Arundel, 8th/10th Earl of Surrey (1777–1786)	Henry Howard; 1713–1787
Charles Philip Stourton; 1752–1816; 17th Baron Stourton	Charles Howard; 1746–1815; 11th Duke of Norfolk, 26th/19th/7th Earl of Arundel, 9th/11th Earl of Surrey (1786–1815)
William Stourton; 1776–1846; 18th Baron Stourton	Bernard Howard; 1765–1842; 12th Duke of Norfolk, 27th/20th/8th Earl of Arundel, 10th/12th Earl of Surrey (1815–1842)
Charles Stourton; 1802–1872; 19th Baron Stourton	Henry Howard; 1791–1856; 13th Duke of Norfolk, 28th/21st/9th Earl of Arundel, 11th/13th Earl of Surrey (1842–1856)
Baron Mowbray and Baron Segrave abeayance restored, 1878	Baron Howard of Glossop
Alfred Joseph Stourton; 1829–1893; 24th Baron Segrave, 21st/23rd Baron Mowbray, 20th Baron Stourton	Henry Granville Fitzalan-Howard; 1815–1860; 14th Duke of Norfolk, 29th/22nd/10th Earl of Arundel, 12th/14th Earl of Surrey (1856–1860)	Edward George Fitzalan-Howard; 1818–1883; 1st Baron Howard of Glossop
Charles Botolph Joseph Stourton; 1867–1936; 25th Baron Segrave, 22nd/24th Baron Mowbray, 21st Baron Stourton	Henry Fitzalan-Howard; 1847–1917; 15th Duke of Norfolk, 30th/23rd/11th Earl of Arundel, 13th/15th Earl of Surrey, Lord Maltravers, Earl of Arundel and Surrey (1860–1917)	Francis Fitzalan-Howard; 1859–1924; 2nd Baron Howard of Glossop
William Marmaduke Stourton; 1895–1965; 26th Baron Segrave, 23rd/25th Baron Mowbray, 22nd Baron Stourton	Bernard Fitzalan-Howard; 1908–1975; 16th Duke of Norfolk, 31st/24th/12th Earl of Arundel, 14th/16th Earl of Surrey (1917–1975)	Bernard Fitzalan-Howard; 1885–1972; 3rd Baron Howard of Glossop
Charles Edward Stourton; 1923–2006; 27th Baron Segrave, 24th/26th Baron Mowbray, 23rd Baron Stourton	Miles Fitzalan-Howard; 1915–2002; 17th Duke of Norfolk, 32nd/25th/13th Earl of Arundel, 15th/17th Earl of Surrey, 4th Baron Howard of Glossop (1975–2002)
Edward William Stephen Stourton; 1953–2021; 28th Baron Segrave, 25th/27th Baron Mowbray, 24th Baron Stourton	Edward Fitzalan-Howard b. 1956; 18th Duke of Norfolk, 33rd/26th/14th Earl of Arundel, 16th/18th Earl of Surrey, 5th Baron Howard of Glossop (from 2002)
James Charles Peter Stourton b. 1991; 29th Baron Segrave, 26th/28th Baron Mowbray, 25th Baron Stourton	Henry Fitzalan-Howard b. 1987 styled Earl of Arundel and Surrey

Military offices
Preceded by Thomas Pearson	General Officer Commanding 1st Division; 1963–1965	Succeeded by Richard Ward
Political offices
Preceded by The 16th Duke of Norfolk	Earl Marshal; 1975–2002	Succeeded by The 18th Duke of Norfolk
Peerage of England
Preceded by Bernard Marmaduke Fitzalan-Howard	Duke of Norfolk; 1975–2002	Succeeded by Edward Fitzalan-Howard
Preceded by Mona Fitzalan-Howard	Baron Beaumont; 1971–2002	Succeeded by Edward Fitzalan-Howard
Peerage of the United Kingdom
Preceded by Bernard Edward Fitzalan-Howard	Baron Howard of Glossop; 1972–2002	Succeeded by Edward Fitzalan-Howard
