= York Dominican Friary =

Former friary in North Yorkshire, England

York Dominican Friary was a friary in North Yorkshire, England.

== Burials ==
- Humphrey de Bohun, 4th Earl of Hereford
- Maud (or Matilda) de Balliol, wife of Bryan FitzAlan, Lord FitzAlan
- Sir Bryan Stapleton (grandson of Bryan Stapleton) and his wife Agnes Goddard Stapleton
- Lady Elizabeth Ferrers Greystoke
