= St Mary's Catholic Church, Carlton =

Church in North Yorkshire, England

Coordinates: 53°42′40″N 1°01′13″W

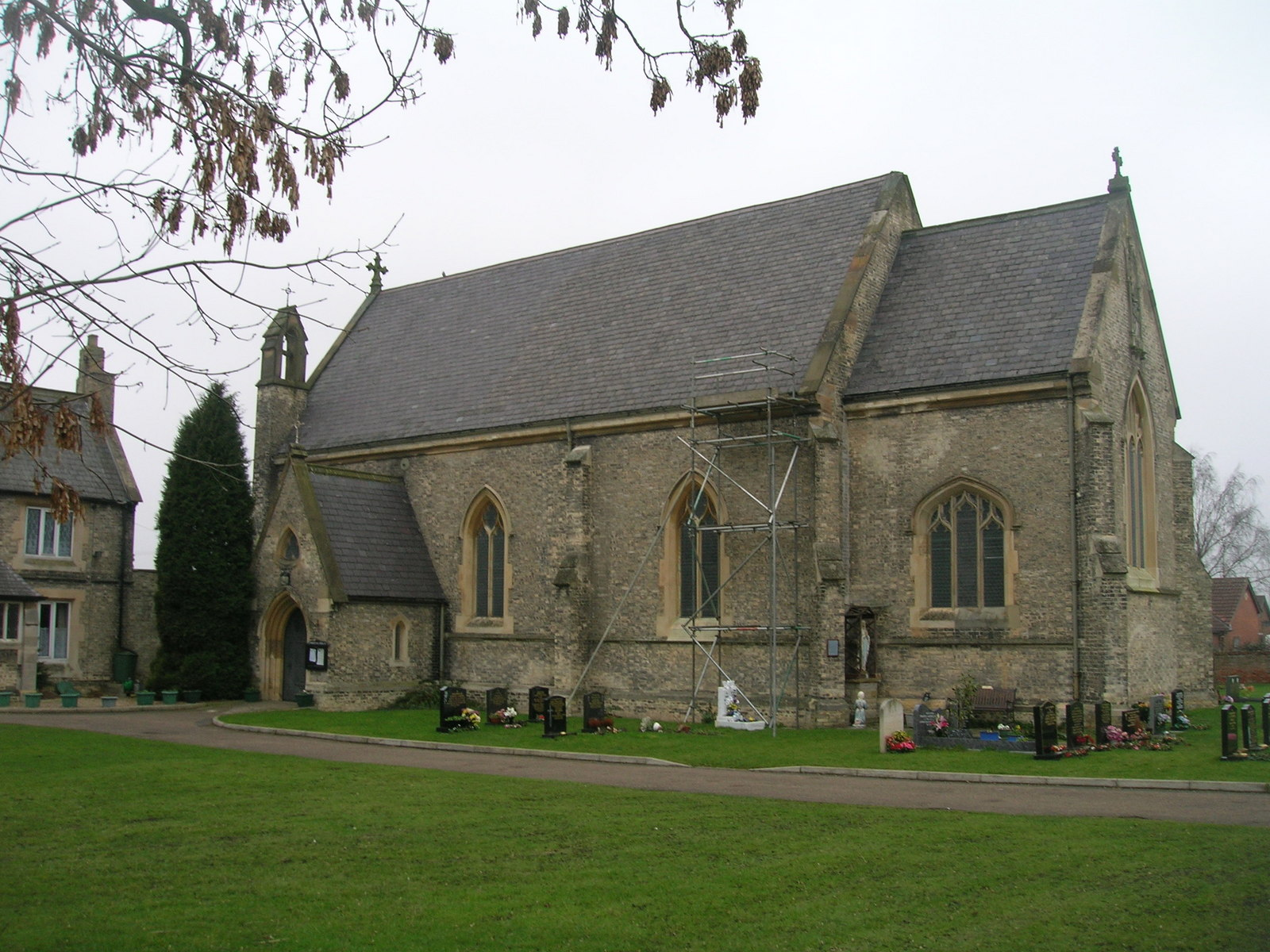
The church, in 2011

St Mary's Church is a Catholic parish church in Carlton, a village near Selby in North Yorkshire, in England.

Until the mid-19th century, Catholic worship took place in a chapel at what became Carlton Towers. In 1839, Miles Stapleton inherited the property, and decided to commission a Catholic chapel in the nearby village of Carlton. It was designed by M. E. Hadfield, and construction started in June 1841, with the first service in the new church taking place on 31 August 1842. The altar and reredos were added in about 1876, and side altars in 1904. The church was restored by Weightman & Brown in the 1980s, while the east end was reordered in 1992, with new sanctuary furniture installed. The church was Grade II* listed in 1993.

The church is built of white brick with stone dressings and Welsh slate roofs. It consists of a nave with a south porch, and a chancel with a north vestry. On the southwest corner is a gabled bellcote with a pointed arch. Above the three-light east window is a canopied niche. Inside the church are the original pews, and three chancel chairs made by Robert Thompson. Attached to the church by a brick link is a presbytery, also dating from 1842.

== See also ==
- Grade II* listed churches in North Yorkshire (district)
- Listed buildings in Carlton, Selby
