= Alastair Simms =

British cooper

Alastair David Simms (born 1963) is one of the last remaining master coopers in England.

== Early life ==
Simms grew up in the town of Masham in Yorkshire. He attended Masham CofE Primary School from 1968 to 1974 and Bedale High School from 1974 to 1979.

== Training ==
Simms began his apprenticeship in 1979, training at Theakston Brewery in Masham. He became a journeyman cooper in 1983. He attained the rank of master in 1994 when his apprentice completed his training, which is the requirement for mastery.

== Career ==
After leaving Theakston Brewery in 1995 he worked for eighteen years at Wadworth Brewery. In 2013 he set up his own business, the White Rose Cooperage Ltd, in Yorkshire.

Simms was involved in the 2015 film In the Heart of the Sea, providing barrels and other items, creating a cooperage on the set and being filmed working with other craftsmen. In August 2018 he took the position of Head Cooper at Yorkshire Cooperage. In October 2020 he took the position of Master Cooper for Jensen's Cooperage Ltd in Ripon. September 2025 he took the position of Head Cooper for Kingsborough Coopers of England in Thirsk.

Simms has appeared as an expert on the BBC television series The Repair Shop.

== See also ==
- Worshipful Company of Coopers
