= Carlton Towers =

English Grade I listed country house

Coordinates: 53.706589°N 1.017471°W

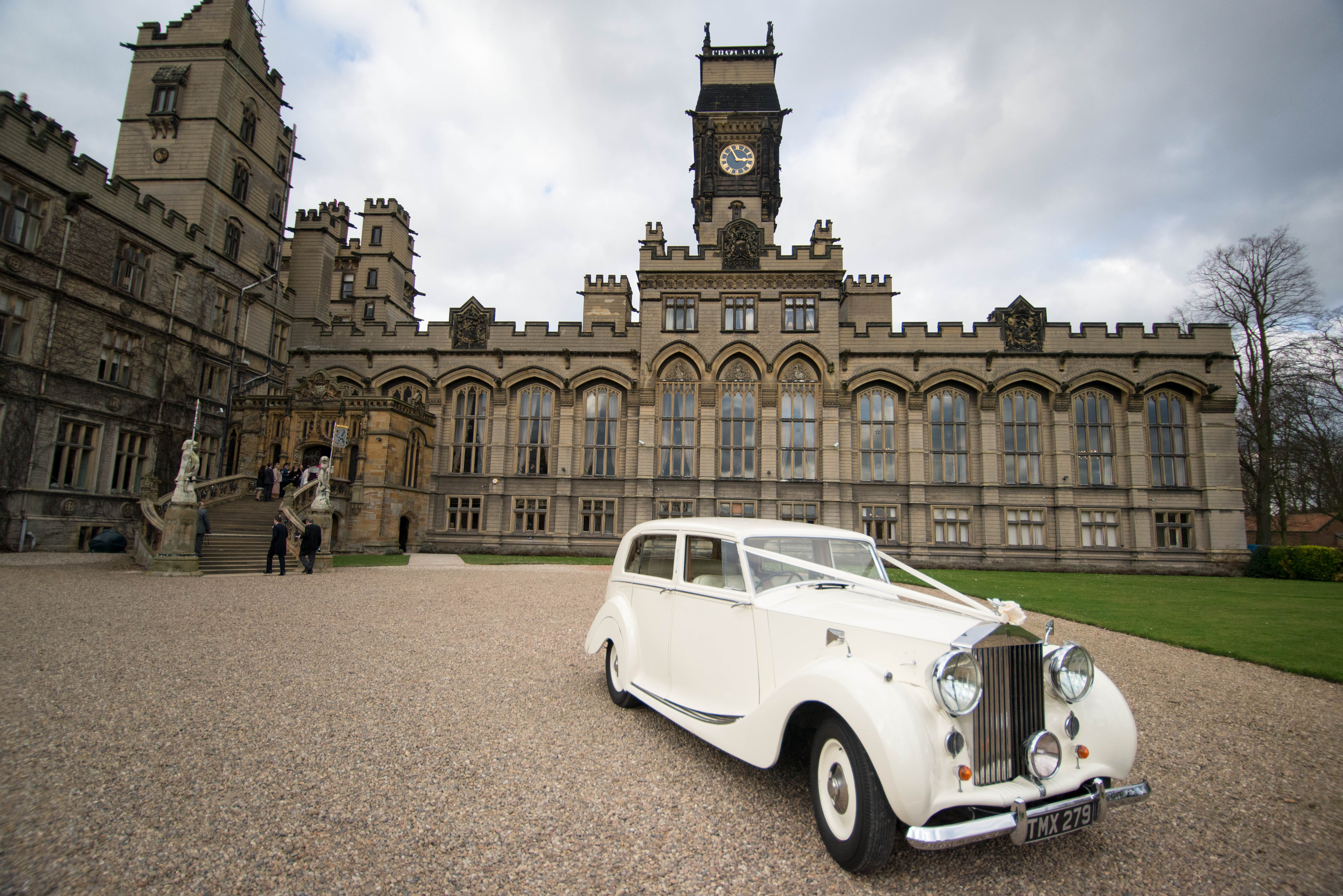
- Carlton Towers
- Interactive map of Carlton Towers
- Former names: Carlton Hall

General information
- Type: Country house
- Architectural style: Gothic Revival
- Location: Carlton, Selby, England
- Completed: 1614
- Renovated: 1770s and 1870s
- Owner: Lord Gerald Fitzalan-Howard; Lady Gerald Fitzalan-Howard

Technical details
- Floor count: 6

Design and construction
- Architects: Thomas Atkinson (1770s); Edward Welby Pugin (1870s)

Website
- carltontowers.co.uk

Carlton Towers in the civil parish of Carlton, 5 miles (8 km) south-east of Selby, North Yorkshire, England, is a Grade I listed country house, in the Gothic Revival style, and is surrounded by a 250-acre park.

The house was re-built to its present form in 1873–1875 by Henry Stapleton, 9th Baron Beaumont (1848–1892), whose father Miles Stapleton, 8th Baron Beaumont (1805–1854) had in 1840 inherited the title Baron Beaumont, in abeyance since 1507. His architect was Edward Welby Pugin, who "encased and incorporated" the earlier manor house dating from 1614 into a larger structure. He sold much of the estate to finance the building work. The 9th Baron died of pneumonia, without issue, and it passed to his younger brother the 10th Baron. The house is now the property of the 10th Baron's great-grandson Edward Fitzalan-Howard, 18th Duke of Norfolk, 13th Baron Beaumont (born 1956) of Arundel Castle in Sussex, who has allowed it to become the home of his younger brother, Lord Gerald Fitzalan-Howard (born 1962). The main parts of the house are available for hire for wedding receptions and other events.

== History ==
Arms of Stapleton (Argent, a lion rampant sable) quartering Errington (Argent, two bars and in chief three escallops azure), with a baron's coronet above, on a building called The Gables in the village of Carlton. Initials "HS", refer to Henry Stapleton, 9th Baron Beaumont (1848–1892), who was responsible for the extensive Victorian-Gothic enlargement 1873–75 of Carlton Towers. The French motto Mieux Sera signifies "It will be better"

It is known that there has been a house on the site from at least the 14th century, but nothing visible remains and there is no documentary record. The manor of Carlton was acquired by Nicholas Stapleton (1280–1343), eldest son of Miles de Stapleton (d.1314), killed at the Battle of Bannockburn, who was Steward of the Household to King Edward II. The family originated at the manor of Stapleton-on-Tees near Darlington in North Yorkshire. Carlton passed to Nicholas's nephew Sir Bryan Stapleton (c.1321–1394), a Knight of the Garter and Warden of Calais, younger brother and heir of Sir Miles Stapleton (c.1320–1372), of Bedale, Yorkshire, a founder Knight of the Garter. The last in the male line of Stapleton of Carlton was Sir Miles Stapleton, 1st Baronet (1628–1707), who died childless and left his estates to his nephew Nicholas Errington (d.1716) of Ponteland, Northumberland, who in accordance with the bequest adopted the name and arms of Stapleton. Nicholas's grandson, Thomas Stapleton (d.1821), succeeded in 1750 and in 1765 improved the house and estate, commissioning Thomas White to landscape the park and Thomas Atkinson of York to add the long East Wing, the clock above which shows the date 1777. Thomas was a keen breeder and trainer of horses and with Sir Thomas Gascoigne, 8th Baronet won the St. Leger Stakes in 1778 with Hollandaise and in his own right the following year with Tommy. In 1795 he made an unsuccessful claim to the title Baron Beaumont, abeyant since 1507, which he was in remainder to through his great-grandmother Mrs Anne Errington, sister of Sir Miles Stapleton, 1st Baronet, both descendants via a distant female line of John Beaumont, 1st Viscount Beaumont, 6th Baron Beaumont (d.1460), himself a descendant in the male line of John de Brienne (d.1237), King of Jerusalem, by his third wife, Berengaria of Leon, and thus a second cousin of King Edward II of England. His son Miles died without issue in 1707, when the estate passed to his first-cousin Thomas Stapleton (d.1839), whose son Miles Stapleton, 8th Baron Beaumont (1805–1854) in 1840 successfully obtained the abeyant title Baron Beaumont. The house was re-built to its present form in 1873-5 by his son Henry Stapleton, 9th Baron Beaumont (1848–1892), an officer in the British Army, who married Violet Marie Louise Wootton Isaacson, daughter of Frederick Wootton Isaacson. As he had no children his heir was his younger brother Miles Stapleton, 10th Baron Beaumont (1850–1895), an officer in the British Army, who married Mary Ethel Tempest, daughter and heiress of Sir Charles Henry Tempest, 1st Baronet (1834–1894) of Heaton, Bolton le Moors, Lancashire. He was killed in a shooting accident only three years later and was succeeded by his infant daughter, Mona Fitzalan-Howard, suo jure 11th Baroness Beaumont (1894–1971), who married Bernard Fitzalan-Howard, 3rd Baron Howard of Glossop, heir to the Dukedom of Norfolk.

Lady Beaumont owned Carlton until her death in 1971. During the Second World War the house was used as an auxiliary military hospital but was afterwards restored to its original condition. Her eldest son, Miles Francis Stapleton Fitzalan-Howard, 17th Duke of Norfolk, 12th Baron Beaumont (1915–2002), inherited both the Beaumont and Howard of Glossop baronies and in 1975 also succeeded his cousin as 17th Duke of Norfolk and Earl Marshal of England, with several other peerage titles and also inherited the Duke's estates including his principal seat of Arundel Castle in Sussex, which he made his home. After many years with no residents, Carlton Towers was re-occupied in 1990 by his second son Lord Gerald Fitzalan-Howard (born 1962) and his wife Lady Gerald Fitzalan-Howard.

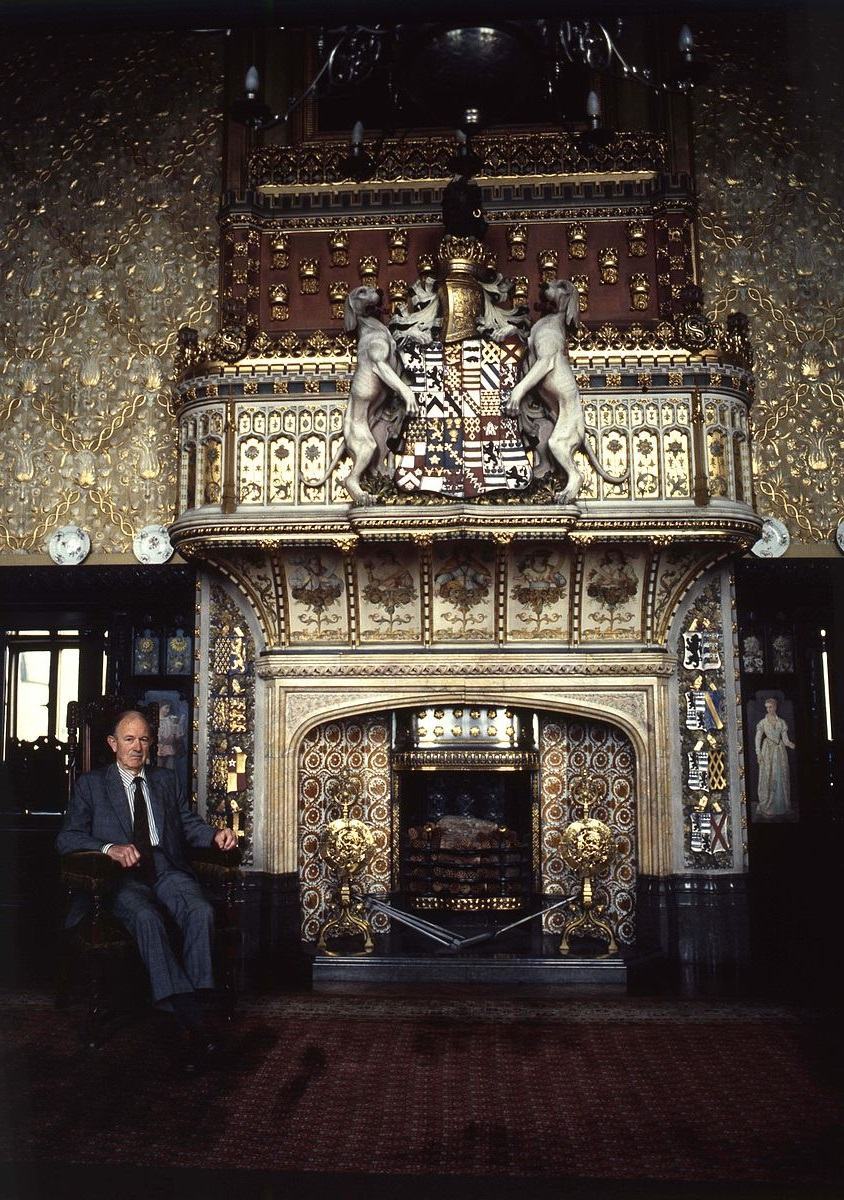
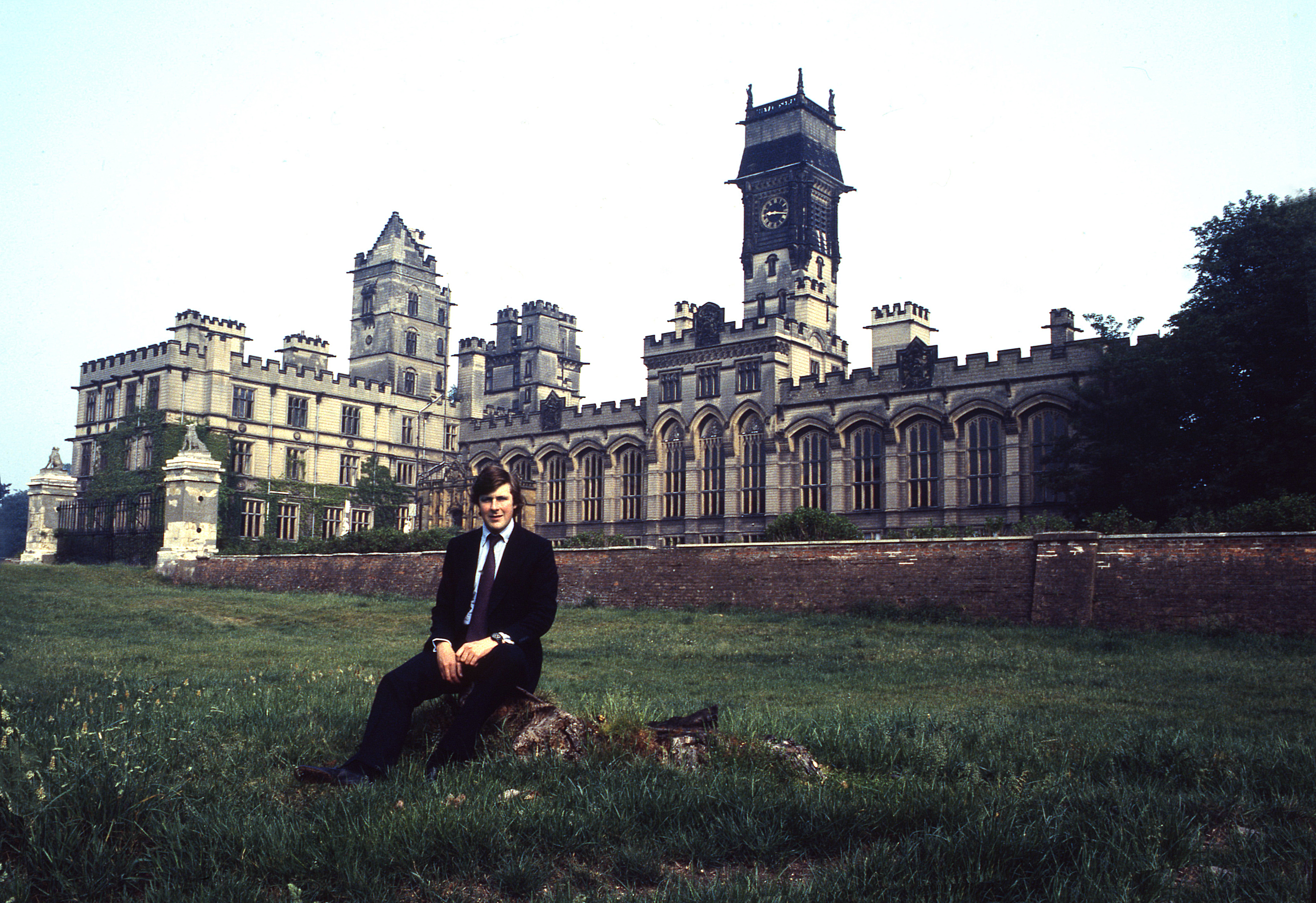
Miles Francis Stapleton Fitzalan-Howard 17th Duke of Norfolk, 12th Baron Beaumont (1915–2002) (father of the 18th Duke), in 1985 seated in the Venetian drawing room at Carlton Towers, before a Victorian heraldic chimneypiece showing the arms of the Beaumont, Stapleton and Errington families, with quarterings and impalements. In 1971 he inherited Carlton Towers and the title Baron Beaumont on the death of his mother Mona Stapleton, 11th Baroness Beaumont, whose paternal ancestor had changed his surname from Errington on inheriting the estate from his uncle Miles Stapleton, 1st Baronet (1626–1707) of Carlton, a descendant by a distant female line of John Beaumont, 1st Viscount Beaumont, 6th Baron Beaumont (d.1460) (left) Edward Fitzalan-Howard, Earl of Arundel and Surrey (the future 18th Duke of Norfolk and 13th Baron Beaumont) in 1981, aged 25, at Carlton Towers (right)

== In popular culture ==
The house has been used for filming, including: as "Hetton Abbey" for the 1988 film version of Evelyn Waugh's novel A Handful of Dust; a television show The Guest Wing (2012); Like Minds (2006); Micawber and The Darling Buds of May.

== See also ==
- Grade I listed buildings in North Yorkshire (district)
- Listed buildings in Carlton, Selby
- Arundel Castle in Sussex, which is the main seat of the Dukes of Norfolk
- Norfolk House, the former London residence of the Dukes of Norfolk
- Thomas Atkinson (architect), added long East Wing in 1765
- Thomas Stapleton, commissioned landscaping of the grounds

== Bibliography ==
- Colvin, Howard (1995). Biographical Dictionary of British Architects, 1600–1840. New Haven: Yale University Press. ISBN 0-14-020652-3.
- Sayer, Michael (1993). The Disintegration of a Heritage: Country Houses and their Collections, 1979–1992. Norfolk: Michael Russell (Publishing). ISBN 0-85-955197-0.
