= Lady Gerald Fitzalan-Howard =

English aristocrat

- Born: Emma Georgina Egerton Roberts; Mayfield and Five Ashes; East Sussex, England
- Spouse: Lord Gerald Fitzalan-Howard
- Children: 3
- Father: Desmond James Cecil Roberts
- Family: Howard (by marriage)

Emma Georgina Egerton Fitzalan-Howard (née Roberts), styled by courtesy as Lady Gerald Fitzalan-Howard, is an English aristocrat and the châtelaine of Carlton Towers.

== Biography ==
Fitzalan-Howard was born in Mayfield and Five Ashes, East Sussex, to middle-class parents. Her father, Desmond James Cecil Roberts, was a general practitioner. She moved to London when she was eighteen years old and began working for a recruitment company, eventually serving as an associate director.

She met Lord Gerald Fitzalan-Howard, the youngest son of Miles Fitzalan-Howard, 17th Duke of Norfolk and Anne Constable-Maxwell, at a wedding in 1988. Roberts married Lord Gerald in 1 December 1990. She and her husband have three children.

Through her marriage, she is a sister-in-law of the 18th Duke of Norfolk, Edward Fitzalan-Howard. As the wife of a younger son of a British duke, Roberts is styled in the feminine form of her husband's title, as Lady Gerald, and not with her own name, which is reserved for the daughters of high-ranking peers. In 1991, Lady Gerald and her husband moved from London to Carlton Towers, a country house in Carlton owned by the Howard family. She runs the estate alongside her husband. She had to sell off family property, including furniture, paintings, silverware, and family heirlooms, to raise over one million pounds to fund reconstruction on the house and open it up to tourists and for private events and filming. She remodeled the family's private apartments inside of Carlton Towers, and works as the furniture buyer and interior designer for reconstructive projects. In March 2014 she opened a cookery school at Carlton. As lady of the manor, Lady Gerald hosts guests at Carlton Towers for teas, dinners, and other events.

Lady Gerald was a regular cast member of the Sky Atlantic documentary reality television series Weekend Aristocrats, which featured working class and middle-class people staying at private country homes and engaging with members of the British nobility and gentry. The series was later screened on Netflix.
