= Lord Beaumont =

Lord Beaumont currently properly refers only to the Duke of Norfolk as holder of the English Barony of Beaumont (created by writ in 1309). However, in a historical context, it can refer either to a past holder of that Barony or to a holder of one of the extinct Viscountcies of Beaumont:

- Viscount Beaumont (Peerage of England - created 1432, extinct 1507)
- Viscount Beaumont, of Swords in the County of Dublin (Peerage of Ireland - created 1622, extinct 1702)

It is sometimes improperly used to describe Timothy Beaumont, Baron Beaumont of Whitley, a life peer, who is properly described only as Lord Beaumont of Whitley.
