= Gerald Maxwell =

British World War I flying ace (1895-1959)

- Born: Gerald Joseph Constable Maxwell; 8 September 1895; Beauly, Inverness, Scotland
- Died: 18 December 1959 (aged 64); Winchester, Hampshire, England
- Children: 6, including Anne
- Military career
- Allegiance: United Kingdom
- Branch: British Army; Royal Air Force
- Service years: 1914–1921; 1939–1945
- Rank: Wing Commander
- Units: Lovat Scouts; No. 56 Squadron RFC/RAF
- Conflicts: World War I • Gallipoli campaign • Western Front; World War II
- Awards: Distinguished Flying Cross; Military Cross; Air Force Cross

Gerald Joseph Constable Maxwell MC, DFC, AFC, DL (8 September 1895 – 18 December 1959) was a British First World War flying ace credited with twenty-six aerial victories.

== Background ==
Maxwell was born in Beauly near Inverness, Scotland, to the Honourable Bernard Constable-Maxwell (son of William Constable-Maxwell, 10th Lord Herries of Terregles) and the Honourable Alice Fraser (daughter of Simon Fraser, 13th Lord Lovat), both of whom were scions of notable Scottish recusant families. He was educated at Downside School.

== World War I service ==
Maxwell was commissioned in the Lovat Scouts on 4 August 1914 and fought at Gallipoli. He then served in Egypt before returning to the UK, where he transferred to the Royal Flying Corps in September 1916. Maxwell completed final pilot training at Central Flying School, Upavon and joined No. 56 Squadron in London Colney in March 1917. He was attached to 'A' Flight, commanded by Captain Albert Ball, flying SE5 aircraft. In April 1917, Maxwell's squadron was sent to France and he achieved a victory on his first patrol. Four days later he was hit by anti-aircraft fire and crashed unhurt.

On 26 July 1917, Maxwell was appointed a flight commander, by which time he had been credited with eight victories. He was awarded the Military Cross on 18 October and was posted back to the UK. After instructing at the School of Aerial Fighting at Turnberry, he returned to No. 56 Squadron, where in six weeks he claimed six more victories.

His confirmed 26 victories consisted of 12 enemy aircraft destroyed (including two shared wins), and 14 "out of control" victories, six of which were shared. In scoring the shared victories, he teamed with such other aces as Cecil Lewis, Edric Broadberry, Charles Jeffs, and Cyril Crowe.

Maxwell was granted a permanent commission as a captain in the Royal Air Force on 1 August 1919, relinquishing his commission in the 1st Lovat's Scouts, Territorial Force, the same day. On 29 August 1919 he was appointed a temporary Staff Officer, 3rd Class (Air), to serve at the Air Ministry. He was placed on the half-pay list between 1 February and 1 April 1920, and on 14 February 1921 resigned his permanent commission, and was granted the rank of major.

He later became a director of Maxwell-Chrysler Motors.

== World War II service ==
He was called up in the next war, becoming station commander at RAF Ford from 1941 to 1945. Maxwell was a member of the Royal Company of Archers, a Knight of Malta and Privy Chamberlain of the Pope. He was also a deputy lieutenant for Hampshire.

== Family and personal life ==
Maxwell married Carolyn Carden in 1920 and they had two sons and four daughters.

- Flight Lieutenant William Michael Constable Maxwell (17 September 1926 – 29 March 1950); killed during flying duty, unmarried.
- Ann Mary Teresa Constable Maxwell (30 August 1927 – 8 April 2013)); married The Honourable Miles Fitzalan-Howard (1915–2002) who became the 17th Duke of Norfolk in 1975, had five children, including the 18th Duke of Norfolk and actress Marsha Fitzalan.
- Veronica Diana Margaret Constable Maxwell (b. 15 December 1930); married with three children.
- Carolyn Mary Constable Maxwell (b. 23 August 1938); married to Major Count Charles John Fane de Salis (grandson of John Francis Charles, 7th Count de Salis-Soglio), four daughters.
- Rosemary Isabel Constable Maxwell (b. 21 August 1941); married with five children.
- Peter George Constable Maxwell (b. 18 January 1944); married with four children.

Maxwell died at Old Alresford House, Old Alresford, near Winchester on 18 December 1959 aged 64.

== Honours and awards ==
Military Cross
Captain Gerald Joseph Constable Maxwell, Yeomanry and R.F.C.

"For conspicuous gallantry and devotion to duty on many occasions. He has taken part in forty-three offensive patrols, in fourteen of which he acted as leader. He has destroyed at least three enemy aircraft, and driven down nine others completely out of control. He has consistently shown great skill in aerial combats, and his fearlessness and fine offensive spirit have been a splendid example to others."

Distinguished Flying Cross
Captain Gerald Joseph Constable Maxwell, M.C.

"This officer has at all times shown exceptional skill and gallantry and on numerous occasions has fought against greatly superior numbers. During the last six weeks he had brought down five enemy aeroplanes. Recently, he approached unobserved to within ten yards of three Fokker triplanes, one of which he shot down. He was chased for about nine miles by the remaining two until he met a formation of six Camels, these he led to attack some enemy aircraft, although he had only twenty-five minutes' petrol left."
