= Anne Fitzalan-Howard =

Anne Fitzalan-Howard may refer to:

- Anne Cowdrey, 14th Lady Herries of Terregles (1938–2014), née Fitzalan-Howard, British racehorse trainer and peeress
- Anne Fitzalan-Howard, Duchess of Norfolk (1927–2013) was a British peeress and humanitarian
