= Anne Fitzalan-Howard, Duchess of Norfolk =

British noblewoman

Her Grace The Duchess of Norfolk CBE
- Born: Anne Mary Teresa Constable-Maxwell; 30 August 1927
- Died: 8 April 2013 (aged 85)
- Spouse: Miles Fitzalan-Howard, 17th Duke of Norfolk (m. 1949)
- Issue Detail: Tessa Balfour, Countess of Balfour; Lady Carina Frost; Lady Marsha George; Edward Fitzalan-Howard, 18th Duke of Norfolk; Lord Gerald Bernard Fitzalan-Howard
- Father: Gerald Maxwell
- Mother: Caroline Carden

Anne Mary Teresa Fitzalan-Howard, Duchess of Norfolk, CBE (née Constable-Maxwell; 30 August 1927 – 8 April 2013) was a British peeress and humanitarian.

== Early life and family ==
Fitzalan-Howard was the eldest daughter of Wing Commander Gerald Maxwell, a Knight of Malta and Papal Chamberlain, and his American wife, Caroline Burns Carden. During the Blitz, she and her sisters were sent to the United States, spending most of the war years living with an aunt in New Jersey.

== Marriage ==
On 4 July 1949, she married the Hon. Miles Fitzalan-Howard, the eldest son of Bernard Fitzalan-Howard, 3rd Baron Howard of Glossop, and his wife, Mona. They had five children, two sons and three daughters.

- Lady Tessa Mary Isabel Fitzalan-Howard (born 20 September 1950), married Roderick Balfour, 5th Earl of Balfour; has issue, four daughters, one of whom is the playwright Lady Kinvara Balfour.
- Lady Carina Mary Gabrielle Fitzalan-Howard (born 20 February 1952), married Sir David Frost; has issue, including Wilfred Frost.
- Lady Marcia Mary Josephine Fitzalan-Howard (born 10 March 1953), better known as the actress Marsha Fitzalan, married Patrick Ryecart (marriage dissolved); has issue.
- Edward Fitzalan-Howard, 18th Duke of Norfolk (b. 2 December 1956), married Georgina Susan Gore, has issue.
- Lord Gerald Bernard Fitzalan-Howard (born 13 June 1962), married Emma Roberts; has issue. He has resided with his family at Carlton Towers since 1991.

In 1971, her husband inherited the barony of Beaumont from his mother, making her Lady Beaumont. In 1972, her husband inherited his father's barony. She continued to be known as Lady Beaumont, as the Beaumont barony was the senior of the two baronies. He inherited his cousin's dukedom of Norfolk in 1975 and she became the Duchess of Norfolk. In 1992, the duchess was appointed CBE for her work as founder and co-chair of Help the Hospices.

== Ancestry ==
Ancestors of Anne Fitzalan-Howard, Duchess of Norfolk

8. William Constable-Maxwell, 10th Lord Herries of Terregles
4. Hon. Bernard Constable-Maxwell
9. Marcia Mary Vavasour
2. Major Gerald Joseph Constable-Maxwell
10. Simon Fraser, 13th Lord Lovat
5. Alice Mary Charlotte Fraser
11. Alice Mary Weld-Blundell
1. Anne Fitzalan Howard, Duchess of Norfolk
12. Moses White Carden
6. George Alexander Carden
13. Salena Dunn
3. Caroline Burns Carden
14. George Getz Shumard
7. Carrie Burns Shumard
15. Isabella Clark Atkinson
