= Stapleton baronets of Carlton (1662) =

Extinct baronetcy in the Baronetage of England

Stapleton baronets
- Escutcheon of the Stapleton baronets of Carlton
- Creation date: 1662
- Status: extinct
- Extinction date: 1707
- Arms: Argent, a lion rampant sable

The Stapleton baronetcy, of Carlton, Yorkshire, was created on 20 March 1661/2 Old Style for Miles Stapleton (1626–1707), the son of Gilbert Stapleton of Carlton.

== Background ==
Miles Stapleton or Stapylton was the nephew of the writer Robert Stapylton.

The Stapletons were recusants. Stapleton was tried in Yorkshire at the time of the Popish Plot fabrication, and acquitted by the jury.

He was heir in his issue to the ancient title Baron Beaumont, in abeyance from the death of William Beaumont, 2nd Viscount Beaumont, 7th Baron Beaumont (bef. 1441–1507). Carlton had been a possession of the Stapletons since about 1300. The 1st Baronet was descended from Sir Bryan Stapleton (c.1322–1394).

== Stapleton baronets, of Carlton (1662) ==
- Miles Stapleton, 1st Baronet (1626–1707)

He married twice but died without issue, when the baronetcy became extinct.

== Extended family ==
His heir was his nephew Nicholas Errington (d.1716) of Ponteland, Northumberland, who adopted the surname and arms of Stapleton. The Stapleton residence, Carlton Hall (now Carlton Towers) was improved in the 18th century by Thomas Atkinson. It became the seat of Miles Stapleton, 8th Baron Beaumont.

== See also ==
- Stapleton baronets
