= Old Alresford House =

Country house in Old Alresford, England

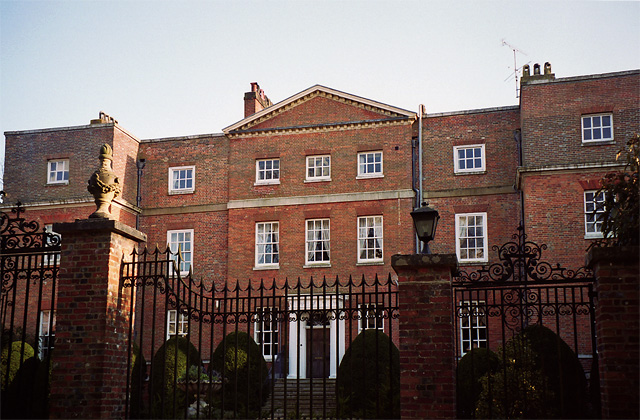
- Old Alresford House

- Location within Hampshire

General information
- Type: Country House
- Architectural style: Georgian
- Location: Old Alresford, Winchester, Hampshire
- Coordinates: 51°05′57″N 1°09′37″W
- Completed: 1751

Technical details
- Material: Brick with slate roof

Design and construction
- Architect: William Jones
- Designations: Grade II* listed (house); Grade II listed (park)

Old Alresford House is an 18th-century Georgian country house in Old Alresford, Hampshire, England. It is a Grade II* listed building.

It was built between 1749 and 1751 for Admiral Lord Rodney on a gently sloping south facing site between the village churchyard and Alresford Pond, paid for by the riches accrued in a successful naval career fighting the French in the Caribbean.

The house is constructed of brick with Bath stone dressings and slated roofs in 3 storeys and a basement. It has a 7-bay frontage with the central 3 bays slightly projecting. There are single bay flanking wings at each end with single storey service wings on both sides at the front forming a courtyard.

Rodney purchased Alresford Pond in 1755 before commissioning Richard Woods to create the 16 ha (40 acres) park in 1764, which is itself now Grade II listed.

== History ==
Old Alresford (pronounced Allsford) had belonged to the Bishop of Winchester for over a thousand years. During the mid-12th century, Bishop Godfrey de Lucy, built the 350 m (1,150 ft) long Great Weir to create a balancing lake, known as Alresford Pond, for the Itchen Navigation. Admiral Rodney's house was built on the site of an old manor house owned by the Norton family.

Unfortunately Rodney got into unrelated financial difficulties and was forced to move to France to escape his creditors. His son George took over the estate, but the debts were repaid and the Admiral was able to return home.

Old Alresford House passed down in the Rodney family for three generations until it was sold in 1870 to William Whitear Bulpitt, a banker. His family kept possession of the property until 1926, when it was sold to C. F. G. R. Schwerdt, an art collector. He died in 1931 and his mausoleum stands in the churchyard. The house then passed to Wing Commander Gerald and Mrs. Constable Maxwell. Maxwell was a highly decorated World War I fighter pilot who is also buried in the neighbouring churchyard. After his death in 1959 his family stayed on at the house.

In 1990 the property was acquired by Peter and Gayle MacDermott.
