= Charles Jeffs =

British flying ace

Charles Hubert Jeffs
- Born: 11 July 1895; Holton-le-Clay, Lincolnshire, England
- Died: 1974 (aged 79); Romsey, Hampshire
- Military career
- Allegiance: United Kingdom
- Branch: British Army; Royal Air Force
- Service years: 1916–1949
- Rank: Major
- Units: Border Regiment; No. 56 Squadron RFC
- Conflicts: World War I • Western Front; World War II
- Awards: Military Cross

Major Charles Hubert Jeffs (Note: Listed in some sources as Charles Hugh Jeffs.) MC (11 July 1895 – 1974) was a British World War I flying ace credited with five aerial victories.

== Military service ==
Jeffs was trained in the Inns of Court Officers' Training Corps. On 8 June 1916 he was commissioned as a second lieutenant (on probation) in the 5th Battalion, Border Regiment, Territorial Force. He was later seconded to the Royal Flying Corps, trained as a pilot, and was appointed a flying officer on 14 June 1917.

Jeffs was posted to No. 56 Squadron RFC on 18 August 1917. Only four days later, he scored his first kill, flying Royal Aircraft Factory SE.5a No. B524 to destroy an Albatros D.V. In the same aircraft, he tallied four more wins, with the last one coming on 29 September; shared with fellow ace Gerald J. C. Maxwell and five other pilots. On 5 October, Jeffs fell beneath the guns of Bruno Loerzer as the German's eleventh victim. Jeffs survived, but was captured. On 8 December 1917, while a prisoner, Jeffs was promoted to lieutenant in the Border Regiment.

Jeffs was held as a POW until after the armistice in November 1918, then returned to Royal Air Force service, until transferred to the unemployed list on 19 October 1919. On 7 July 1920 Jeffs relinquished his RAF commission, and returned to serve in the 5th Bn., Border Regiment.

Jeffs served in the Border Regiment during the Second World War with the war substantive rank of captain. On 12 March 1949, having exceeded the age limit, he relinquished his army commission, and was granted the honorary rank of major.

Jeffs, alongside two other men of the same surname, is listed on the "Roll of Honour" – men from the village who served in the First World War – at St. Peter's Church, Holton-le-Clay.
