= Edric Broadberry =

British flying ace

Edric William Broadberry
- Born: 14 December 1894; Middlesex, England
- Died: 26 December 1967 (aged 73)
- Military career
- Allegiance: United Kingdom
- Branch: British Army; Royal Air Force
- Service years: 1914–1947
- Rank: Group Captain
- Units: Essex Regiment; Royal Flying Corps
- Commands: No. 56 Squadron RFC
- Conflicts: World War I World War II
- Awards: Military Cross
- Other work: Technical Branch of Royal Air Force

Group Captain Edric William Broadberry MC (14 December 1894 – 26 December 1967) was a British pilot. He began his military career during World War I. During that conflict, he would become a flying ace credited with eight confirmed aerial victories. He remained in service throughout World War II, and served his nation for 33 years, not retiring until 1947.

== Early life ==
Broadberry was born on 14 December 1894 in Middlesex, England. He was the son of Arthur Edward Broadbery, gas works manager of Southend and later Tottenham and Amy Lucy Dubois, and the grandson of William Henry Hague Broadberry, a gas engineer, originally of North Collingham, Nottinghamshire.

== World War I ==
Broadberry's initial military service was with the Essex Regiment in the Gallipoli campaign. He had been raised to a temporary captaincy on 27 May 1914; on 16 March 1916, he surrendered his temporary captaincy upon leaving his posting within the regiment. On 30 May 1916, he was promoted to captain. He learned to fly at Aboukir, Egypt.

On 8 November 1916, Broadberry was seconded to the Royal Flying Corps as a Flying Officer. He returned to England, and was posted to combat duty in France with 56 Squadron on 20 April 1917 as a Royal Aircraft Factory SE.5a pilot. He scored his first aerial victory on 12 May 1917; he ran his tally to eight by 11 July. The following day, he was removed from action by being hit in the leg while being shot down.

As a reward for his exploits, he was awarded the Military Cross on 1 January 1918.

== List of aerial victories ==
Confirmed victories are numbered and listed chronologically. Unconfirmed victories are denoted by "u/c".

No.	Date/time	Aircraft	Foe	Result	Location	Notes
1	12 May 1917 @ 0845 hours	Royal Aircraft Factory SE.5a serial number A8903	Albatros D.III	Destroyed	East of Lens	Victory shared with Gerald J. C. Maxwell
2	20 May 1917 @ 1410 hours	Royal Aircraft Factory SE.5a s/n A8903	Albatros D.III	Driven down out of control	Guesnain, France	
3	23 May 1917 between 1900 and 1015 hours	Royal Aircraft Factory SE.5a s/n A8903	Albatros D.III	Driven down out of control	Aubigny, France	Victory shared with Philip B. Prothero
4	26 May 1917 @ 1930 hours	Royal Aircraft Factory SE.5a s/n A8903	German two-seater	Driven down out of control	Gouy-sous-Bellonne, France	
5	27 May 1917 between 1900 and 2000 hours	Royal Aircraft Factory SE.5a s/n A8903	Albatros D.III	Driven down out of control	East of Bugnicourt	
6	7 June 1917 between 0850 and 0940 hours	Royal Aircraft Factory SE.5a s/n A8918	German two-seater	Destroyed	Poelcappelle, France	
7	7 June 1917 between 0850 and 0940 hours	Royal Aircraft Factory SE.5a s/n A8918	German two-seater	Driven down out of control	Ledegem, Belgium	
8	11 July 1917 @ 1930 hours	Royal Aircraft Factory SE.5a s/n A8918	German two-seater	Driven down out of control	Houthulst Wood, Belgium	
u/c	11 July 1917					

== Post World War I ==
Broadberry remained in the newly formed Royal Air Force after the First World War and made a career of it. On 1 August 1919, he granted a permanent commission in the reorganized Royal Air Force as a flying officer.

Quite some years of his career passed unnoticed; however, in 1936, he was a squadron leader at the Air Observers School at North Coates. On 1 April 1937, he was promoted from squadron leader to wing commander.

On 24 April 1940, in the early stages of World War II, Wing Commander Broadberry transferred duty to the Technical Branch of the RAF. On 1 December 1941, he was promoted to temporary group captain. His temporary appointment as group captain did not cease until well after war's end, on 1 November 1947. On 21 December 1947, Broadberry retired, keeping the rank of group captain in his retirement.

Broadberry died early on 26 December 1967.
