= Challoner Club =

London gentlemen's club

Coordinates: 51.4977°N 0.1625°W

The Challoner Club
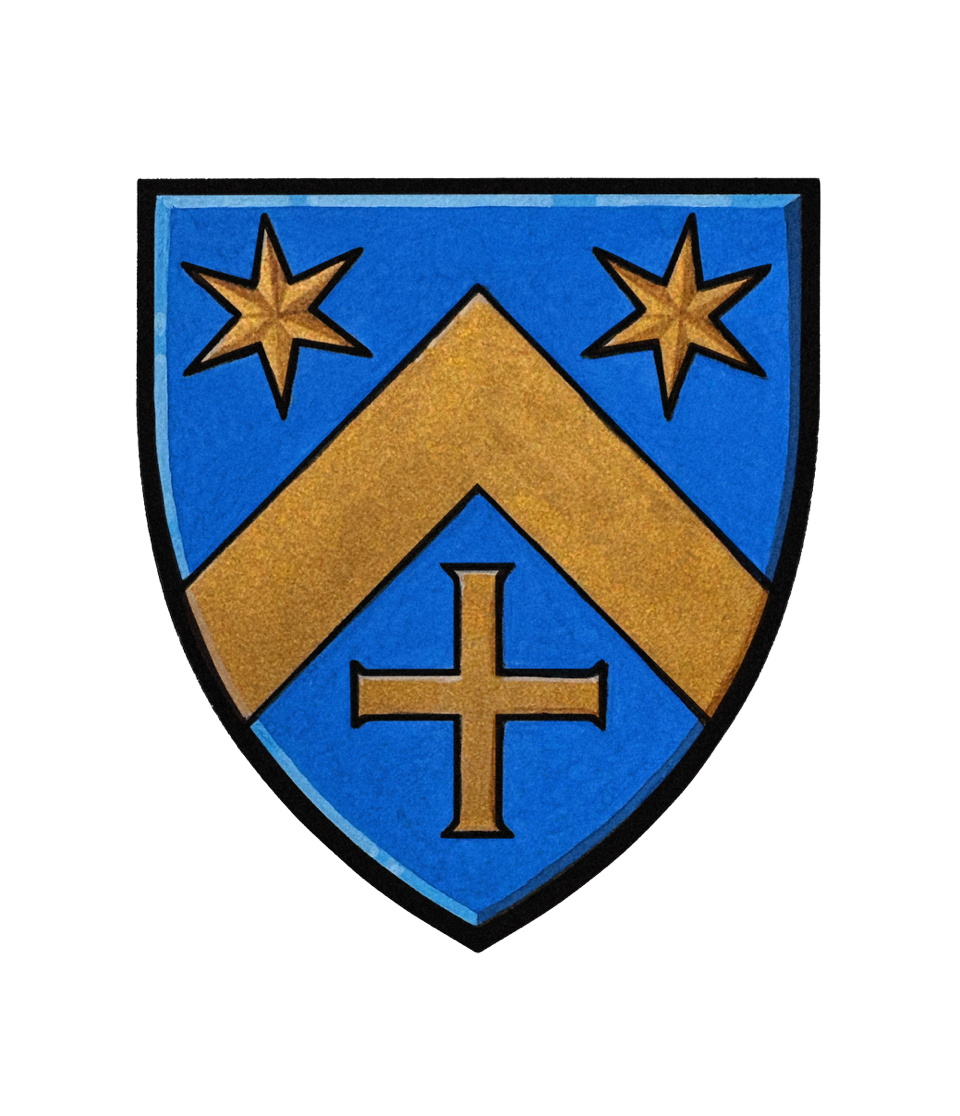
- Formation: 1949 (Refounded 2025)
- Location: London, United Kingdom
- Chairman: Ben Fowler
- Deputy Chair: Caitlin Farrell
- Club Chaplain: Rev. Fr. Christian de Lisle
- Website: https://www.thechallonerclub.org/home

The Challoner Club is a London-based private members' club for Roman Catholics. It was founded as a gentlemen's club in 1949, closed in 1997, and reopened as a social club without permanent premises in 2025.

The club takes its name from Richard Challoner (1691–1781), who served as Catholic Vicar Apostolic of the London District for much of the 18th century.

The original club was based at 59 Pont Street in Knightsbridge, and hosted the library of the Irish Genealogical Research Society.

In 2025, the club was re-established as a private members' social club, with no permanent location, by Calder Claydon, alongside a group of Catholic laity assisted by a priest of the Archdiocese of Westminster. In February 2026, Georgina, Duchess of Norfolk joined the club as their first Patron.
