= Irish Genealogical Research Society =

Organisation with archive of Irish genealogical material

- Irish Genealogical Research Society logo
- Abbreviation: IGRS
- Formation: 1936
- Headquarters: London
- Members: 1,000
- Website: irishancestors.ie

The Irish Genealogical Research Society (IGRS) is a learned society established on 15 September 1936. It was founded in London by a group of expatriates from Ireland, led the Reverend Wallace G. Clare, as a direct response to the conflagration of 1922, which saw the almost complete destruction of the contents of the Public Record Office of Ireland (situated in the Four Courts) by fire and explosion at the height of Ireland's Civil War. The IGRS' stated aim was to build up a library and archive of Irish genealogical material to offset the loss of 1922, and doing so remains the society's chief aim.

The IGRS is a UK-registered charity, based in London, and was the earliest society founded to promote the pursuit of Irish genealogical research. The IGRS library is the largest private collection of Irish genealogical material outside of Ireland.

== History ==
Acquisitions of genealogical material were first stored at Gray's Inn, London, before being transferred to Thornton College, Bletchley, Buckinghamshire, during World War II. Subsequently the library was installed in the Challoner Club until 1997, then at the Irish Club in Eaton Square, before moving to its current, temporary, home at the Society of Genealogists in London.

== Membership ==
The Ireland Branch of the IGRS was founded in 1967 and has become a major part of the organisation. Membership is open to all applicants who have an interest in Irish ancestry and it has typically ranged between 500 and 1100 over recent decades.

== Publications ==
The IGRS produces an annual print publication (originally semi-annual), The Irish Genealogist, comprising field-work research and scholarly articles of Irish family history. Fourteen volumes have been published, with the 15th currently being issued to the membership in the usual six parts.

During the 1980s, a newsletter was started, continuing today in an electronic form.

== See also ==
- Council of Irish Genealogical Organisations
