= Listed buildings in Killerby, North Yorkshire =

Killerby is a civil parish in the county of North Yorkshire, England. It contains two listed buildings that are recorded in the National Heritage List for England. Both the listed buildings are designated at Grade II, the lowest of the three grades, which is applied to "buildings of national importance and special interest", and they consist of a farmhouse and a stable block.

== Buildings ==
| Name and location | Photograph | Date | Notes |
|---|---|---|---|
| Hook Car Hill Farmhouse; 54.35731°N 1.57943°W | — | Late 18th century | The farmhouse is in red brick, with dentilled eaves, and a stone slate roof with stone coping and shaped kneelers. There are two storeys and three bays. The central doorway has an architrave and a double keystone, and the windows are sashes with flat stuccoed arches. |
| Stable block, Killerby Hall; 54.35958°N 1.60295°W | — | 1788 | The stable block is in stone with yellow brick dressings, quoins, and hipped roofs of pantile and asbestos. It consists of four ranges around a courtyard, the main front with nine bays, the outer and central bays with two storeys and the others with one storey. In the centre is a round-arched carriage entrance with imposts and an initialled and dated keystone. Above it is a blocked Diocletian window, and on the roof is a pyramidal roof with a dovecote cupola. The other bays contain doorways with fanlights and windows in round arches with keystones. |
