= Listed buildings in Carlton, Selby =

Carlton is a civil parish in the former Selby district of North Yorkshire, England. It contains twelve listed buildings that are recorded in the National Heritage List for England. Of these, one is listed at Grade I, the highest of the three grades, one is at Grade II*, the middle grade, and the others are at Grade II, the lowest grade. The parish contains the village of Carlton and the surrounding area. The most important building in the parish is Carlton Towers, a country house that is listed together with associated structures in the gardens and grounds. The other listed buildings are houses, cottages, farmhouses, and two churches.

== Key ==
Grade	Criteria
I	Buildings of exceptional interest, sometimes considered to be internationally important
II*	Particularly important buildings of more than special interest
II	Buildings of national importance and special interest

== Buildings ==
Name and location	Photograph	Date	Notes	Grade
Carlton Towers; 53.70656°N 1.01723°W		1614	A country house that has been much altered and extended, notably by Thomas Atkinson in about 1770 and by E. W. Pugin in 1873–75, and the interior was designed by J. F. Bentley between 1875 and 1890. It is built in pinkish-orange brick with some render, and has an approximately L-shaped plan. The main range has a three-storey three-bay block, flanked by two-storey five-bay wings, and a central clock tower. To the west is a range with three storeys, five bays, a three-storey over with a staircase tower, and an octagonal turret. A curving flight of steps lead to an entrance in the angle, flanked by Talbots holding banners. The doorway have Tudor arches rising to pinnacles, over which is a datestone. Most of the windows are mullioned and transomed in moulded architraves.	I
Manor Farmhouse; 53.70613°N 1.02063°W	—	Early 18th century	The farmhouse is in reddish-brown brick with a three-course floor band, the upper band moulded, and a hipped pantile roof. There are two storeys and three bays. The doorway has a fanlight, and the windows are casements, the window to the right of door with a flat arch of rubbed brick.	II
Drakes House; 53.70722°N 1.02078°W	—	Mid to late 18th century	The house is in pinkish-brown brick, with a modillion eaves band, and a tile roof with stone coping and kneelers. There are two storeys, three bays and a rear outshut under a catslide roof. In the centre is a doorway, and the windows are sashes. The openings on the front have painted rubbed brick flat arches, and at the rear they have elliptical arches.	II
Pair of houses adjoining Grove Cottage; 53.70756°N 1.02056°W	—	Mid to late 18th century	The houses, later combined, are in reddish-orange brick, with painted red brick dressings, a modillion eaves cornice, and a swept pantile roof with brick coping. In the centre are paired doorways, the right one blocked, the windows are sashes, and the openings have flat arches of rubbed brick.	II
Folly south of Carlton Towers; 53.70273°N 1.01928°W		c. 1770	The folly was designed by Thomas Atkinson, and is in pinkish-brown brick with stone dressings. It has a square plan, a single bay, two stepped storeys, projecting bands, and clasping pilasters on the corners. The openings have pointed heads, and on each storey are coped battlements.	II
Gate piers and railings 20 metres southwest of Carlton Towers; 53.70364°N 1.02092°W		c. 1770	The gate piers are in magnesian limestone, and the railings are in cast iron. There are end piers, and curved railings linking with the pedestrian and carriage gates. The piers have a circular plan, they are channelled, and have fluted urn finials. The outer gate piers each has a moulded plinth with a frieze and paterae, and those flanking the carriage entrance have square plinths with festoons.	II
Stapleton Lodge; 53.70652°N 1.02031°W		Late 18th century	The house is in brick, mostly rendered, and has a swept tile roof with stone coping. There are two storeys and three bays. The central doorway has an architrave, with engaged Doric columns, a fanlight, a frieze and a dentilled hood.	II
St Mary's Church (Roman Catholic); 53.71120°N 1.02029°W		1840–42	The church, designed by M. E. Hadfield, is built in white brick with stone dressings and Welsh slate roofs. It consists of a nave with a south porch, and a chancel with a north vestry. On the southwest corner is a gabled bellcote with a pointed arch. Above the three-light east window is a canopied niche.	II*
St Mary's Church (Anglican); 53.70883°N 1.02094°W		1862–63	The church is built in sandstone with Welsh slate roofs, and consists of a nave, a south porch, a chancel, a north vestry and a southwest steeple, and is in Gothic Revival style. The steeple has a tower with two stages, angle buttresses, a stair turret, tall two-light bell openings, and an octagonal broach spire with a clock face.	II
Gates, railings and piers 8 metres south of Carlton Towers; 53.70617°N 1.01708°W	—	c. 1875	The gate piers at the entrance to the forecourt are in stone, the gates and railings are in cast iron, and they were designed by E. W. Pugin. The piers have a square plan, and are about 3 metres (9.8 ft) high. Each pier has a stepped base, a plain shaft and a moulded cornice surmounted by hound seated on a plinth.	II
9–15 High Street; 53.70668°N 1.02072°W		1877	A row of four estate workers' cottages designed by J. F. Bentley. They are in reddish-brown brick with a stepped band and a tile roof. There is a single storey, and each cottage has one gabled bay. The doorways are paired and recessed under elliptical arches flanked by pilaster strips. The windows are casements, and in the upper floor they are paired with ornate plaster plaques between them.	II
The Gables; 53.70657°N 1.02068°W		1877	An estate worker's house, designed by J. F. Bentley, in reddish-brown brick, with a band, and a tile roof with brick coping and kneelers. There is a single storey and attics, an L-shaped plan, and one gabled bay on each side. On the entrance front is a porch, the windows are casements, and on the front facing the road is an inscribed plaque.	II
