= Holy Family Catholic High School, Carlton =

Holy Family Catholic High School
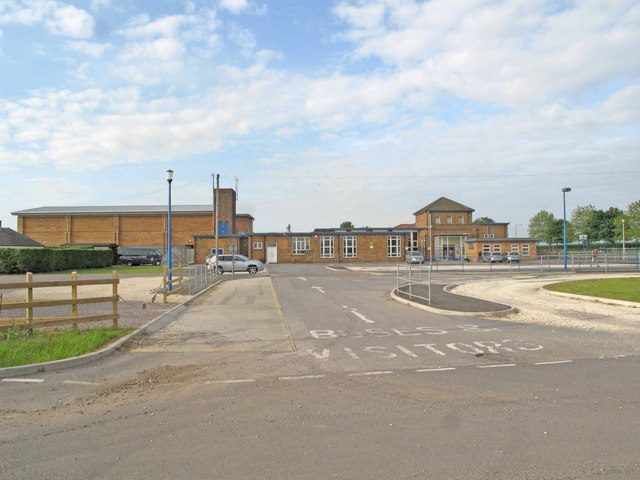
- The school seen from Longhedge Lane (2009)

Location
- Longhedge Lane; Carlton; North Yorkshire, DN14 9NS; England; 53.7148°N 1.0179°W

Information
- Type: Academy
- Motto: "To Grow in Wisdom and Grace"
- Religious affiliation: Roman Catholic
- Established: 1967
- Closed: 2025
- Local authority: North Yorkshire Council
- Trust: Bishop Konstant Catholic Academy Trust
- Department for Education URN: 148167 Tables
- Ofsted: Reports
- Headteacher: Donna Mitchell
- Gender: Coeducational
- Age: 11 to 16
- Enrolment: 298
- Capacity: 450
- Houses: Hinsley, Howard, , Beaumont, Newman
- Website: http://www.holyfamilycarlton.org/

Holy Family Catholic High School was a coeducational Roman Catholic secondary school located in Carlton in the county of North Yorkshire, England.

== History ==
The school was founded in 1967.

Previously a voluntary aided school administered by North Yorkshire County Council, in March 2021 Holy Family Catholic High School converted to academy status. The school is now sponsored by the Bishop Konstant Catholic Academy Trust.

At some point the school motto changed its wording from "To Increase in Wisdom and Grace". To "Grow in Wisdom and Grace".

In September 2024, the school announced that it would close at the end of the 2024/25 academic year.

== Structure ==
The school has capacity for 450 pupils. Currently 298 pupils attend the school. However, since the school announced closure in October 2024, the pupil number has decreased significantly and will be entirely depreciated by the end of the academic year.

The school offers GCSEs and Cambridge Nationals as programmes of study for pupils.

== Performance ==
As of 2025, the school was rated as "Requires Improvement" by Ofsted in its most recent three inspections. Only 8% of students achieve the English Baccalaureate, compared with 43% of students in the Local Authority Area as a whole. However, performance in core GCSEs is in line with the local average, with 46% of Holy Family pupils achieving grade 5 or above in their English and maths GCSEs compared with 47% in the Local Authority.
