= Killerby, North Yorkshire =

Civil parish in North Yorkshire, England

Coordinates: 54.361°N 1.599°W

Killerby
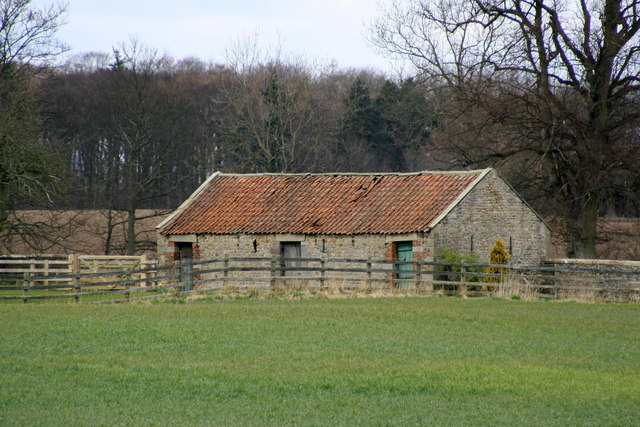
- Barn at Killerby

- Location within North Yorkshire
- Population: 10
- OS grid reference: SE260963
- Civil parish: Killerby
- Unitary authority: North Yorkshire
- Ceremonial county: North Yorkshire
- Region: Yorkshire and the Humber
- Country: England
- Sovereign state: United Kingdom
- Post town: RICHMOND
- Postcode district: DL10
- Police: North Yorkshire
- Fire: North Yorkshire
- Ambulance: Yorkshire

Killerby is a civil parish in the county of North Yorkshire, England, 2 miles (3 km) south east of the village of Catterick. It consists of a few scattered houses and farms, with an estimated population in 2013 of only 10. There is no modern village in the parish.

Killerby was mentioned in the Domesday Book (as Chilvordebi), when it was a berewick to Catterick. In 1291 Bryan FitzAlan, lord of Bedale, was granted a licence to crenellate his house at Killerby. The foundations of the castle can still be traced. A hunting lodge was later built nearby, and its stable block built in 1788 survives. Killerby Hall, an impressive country house was built in 1906 on the site.

Killerby was a township in the ancient parish of Catterick in the North Riding of Yorkshire, and became a separate civil parish in 1866. From 1974 to 2023 it was part of the Hambleton District, it is now administered by the unitary North Yorkshire Council.

== See also ==
- Listed buildings in Killerby, North Yorkshire
