= St Mary's Anglican Church, Carlton =

Church in Carlton, North Yorkshire, England

Coordinates: 53°42′32″N 1°01′15″W

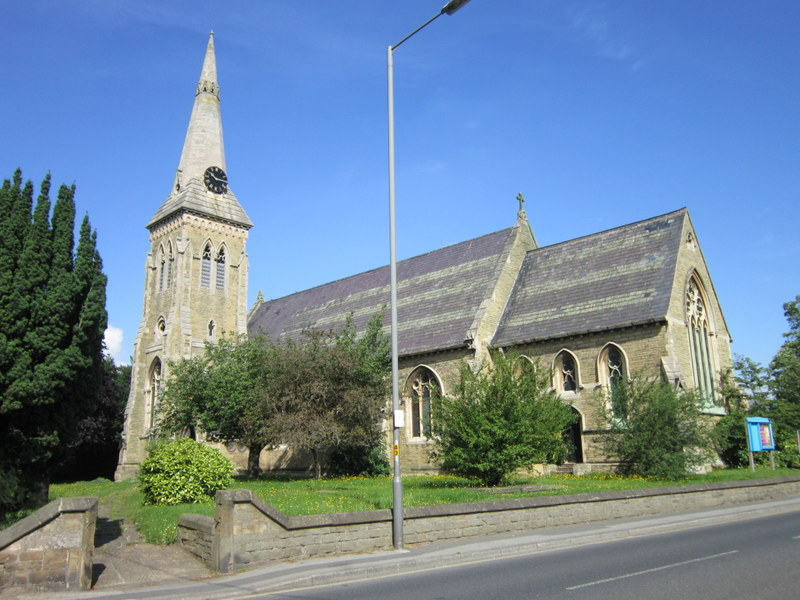
The church, in 2012

St Mary's Church is an Anglican parish church in Carlton, a village near Selby in North Yorkshire, in England.

The first church in Carlton was a wooden chapel of ease to St Laurence's Church, Snaith, built in 1379. In 1861, Carlton was granted its own parish, and work commenced on a new building, completed in 1866. It was designed by J. B. Atkinson, and was partly funded by Isabella Anne Stapleton. It was Grade II listed in 1986.

The church is built of sandstone with Welsh slate roofs, and consists of a nave, a south porch, a chancel, a north vestry and a southwest steeple, and is in Gothic Revival style. The steeple has a tower with two stages, angle buttresses, a stair turret, tall two-light bell openings, and an octagonal broach spire with a clock face. There are a variety of two- and three-light pointed windows in the nave and vestry, and single lights and a four-light east window in the chancel. Inside, there is a hammer beam roof in the nave, a trefoil piscina, and some wall memorials, one dating from 1738.

== See also ==
- Listed buildings in Carlton, Selby
