= Carlton, Selby =

Village and civil parish in North Yorkshire, England

Coordinates: 53°42′36″N 1°01′20″W

Carlton
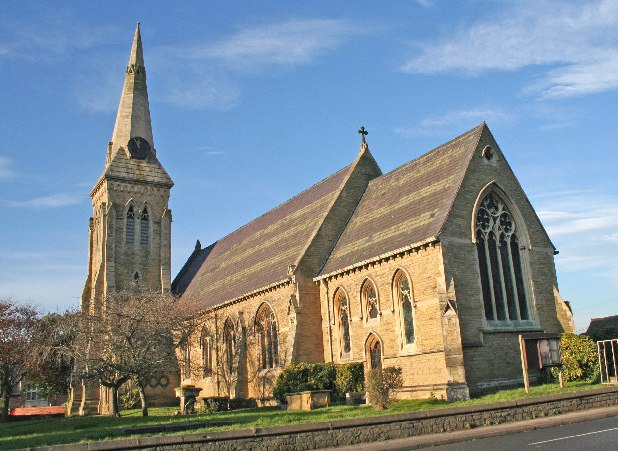
- St Mary's Anglican Church

- Location within North Yorkshire
- Population: 1,934 (2011 Census)
- OS grid reference: SE645241
  - London: 155 mi (249 km) SSE
- Civil parish: Carlton
- Unitary authority: North Yorkshire
- Ceremonial county: North Yorkshire
- Region: Yorkshire and the Humber
- Country: England
- Sovereign state: United Kingdom
- Post town: GOOLE
- Postcode district: DN14
- Dialling code: 01405
- Police: North Yorkshire
- Fire: North Yorkshire
- Ambulance: Yorkshire
- UK Parliament: Selby

Carlton is a village and civil parish in southern North Yorkshire, England. The village is situated approximately 5 miles (8 km) south-east of the town of Selby on the A1041 road. The parish had a population of 1,934 at the 2011 Census, an increase from 1,829 at the 2001 Census.

Carlton was part of the West Riding of Yorkshire until 1 April 1974, when it became part of the Selby District of the new ceremonial county of North Yorkshire. On 1 April 2023, Selby District was abolished and Carlton became part of the new North Yorkshire unitary authority area.

Holy Family Catholic High School is a secondary school located in the village. Carlton Primary School, which was called Carlton-in-Snaith Community Primary School prior to 2020, is also located in the village.

== History ==
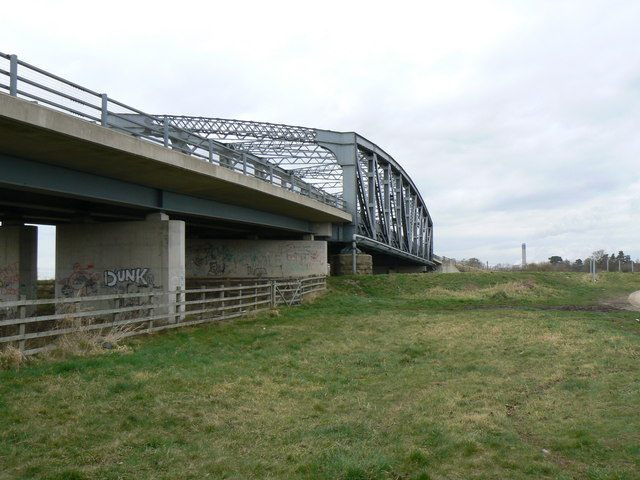
Carlton Bridge

The name Carlton derives from the Old English ceorltūn meaning the 'settlement of the free peasants'.

There are two churches in the village named for Saint Mary: St Mary's Catholic Church, built in 1842, and St Mary's Anglican Church, built in 1866.

=== Odddfellows Arms ===
The unusually named Odddfellows Arms public house is in the village. During the 1980s, a mistake by a signwriter resulted in the incorrect spelling of the name Oddfellows. In 1994, the brewery tried to correct this, only to face a backlash by the locals. The pub has since closed, been listed for housing and then refurbished and re-opened with the unusual name still above the door. Until 1850 the Odddfellows was known as the Red Lion and is believed to have served the public since 1750.

=== Carlton Towers ===
Carlton Towers is a Grade I listed Victorian stately home located in Carlton. The house was designed by Edward Welby Pugin and stands in a 250-acre estate. The house is the Yorkshire home of the 18th Duke of Norfolk but, since 1991, has been lived in, and run, by Lord Gerald Fitzalan-Howard and his family. Lord Gerald is a younger brother of the current Duke of Norfolk. Although the family still live in part of the house, it is now largely used for weddings, events and has appeared on television and in magazines.

In 1777, in response to a public petition, Thomas Stapleton of Carlton Towers built a toll bridge to the south of the village over the River Aire, to encourage the flax trade. In 1928, the West riding authority replaced the toll bridge, with an iron construction upstream. The remains of the old bridge and toll booth are now Grade I listed and visible from the new bridge.

=== Carlton railway station ===
Carlton Towers railway station served the village with a passenger service from 1885 to 1932 on the Hull and Barnsley Railway. It closed to goods traffic in 1959.

== Notable people ==
- Arthur Hinsley, Catholic cardinal, archbishop
- Thomas Thwing, Catholic educator, conspiracist
- Nigel Adams, Conservative Member of Parliament

== See also ==
- Listed buildings in Carlton, Selby
