= Bryan FitzAlan, Lord FitzAlan =

Bryan FitzAlan,
- Lord FitzAlan
- Arms of Bryan FitzAlan: Barry of eight or and gules; these were also borne by Poyntz, who won the exclusive right to them, as is related in the Caerlaverock Roll
- Died: 1 June 1306
- Buried: St Gregory's Church, Bedale, North Yorkshire, England

Bryan FitzAlan, Baron FitzAlan Knt. (died 1 June 1306) was Lord of the manor of Bedale in Richmondshire, Askham Bryan in the Ainsty, Bainton, Heworth &c., in Yorkshire, Bicker and Graby in Lincolnshire, a J.P. &c. He was appointed a Guardian of Scotland on 13 June 1291, and, by his second wife, was brother-in-law to King John Balliol of Scotland.

== Family ==
He was the son of Sir Alan FitzBryan, Knt., Lord of the Manor of Bedale, &c., (who was slain shortly before 17 May 1276 by Payn de Keu of Brandesburton in self-defence) and his spouse, Agnes, (who was still alive in July 1267) said to be a daughter of Sir Randolph FitzHenry of Ravensworth in Richmondshire. The FitzAlan family claim direct descent from Conan II, Duke of Brittany and Earl of Richmond.

In 1275–6, Gilbert de Stapleton arraigned an assize of novel disseisin against him and others touching a tenement in Thorntoncolling', Yorkshire. In 1280–1, Peter de Mauley arraigned an assize of darrein presentment against him touching the church of Bampton, Yorkshire. In 1280–1, Peter de Mauley arraigned an assize of darrein presentment against him touching the church of Beyntoz.

On the Wednesday before St. Martin, 1290, he founded by charter, at Bedale, a chantry which he appropriated to Jervaulx Abbey to pray for the souls of the late Countess of Richmond, of Alan his father and Agnes his mother, Muriel his (first) wife, and Thomas, Robert, and Theobald, his sons, &c.

On 20 September 1291, he had a licence to crenellate his house at Killerby, near Catterick, in the wapentake of East Hang, according to Genuki.

== Scotland ==
Sir Bryan was on the King's service in Wales in 1277 and 1287. On 1 May 1285, being about to go beyond the seas on pilgrimage, he had Letters of Protection from the Crown for two years. He was Constable of both Roxburgh Castle and Jedburgh Castle from 4 August 1291 to 18 November 1292 and those of Dundee and Forfar from 1290 until the same day. He was present at the assemblies held at Berwick-upon-Tweed in October and November 1292 during the discussions surrounding the Great Cause. As a Guardian of Scotland, he was one of those commanded on 18 November 1292 to give sasine of the Kingdom of Scotland to John de Balliol.

On 12 July 1297, he was appointed Captain for the defence of Northumberland and, on 18 October following, a Keeper of the Scottish Marches in that county. He was constituted Keeper of Scotland, at a salary of 2,000 marks a year, on 18 August 1297. He served at the Battle of Falkirk on 22 July 1298 and was at the siege of Caerlaverock Castle in July 1300.

== Peerage ==
Sir Bryan was summoned for Military Service from 6 April 1282 to 7 November 1302, to a Military Council on 14 June 1287, and to attend upon the King at Salisbury on 26 January 1298. He was summoned to parliament from 24 June 1295 to 22 January 1305 by Writs directed to Briano filio Alani, whereby he is held to have become Lord FitzAlan. As Brianus fil. Alani d'n's [dominus] de Bedale he took part in the Barons' Letter to the Pope, dated 12 February 1301.

== Marriage ==
He married twice:

(1) Muriel (surname unknown), who died before 8 November 1290 and is buried in Bedale Church. Nothing is known about Lord FitzAlan's sons by his first marriage, but it appears they were all dead by 1290 when he commissioned a chapel dedicated to prayers for them and their mother.

- Thomas (died before 8 November 1290)
- Robert (died before 8 November 1290)
- Theobald (died before 8 November 1290)

(2) Maud de Balliol, who was married before 2 July 1297. She was a sister of King John Balliol of Scotland and daughter of John de Balliol (d. 1268), Lord of Barnard Castle, by his spouse Devorguilla (d. 1290), daughter of Alan, Lord of Galloway (d. 1234). Devorguilla was a great-great-granddaughter of King David I of Scotland. Maud, as a widow, was still living 10 April 1340, when she granted the advowson of the church of Rokeby, together with a messuage and a bovate and a half of land, to Egglestone Abbey to celebrate services for her good estate during her lifetime, and for her soul after her death, and for the souls of Brian her husband and John de Grey of Rotherfield, their ancestors and heirs, and all the faithful deceased. She was later buried in the Church of the Black Friars at York. By his second marriage, his daughters were his co-heirs in his landed estates and those of his brother, Theobald.

- Agnes (b. 1298), whose marriage was granted on 10 May 1306 (when she was just 8 years old) to Sir Miles de Stapleton of Carlton, Yorkshire, for his younger son, Sir Gilbert Stapleton (died 1321). Their son, Sir Miles Stapleton of Bedale, was a Knight Founder of the Order of the Garter. Their great-great-grandson, Sir Miles Stapleton of Bedale, also held the feudal barony of Ingham, Norfolk. **not to be confused with the second creation of 1627 by parliament which is separate from this creation 1297. For the 1627 creation the present heir is Edward Fitzalan-Howard, 18th Duke of Norfolk, grandson of Mona Fitzalan-Howard, 11th Baroness Beaumont, whose paternal forebear Nicholas Errington assumed the surname Stapleton upon marriage to the Stapleton heiress.**
- Katherine (1300 – d. before 7 August 1328) married Sir John de Grey, 1st Baron Grey of Rotherfield, K.G. (9 October 1300 – 1 September 1359).

The lordship of the manor of Bedale passed via the eldest daughter.

== Death ==
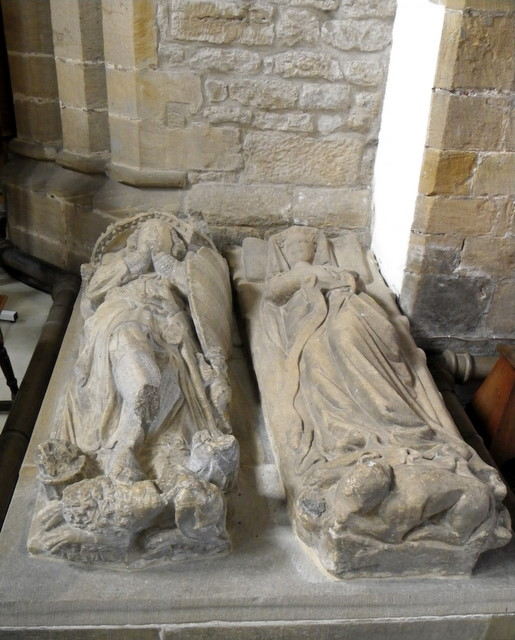
Effigies of Brian FitzAlan and his first wife Muriel

Lord FitzAlan died on 1 June 1306 and was buried in Bedale Church next to his first wife.

The lordship initially passed into abeyance with the death of Lord Lovell in the Wars of the Roses. This remained true until Lord Beaumont petitioned for the restoration of titles, following the discovery of the remains of the said Francis Lovell, 1st Viscount Lovell, in a chamber. It was previously thought that his line was not entitled to succeed him, but it turned out that there was a technicality, and so, the Errington assumer of the name Stapleton of Carlton Towers, who had inherited from Lord Lovell's sister, ended up having the titles reversed to him. The Duke of Norfolk married the Baroness Beaumont, and thus, the Lordship of Bedale is genetically Howard these days, although, also, as GENUKI reports, they no longer own any land in the township of Bedale. Long occupants of Aiskew and recusant supporters of Catholic revival in the 19th century, the FitzScolland, FitzAlan, Stapleton, Grey of Rotherfield, Deincourt, Lovell, Errington, etc. family inheritance is now taken to be assumed by the Beresford-Peirse baronets, who are part of a long line of landlords from different local families who bought their way into the manor, or foreigners who were appointed there from the time of Henry VII and Elizabeth I, beginning with the attainders of Lovell and of Simon Digby in the Rising of the North. The most recent disruption in the land ownership (which ultimately failed) was when Parliament charged the Stapletons with the papacy and the Peirses with malignancy to purge the Catholic and Anglican stronghold out of this region.

== Sources ==
- Dictionary of National Biography, Oxford, 1904. (Entry).
- Foster, Joseph, editor, The Visitation of Yorkshire 1584/85 by Robert Glover, Somerset Herald, plus that made in 1612 by Richard St.George, Norroy King of Arms, London, 1875, pp. 294, 332, where Sir Bryan's Arms are given as: "Barry of eight Or and Gules".
- Richardson, Douglas, Plantagenet Ancestry, Baltimore, Maryland: 2004, pp. 554, 682. ISBN 0-8063-1750-7
