= Miles Stapleton, 1st Lord Stapleton =

Miles Stapleton (died 24 June 1314) was an English baron. He was a member of parliament in 1313 and died at the Battle of Bannockburn.

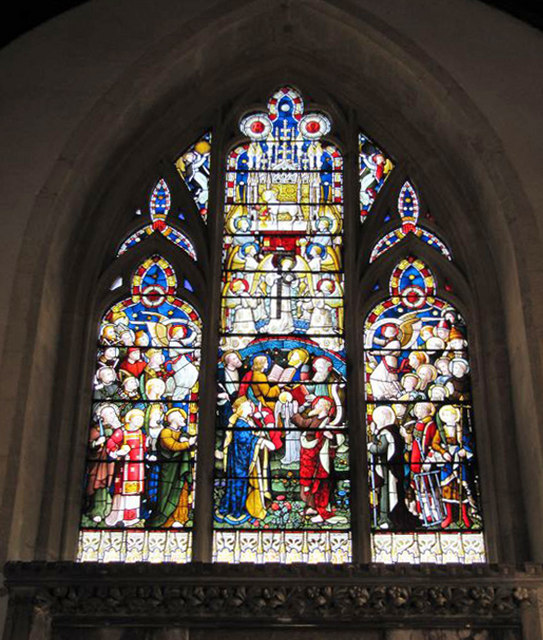
Stained glass window from the chapel Miles built at North Moreton

== Family ==
Miles was the son of Nicholas de Stapleton III and his wife Margaret, daughter of Miles Basset. Nicholas belonged to a Richmondshire family that took its name from the township of Stapleton, in which it possessed a small estate. The first member of the family to attain any position was Nicholas de Stapleton I, who was custos of Middleham Castle in the reign of King John. He was the father of Nicholas de Stapleton II, who was in turn the father of Nicholas III, who served as a judge of the king's bench between 1272 and 1290. He held sixteen carucates of land scattered throughout Yorkshire, besides some Berkshire lands that he obtained from his wife, and died in 1290.

Miles de Stapleton was the eldest surviving son, and at his father's death was already married to Sybil (also called Isabel), daughter and coheiress to John de Bellew. Through her mother Laderana, Sybil inherited a share of the possessions of the elder line of the Bruces, which were divided among four sisters and coheiresses at the death of her uncle, Peter de Bruce of Skelton, in 1271. In memory of this connection with a great house, Miles assumed the lion rampant of the Bruces as his arms.

By his first wife, Sybil, Miles left several children. The eldest, Nicholas, born in 1286, was summoned to parliament, and died in 1343. His son and successor, Miles, died in 1372. Miles's only son, Thomas, died in 1373, whereupon the barony fell into abeyance, and the estates of the elder branch passed to his sister Elizabeth, and remained with the Metham family, her husband's kin. A younger son of Miles and Sybil, Gilbert (died 1321), became royal escheator beyond Trent, and by his wife Agnes, daughter of Brian Fitzalan, lord of Bedale, was the father of Miles Stapleton of Bedale and Bryan Stapleton (died 1394).

Sybil died before August 1301. Miles married, as his second wife, Joan, daughter of Peter of Tynedale. By her he had a daughter named Joan. She survived him but had died by September 1316.

== Career ==
Miles served Edward I in the Gascon War and Scottish War. In 1291 he was engaged on the king's business, under Roger de Mowbray, in Scotland. In 1295 he was in Gascony. In 1298 he was in the Falkirk campaign, serving under his patron Henry de Lacy, third earl of Lincoln. In 1300 he was summoned to the siege of Carlaverock, but he is not mentioned in the famous French poem on the siege. In the same year he accompanied the earl of Lincoln, on a mission to the court of Rome, receiving on 9 October letters of protection for one year.

Miles was entrusted by the king with the direction of the household of Edward, prince of Wales, and served in the siege of Stirling, in attendance on the prince. In October 1305, when the earl of Lincoln wished to appoint Stapleton to manage his household during his absence at the papal court, the prince informed the earl that he had no power to give Stapleton leave to hold this post without the express command of the king. Miles was one of the experienced men of affairs to whom Edward I entrusted the difficult task of bringing up his son in businesslike and soldierly ways. Meanwhile his estates and influence in Yorkshire were steadily increasing. The betrothal of his eldest son to a daughter of John of Brittany, earl of Richmond, and a grand-niece of the king, and his second son's betrothal to one of the daughters of Brian Fitzalan, connected him with two branches of the greatest family of his district, and increased the importance of the house. After the death of Edmund of Cornwall had led to the lapse of his vast property to the crown, Edward I made Stapleton seneschal of Knaresborough Castle, and steward and joint constable of the Forest of Knaresborough. In 1305 he was, jointly with John de Byron, appointed commissioner to suppress the clubmen or trailbastons of Lancashire, but they were shortly afterwards superseded.

With Edward II's accession Miles's importance was for the moment increased. He became steward to the king's household, and went abroad in January 1308 on the occasion of the king's marriage at Boulogne. In a few months, however, he lost his stewardship, and was forced to surrender the royal manor of Burstwick in Holderness, of which he had had custody, to Piers Gaveston. In 1311 he was summoned to serve against the Scots. His losses in the interests of Gaveston made Stapleton hostile to his old master Edward, and attached him to Earl Thomas of Lancaster. He was in October 1313 included, with his wife and three sons, in a long list of adherents of Lancaster, who were then pardoned for the murder of Gaveston. Previously to this, however, he had received back the custody of Brustwick, and in the same year he was thrice summoned as a baron to parliament. In 1314 he obeyed the summons to muster for the relief of Stirling. On 24 June he was slain, along with two of his sons, at the Battle of Bannockburn.

== Pious benefactions ==
Among Miles's pious benefactions the most important was the establishment of a chapel dedicated to Saint Nicholas in North Moreton, where he had an outlying estate. This building still survives, with the contemporary stained glass in the east window, now much spoilt through successive stages of neglect and restoration. The license to alienate lands in mortmain to endow two chaplains to celebrate divine service in the chapel is dated 28 March 1299. In 1310 he endowed a chaplain in St John the Baptist's Church, Haddlesey.
