= GENUKI =

Genealogy web portal

GENUKI is a genealogy web portal, run as a charitable trust. It "provides a virtual reference library of genealogical information of particular relevance to the UK and Ireland". It gives access to a large collection of information, with the emphasis on primary sources, or means to access them, rather than on existing genealogical research.

== Name ==
The name derives from the phrase "Genealogy of the UK and Ireland", although its coverage is wider than this. From the GENUKI website:

The UK and Ireland are regarded, for the purposes of this Genealogical Information Service, as being made up of England, Ireland (i.e. Northern Ireland and the Republic of Ireland), Wales, and Scotland, together with the Channel Islands and the Isle of Man. Together, these constitute the British Isles - which is a geographical term for a group of islands lying off the north-west coast of mainland Europe. (Legally, the Channel Islands and the Isle of Man are largely self governing, and are not part of the United Kingdom.)

== Structure ==
The website has a well defined structure at four levels.

- The first level is information that is common to all "the United Kingdom and Ireland".
- The next level has information for each of England (see example) Ireland, Scotland, Wales, the Channel Islands and the Isle of Man.
- The third level has information on each pre-1974 county of England and Wales, each of the pre-1975 counties of Scotland, each of the 32 counties of Ireland and each island of the Channel Islands (e.g. Cheshire, County Kerry and Guernsey).
- The fourth level has information on each town or parish (e.g. Antrobus, Cheshire).

The structure is shown diagrammatically in the "Contents and Site Map".

=== Subject headings ===
At each level, some of the subject headings from the list prepared by the Family History Library in Salt Lake City are used. The full list is:

- Almanacs
- Archives and Libraries
- Bibliography
- Biography
- Business and Commerce Records
- Cemeteries
- Censuses
- Chronology
- Church Directories
- Church History
- Church Records
- Civil Registration
- Colonization
- Correctional Institutions
- Court Records
- Description and Travel
- Directories
- Dwellings
- Emigration and Immigration
- Encyclopedias
- Ethnology
- Folklore
- Gazetteers
- Genealogy
- Guardianship
- Handwriting
- Heraldry
- Historical Geography
- History
- Inventories
- Jewish History
- Jewish Records
- Land and Property
- Languages
- Law and Legislation
- Manors
- Maps
- Medical Records
- Merchant Marine
- Migration, Internal
- Military History
- Military Records
- Minorities
- Names, Geographical
- Names, Personal
- Naturalisation and Citizenship
- Newspapers
- Nobility
- Obituaries
- Occupations
- Officials and Employees
- Orphans and Orphanages
- Pensions
- Periodicals
- Politics and Government
- Poorhouses, Poor Law etc.
- Population
- Postal and Shipping Guides
- Probate Records
- Public Records
- Religion and Religious Life
- Schools
- Social Life and Customs
- Societies
- Statistics
- Taxation
- Town Records
- Visitations, Heraldic
- Voting Registers
- Yearbooks

== Contents ==
In some instances GENUKI pages include actual information, but more often they provide links to sources of information, either as online links or by providing information about hard copy publications or repositories. For many locations, a description is quoted from an old (and therefore out-of-copyright) gazetteer. As GENUKI is maintained solely by volunteers, the level of detail varies in different parts of the site. Material on the GENUKI website is copyright, and also protected by UK database right, and it must only be used for personal research and not copied onto other websites.
