= Bedale High School =

Secondary school in Bedale, North Yorkshire, England

Location
- Fitzalan Road; Bedale, North Yorkshire, DL8 2EQ; England
- 54.2840°N 1.5912°W

Information
- Type: Community school
- Established: 1588 (as Bedale Grammar School)
- Local authority: North Yorkshire Council
- Department for Education URN: 121670 Tables
- Ofsted: Reports
- Headteacher: Chris Stokes
- Age: 11 to 16
- Enrolment: 565 (2024)
- Website: http://www.bedalehighschool.org.uk/

Bedale High School is a coeducational comprehensive secondary school situated on Fitzalan Road, Bedale, North Yorkshire, England.

Its predecessor Bedale Grammar School dates to an endowment of 1588. Nicholas Carlisle in his 1818 survey of endowed grammar schools describes the school as 'ancient', evidencing the fact that the school received Crown funding following the dissolution of the monasteries (1536–1540).

The School's 2004 Ofsted Inspection Report rated the school for overall effectiveness as Grade 2 (good); in 2007 again as Grade 2; and in 2010, as Grade 3 (satisfactory). In 2019, it was awarded a Grade 2 (good) rating.

In 2001, just before the 2001 General Election, Jonathan Dimbleby hosted a live broadcast of Any Questions? from the school. In 2017, the police were called to a disturbance on the school playing field. The protest by students was in regard to a restriction on toilet breaks, which one parent described as "humiliating". The police stated it was not a criminal matter.

== Notable pupils ==
- Michael Duff, professional footballer and football manager
- Shane Duff, professional footballer
- Paul Grayson, cricketer
- Simon Grayson, football manager
