= Stapleton baronets =

There have been three baronetcies created in the Baronetage of England for families called Stapleton (also Stapylton). These are all extinct.

- Stapylton baronets of Myton (1660)
- Stapleton baronets of Carlton (1662)
- Stapleton baronets of the Leeward Islands (1679)
