= Georgina Fitzalan-Howard, Duchess of Norfolk =

British noble

Georgina, Duchess of Norfolk
- Born: Georgina Susan Gore; 30 January 1962 (age 64)
- Occupation: Paint specialist (formerly)
- Spouse: Edward Fitzalan-Howard, 18th Duke of Norfolk (m. 1987; div. 2022)
- Children: Henry Fitzalan-Howard, Earl of Arundel; Lady Rachel Fitzalan-Howard; Lord Thomas Fitzalan-Howard; Lady Isabel Fitzalan-Howard; Lord Philip Fitzalan-Howard
- Parent(s): John Gore; Serena Mounsey

Georgina Susan Fitzalan-Howard, Duchess of Norfolk (born 30 January 1962), is the ex-wife of Edward William Fitzalan-Howard, 18th Duke of Norfolk.

== Early life and family ==
She was born Georgina Susan Gore, the younger daughter of John Temple ("Jack") Gore (1931–2018) and his first wife, Serena Margaret Mounsey. Her parents divorced in 1969.

Jack Gore was very distantly connected to the Earls Temple of Stowe and was descended from Sir John Gore, Lord Mayor of London.

Her paternal grandmother, Lady Barbara Montgomerie (23 August 1909 – 1992), was the eldest daughter of Archibald Montgomerie, 16th Earl of Eglinton, by his former wife Lady Beatrice Dalrymple, daughter of the 11th Earl of Stair.

Georgina's elder sister Charlotte Gore married Major Sir Hervey James Hugh Bruce-Clifton, 7th Bt. and her elder brother Christopher Gore (d. 2015) was remarried to Catherine Dickens, a descendant of the novelist Charles Dickens, and lived in Hungary.

== Personal life ==
Georgina worked as a paint specialist at Colefax & Fowler before her marriage.

She married Edward Fitzalan-Howard, then Earl of Arundel and Surrey, son of Miles Stapleton-Fitzalan-Howard, 17th Duke of Norfolk, and his wife, Anne Mary Teresa Constable-Maxwell, on 27 June 1987 at Arundel Cathedral; the wedding had 800 guests including Diana, Princess of Wales (a personal friend of the groom). The couple moved into the East wing of Arundel Castle after the marriage.

They have five children (three sons and two daughters):

- Henry Miles Fitzalan-Howard, Earl of Arundel (born 3 December 1987); he is heir apparent to his father's titles.
- Lady Rachel Rose Fitzalan-Howard (born 10 June 1989)
- Lord Thomas Jack Fitzalan-Howard (born 14 March 1992)
- Lady Isabel Serena Fitzalan-Howard (born 7 February 1994)
- Lord Philip Fitzalan-Howard (born 14 July 1996)

Lord Arundel succeeded to the Dukedom of Norfolk in 2002, and Lady Arundel then became the Duchess of Norfolk. As duchess, she stood in for Queen Elizabeth II in rehearsals for the State Opening of Parliament.

The Duke and Duchess separated in 2011, but were reconciled by 2016, only to split up again; their divorce became final in 2022. Since her divorce, she has been styled Georgina, Duchess of Norfolk.

== Charitable work ==
The Duchess is patron of a number of charities, including:

- DePaul International
- Ferring Country Centre
- NSPCC South and Mid Sussex branch
- Arun Choral Society
- Arun Young Musicians
- Home-Start Hampshire.
- St Vincent dePaul Society, England and Wales

== Honours ==
She is a Deputy Lieutenant for West Sussex.

In February 2026, she was made Patron of the Challoner Club, a private member's club for Roman Catholics in London.

- (Kingdom of the Two Sicilies) House of Bourbon-Two Sicilies (Duosicilian Royal Family): Dame Grand Officer of Justice of the Sacred Military Constantinian Order of Saint George
