= Miles Stapleton of Bedale =

Medieval English knight

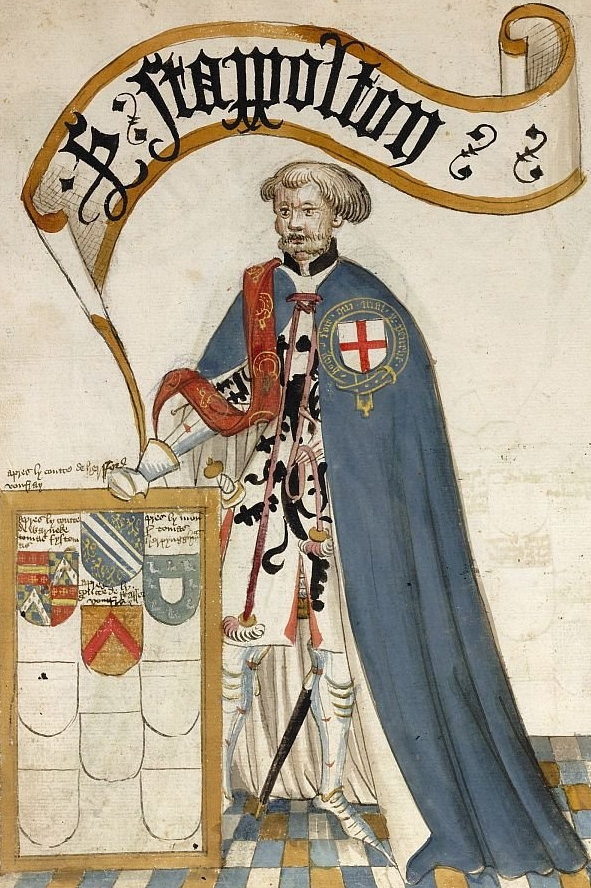

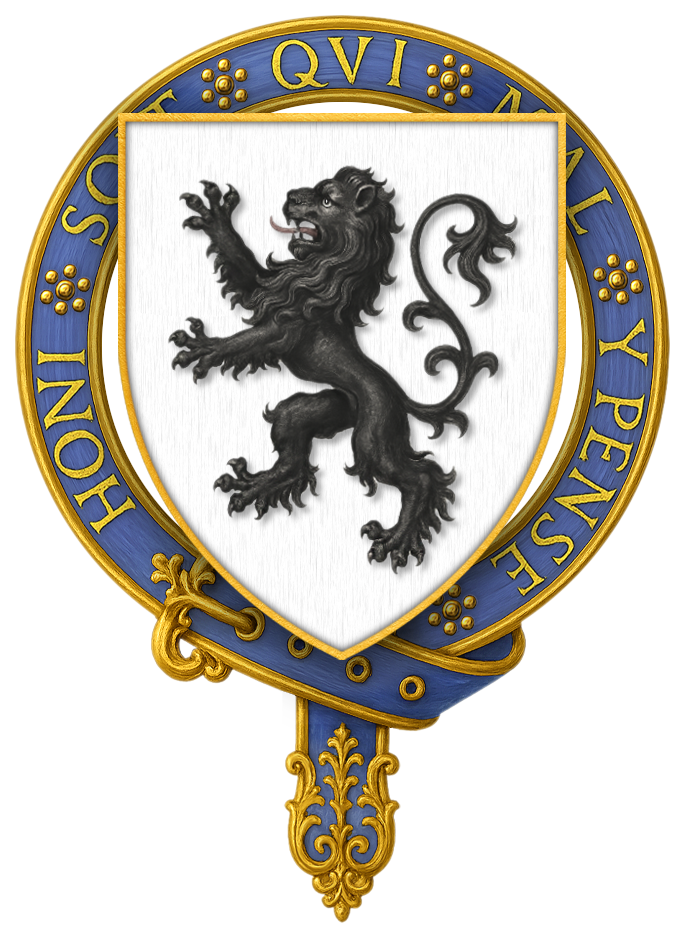
Arms of Sir Miles Stapleton, KG -- argent a lion rampant sable

Sir Miles Stapleton of Bedale (or of Cotherstone) KG (1316–1364) was an English knight, and one of the Knights Founder of the Order of the Garter.

== Biography ==
He was the eldest son of Sir Gilbert de Stapleton, Knt. (died 1321), and paternal grandson of Miles de Stapleton (died 1314). His mother was Matilda (born 1298), also called Agnes, elder daughter and coheiress of Brian FitzAlan, 1st Baron FitzAlan, lord of Bedale, Askham Bryan, and Cotherstone. Through his paternal line, he was a great-grandson of Dervorguilla of Galloway, mother of John Balliol, King of Scotland, and a descendant of the Bruces by Laderia, daughter of Peter III de Brus of Skelton and grandmother of Sir Gilbert. Sir Miles Stapleton of Bedale should not be confused with Sir Miles Stapleton of Haddlesey (ca. 1318–1372), occasionally identified as le seigneur.

Only an infant at the death of his father, he was at the Siege of Tournai (1340) with his younger brother Brian Stapleton, and then fought in Brittany during the War of Breton Succession. He was probably at the Siege of Calais in 1347. He participated in three tournaments between October 1347 and January 1348, at Bury St Edmunds, Eltham, and Windsor, after which he was described as a knight of the chamber in the Wardrobe accounts. He was made a founder Knight of the Garter (stall 17) in 1348.

In October 1351, Stapleton joined the newly knighted William Latimer abroad. In 1354, he participated in an embassy to Pope Innocent VI requesting intervention in the Anglo-French war. Stapleton joined Henry Lancaster's raid across Normandy in 1356 in support of Philippe de Navarre, whom he served in 1358 as a messenger. In June 1361, he received an annuity of 100 pounds from the exchequer for his "unwearied labours and laudable services". He may have been the Miles Stapleton who was one of the witnesses to the Treaty of Brétigny in 1360. In March 1361 and August 1362 he served on commissions of peace with the Earl of Suffolk. In January 1363, Stapleton was one of a group of English knights recorded as borrowing money from local merchants at Toruń in Poland, most likely during a Prussian crusade.

He died in December 1364, possibly, as the family historian conjectures, of wounds received in the Battle of Auray (29 September 1364).

== Family ==
He was three times married. By his first wife he had a son John, who died in 1355. He married his second wife in 1350. This lady was Joan, daughter and coheiress of Oliver de Ingham in Norfolk, and widow of Roger Lestrange of Nockin. Henceforward Stapleton is as often described as 'of Ingham' as of 'Bedale', and became a considerable proprietor in Norfolk. Stapleton's eldest son John died before him, and he was succeeded at Ingham as well as Bedale by Miles, his son by the heiress of Ingham. Their other issue was a daughter Joan, married to Sir John Plays. Another three generations in the male line succeeded Stapleton and Ingleton, after which the property was divided among coheiresses.
