= Bryan Stapleton =

English medieval knight

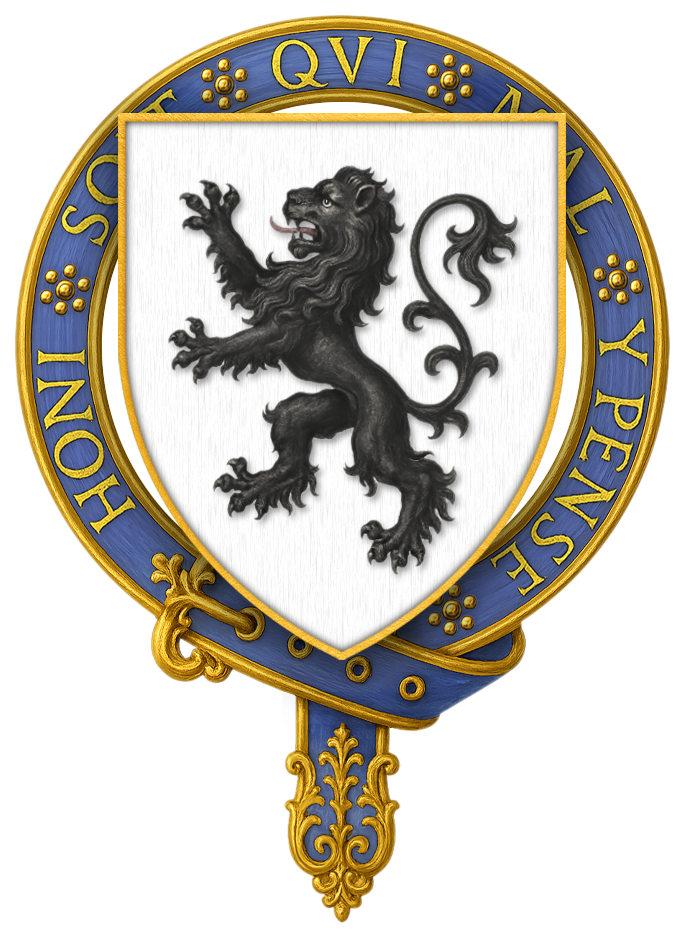
- Coat of arms
- Born: c.1322
- Died: 1394 (aged 71–72)
- Spouse: Alice de St. Philibert
- Issue: Brian Stapleton; Miles Stapleton

Sir Bryan Stapleton KG (c. 1322 – 1394) was an English medieval knight from Yorkshire.

== Life ==
He was the younger brother of Sir Miles Stapleton and the third son of Sir Gilbert Stapleton (died 1321) and his wife, Agnes (or Matilda; 1297/8–1348), daughter and coheir of Brian, Lord Fitzalan (died 1306), of Bedale and several other estates in the same county. Through his mother, he was considered a second great-grandson of Dervorguilla of Galloway, through her son John Balliol, King of Scotland. Through his father, he was a great-grandson of Ladereyne (Laderina), daughter of Peter III de Brus of Skelton, a descendant of the Bruces.

His first campaign must have been King Edward III's expedition to France in 1340 and the siege of Tournai - he stated this himself during a heraldic dispute involving his friend, Richard, Lord Scrope of Bolton. In his own words, he fought in all the great battles and expeditions of King Edward's reign, including the battle of Crécy and the siege of Calais in 1346–7.

Bryan served under the banner of William Montagu, Earl of Salisbury, in France in 1359-60 and, very likely, before that date as well. In 1369, he joined Edmund of Langley, Earl of Cambridge, and John Hastings, Earl of Pembroke, in the expeditionary force sent to relieve Edward, the Black Prince, in Aquitaine. In 1372, he witnessed a truce with the duke of Brittany, but in 1373, he sailed with Salisbury in the fleet that raided the coast of Brittany and defended Brest. In February 1380, he was appointed Captain of Calais Castle and in 1381, Captain of Guînes.

Stapleton was made a knight of the Garter in 1382; in the following year he and Salisbury escorted King Richard II's young bride, Anne of Bohemia, to Calais; and in 1383, he held a muster there of the troops led by Henry le Despenser, Bishop of Norwich for a campaign in Flanders. He participated in the following negotiations with embassies from France and Flanders, leading to the truce of Leulinghen. He served on the Scottish border between 1386 and 1388, when he was both a commissioner to take evidence and a witness in Lord Scrope's dispute with Sir Robert Grosvenor mentioned above.

In 1376, Stapleton bought Wighill, where he died on 25 July 1394. His will, written in French, was dated 16 May the same year, and is published in Testamenta Eboracensia (i. 198 sq.). He directed that his body should be buried at Helaugh Priory, beside his wife, who had died before him.

== Family ==
He inherited Carlton and Kentmere from a cousin.

Before 1360, Stapleton married Alice, widow of Sir Stephen Waleys of Helaugh and daughter and coheiress of Sir John de St. Philibert. He left two sons, of whom, the elder, Brian, who married Elizabeth, daughter of Sir William de Aldeburgh, 1st Baron Aldeburgh, and was the ancestor of the Stapletons of Carlton, died before him; the younger, Sir Miles (died 1400), was the ancestor of the Stapletons of Wighill.

Brian Stapleton, his young grandson, succeeded him and fell near Alençon in 1417, fighting in the retinue of Thomas Montagu, 4th Earl of Salisbury.
