= Baron Beaumont =

Barony in the Peerage of England

Baron Beaumont is an ancient title in the Peerage of England, created in 1309 for a younger branch of the French counts of de Brienne family. The sixth Baron Beaumont was created Viscount Beaumont (the first creation of this rank in England) in 1432; after the death of his son the 2nd Viscount both titles fell into abeyance.

In 1840 the abeyance of the barony was terminated in favour of Miles Thomas Stapleton who was called to the peerage as the 8th Baron Beaumont. His paternal great-great-grandfather Nicholas Errington (d.1716), of Pont-Eland, Northumberland, had adopted the surname and arms of Stapleton having inherited the manor of Carlton from his childless uncle Miles Stapleton, 1st Baronet.

The 8th Baron was succeeded by his sons Henry and Miles, the 9th and 10th Barons respectively. The barony was briefly in abeyance again following the death of the 10th Baron and was called out in favour of his daughter, Mona, in 1896. The 11th Baroness Beaumont married Bernard Fitzalan-Howard, 3rd Baron Howard of Glossop in 1914. Their eldest son Miles succeeded his mother as 12th Baron Beaumont in 1971, his father as 4th Baron Howard of Glossop in 1972 and, in 1975, his second cousin once removed Bernard Fitzalan-Howard, 16th Duke of Norfolk as 17th Duke of Norfolk. The Beaumont Barony is currently (as of 2014) held by the 18th Duke of Norfolk.

The Beaumont title descends to "heirs of the body", while the Dukedom of Norfolk descends to "heirs male". The titles may therefore eventually separate.

The Stapleton family's seat was Carlton Towers (built upon their ancient manor of Carlton) which in 1971 was inherited by the 17th Duke of Norfolk from his mother Mona Stapleton, 11th Baroness Beaumont.

== Barons Beaumont (1309) ==
Arms of Beaumont (Earl of Buchan, Viscount Beaumont): Azure semée of fleurs-de-lis, a lion rampant or

- Henry de Beaumont, 1st Baron Beaumont, 4th Earl of Buchan (bef. 1305–1340)
- John Beaumont, 2nd Baron Beaumont (aft. 1317–1342)
- Henry Beaumont, 3rd Baron Beaumont (d. 1369), married Margaret de Vere
- John Beaumont, 4th Baron Beaumont (1360 / 1361–1396)
- Henry Beaumont, 5th Baron Beaumont (1379 / 1380–1413)
- John Beaumont, 6th Baron Beaumont (c.1409–1460) (created Viscount Beaumont in 1440)

== Viscounts Beaumont (1440) ==
- John Beaumont, 1st Viscount Beaumont, 6th Baron Beaumont (c.1409–1460)
- William Beaumont, 2nd Viscount Beaumont, 7th Baron Beaumont (bef. 1441–1507) (viscountcy extinct, barony abeyant)

== Barons Beaumont (1309; Reverted 1840) ==
Arms of Stapleton of Carlton: Argent, a lion rampant sable

- Miles Thomas Stapleton, 8th Baron Beaumont (1805–1854) (abeyance terminated in 1840)
- Henry Stapleton, 9th Baron Beaumont (1848–1892)
- Miles Stapleton, 10th Baron Beaumont (1850–1895) (fell into abeyance on his death)

Arms of Howard

- Mona Josephine Tempest Stapleton, 11th Baroness Beaumont (1894–1971) (abeyance terminated in 1896)
- Miles Francis Stapleton Fitzalan-Howard, 17th Duke of Norfolk, 12th Baron Beaumont (1915–2002)
- Edward William Fitzalan-Howard, 18th Duke of Norfolk, 13th Baron Beaumont (b. 1956), eldest son of the 12th Baron

The heir apparent is the present holder's eldest son, Henry Miles Fitzalan-Howard, Earl of Arundel (b. 1987)

== See also ==
- Viscount Beaumont of Swords
- Beaumont baronets
- Beaumont Herald Extraordinary
- House of Beaumont
