= Edward Fitzalan-Howard, 18th Duke of Norfolk =

British peer (born 1956)

His Grace The Duke of Norfolk GCVO DL
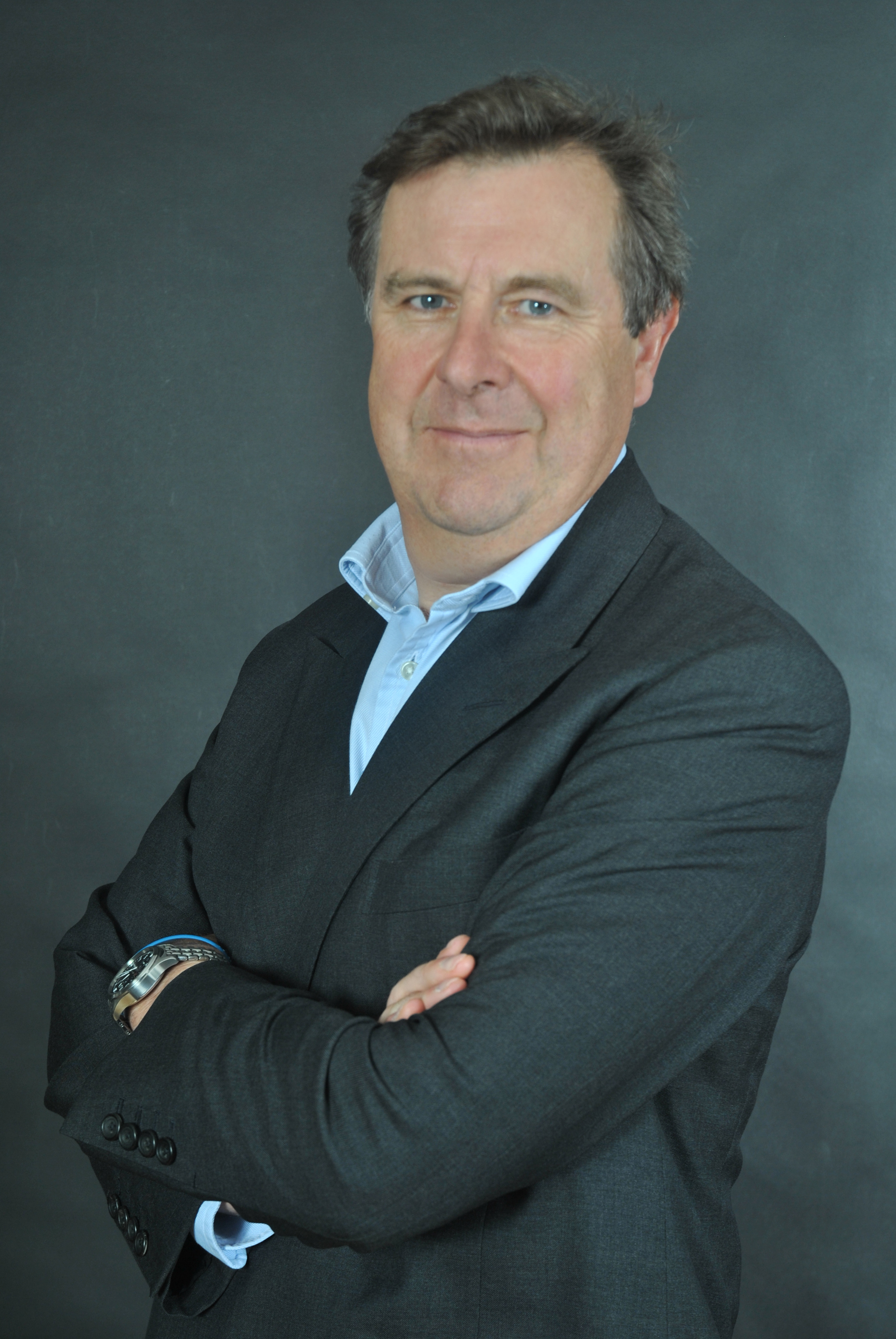
- Portrait by Allan Warren, 2013

Earl Marshal
- Incumbent
- Assumed office 24 June 2002
- Monarchs: Elizabeth II; Charles III
- Preceded by: The 17th Duke of Norfolk

Member of the House of Lords
- Lord Temporal
- Ex officio as Earl Marshal; 24 June 2002 – 29 April 2026
- Preceded by: The 17th Duke of Norfolk
- Succeeded by: Seat abolished

Personal details
- Born: Edward William Fitzalan-Howard; 2 December 1956 (age 69)
- Spouses: Georgina Gore (m. 1987; div. 2022) Francesca Herbert (m. 2022)
- Children: 5, including Henry Fitzalan-Howard, Earl of Arundel
- Parents: Miles Fitzalan-Howard, 17th Duke of Norfolk; Anne Constable-Maxwell
- Education: Ampleforth College; Lincoln College, Oxford
- Title: Duke of Norfolk
- Tenure: 24 June 2002 – present
- Predecessor: Miles Fitzalan-Howard, 17th Duke of Norfolk
- Heir: Henry Fitzalan-Howard, Earl of Arundel

Edward William Fitzalan-Howard, 18th Duke of Norfolk, GCVO, DL (born 2 December 1956), styled Earl of Arundel between 1975 and 2002, is a British peer who holds the hereditary office of Earl Marshal. As Duke of Norfolk, he is the most senior non-royal peer in the Peerage of England. He is also the titular head of the House of Howard.

== Background and education ==
Norfolk is the son of Miles Francis Stapleton Fitzalan-Howard, 17th Duke of Norfolk, and his wife Anne Mary Teresa Constable-Maxwell. He was educated at Ampleforth College, a Roman Catholic independent school, before going up to Lincoln College, Oxford.

He has a brother and three sisters. His only brother, Lord Gerald Fitzalan-Howard, runs the Carlton Towers estate with his wife, Emma Fitzalan-Howard. The Duke's eldest sister is the Countess of Balfour. His second sister, Lady Carina Fitzalan-Howard, is the widow of broadcaster David Frost. His third and youngest sister is the actress Marsha Fitzalan.

== Career ==
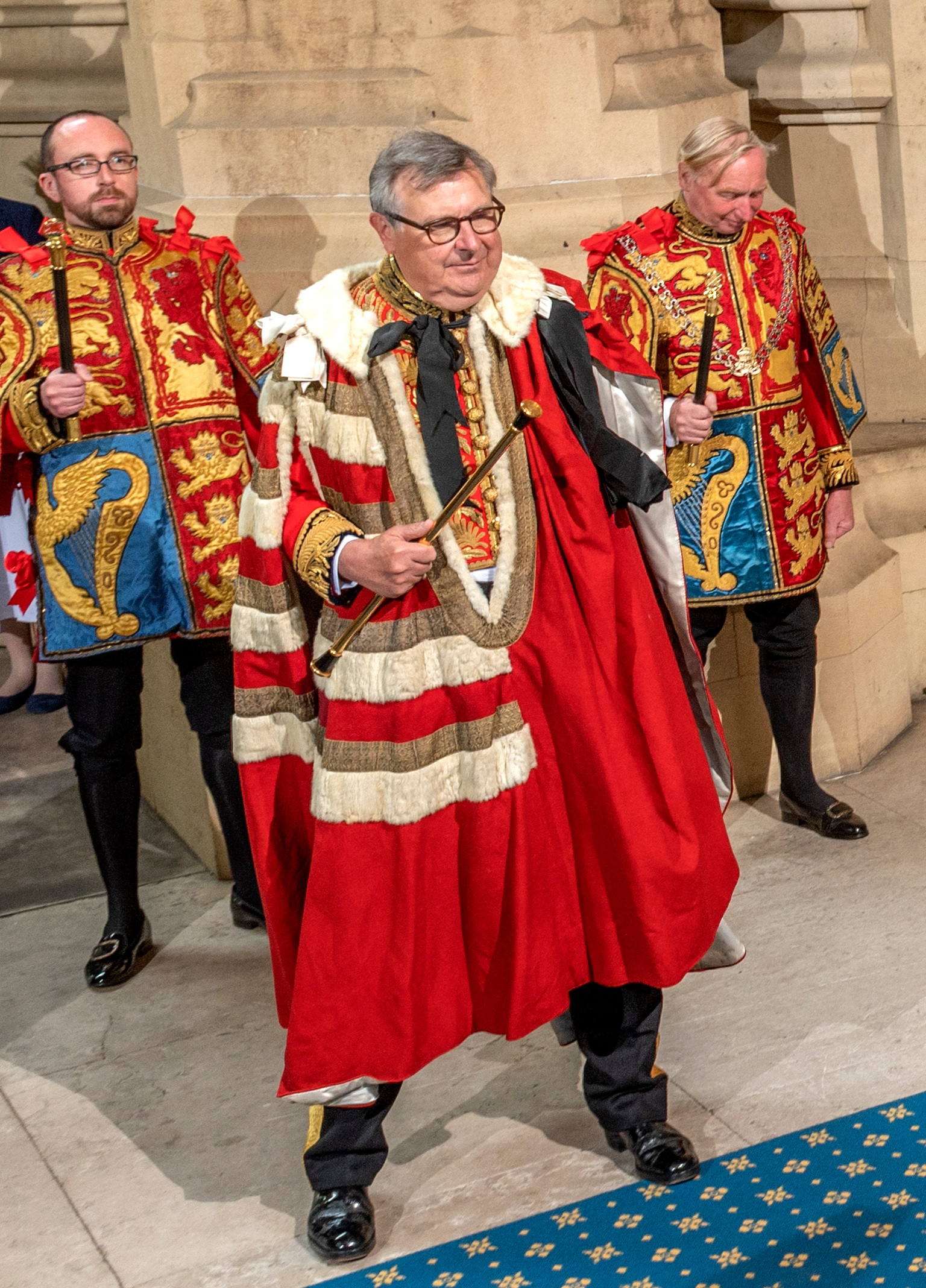
The Duke wearing parliamentary robes as Earl Marshal in 2022

Norfolk worked with various companies, and from 2000 to 2002 was Deputy Earl Marshal. Upon the death of his father in 2002, he inherited the late Duke of Norfolk's peerages and the position of Earl Marshal. He was a Cub Scout while at school at Ampleforth College and currently holds two appointments in the Scout Movement. He was the President of 1st Arundel (Earl of Arundel's Own) Scout Group in 2010, and still serves as President of the Arundel & Littlehampton District Scouts up to present. He is also Patron of West Sussex County Scouts. In June 2003, he was awarded the Medal of Merit for Services by the Scout Movement. He is an Honorary Fellow of St Edmund's College, Cambridge.

Norfolk was appointed Knight Grand Cross of the Royal Victorian Order (GCVO) in the 2022 Birthday Honours.

As a member of the House of Lords, he cast only twelve votes, mostly against hunting restrictions.

As hereditary Earl Marshal, he was responsible for the arrangement of the 19 September 2022 state funeral of Queen Elizabeth II and the accession and coronation of King Charles III.

== Personal life ==
The Duke lives at Arundel Castle. As a result of a driving offence he committed in April 2022, he was disqualified from driving for six months until September of the same year. He also had several other motoring convictions, which led him to incur an excess of penalty points, resulting in a driving ban. His barrister argued in mitigation that he needed the ability to drive to organise the coronation of King Charles III.

Fitzalan-Howard hosted a luncheon event for Reform UK donors at Arundel Castle, the family's West Sussex residence, on 29 May 2026, at which Reform UK leader Nigel Farage spoke. Fitzalan-Howard stated that he was not a Reform UK supporter and had not yet decided which party he would back at the next general election. A similar event for the Conservative Party was scheduled for June, with Fitzalan-Howard citing the promotion of nature protection and awareness of insect population decline as his principal motivation for hosting such events, and expressing an interest in supporting any party that championed environmental causes.

== Family ==
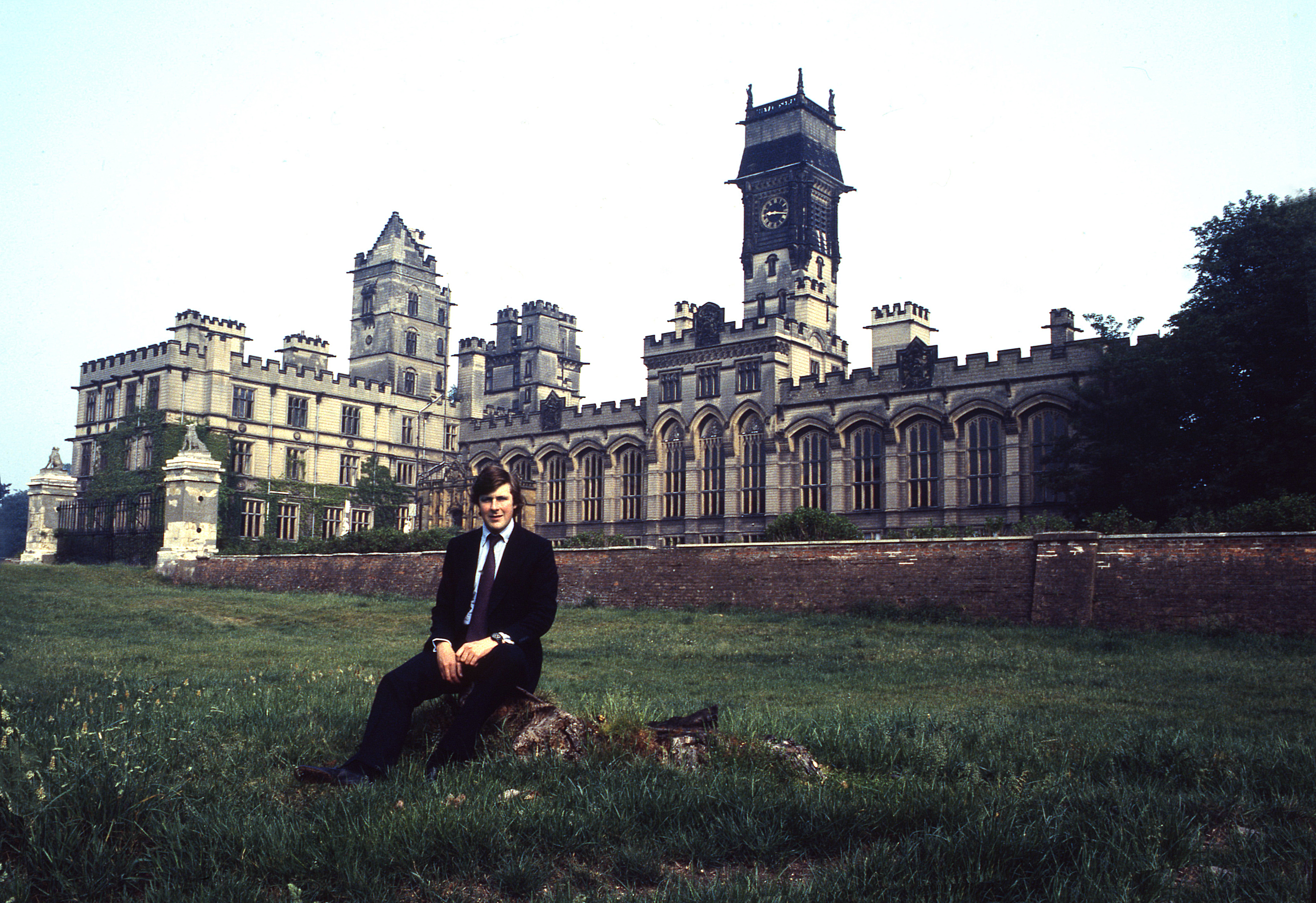
Earl of Arundel, outside Carlton Towers, by Allan Warren (1981)

A Roman Catholic, the Duke of Norfolk is the most senior Catholic layman in England. The Duke, then Earl of Arundel, married Georgina Susan Gore on 27 June 1987 at Arundel Cathedral. Together, they have three sons and two daughters:

- Henry Miles Fitzalan-Howard, Earl of Arundel (3 December 1987) who married Cecilia Mary Elizabeth dei Conti (of the Counts) Colacicchi, Nobile di Anagni on 16 July 2016. They have three daughters.
- Lady Rachel Fitzalan-Howard (10 June 1989)
- Lord Thomas Fitzalan-Howard (14 March 1992)
- Lady Isabel Fitzalan-Howard (7 February 1994)
- Lord Philip Fitzalan-Howard (14 July 1996)

The Duke and Duchess separated in 2011, but were reconciled by 2016, only to split up again; their divorce became final in 2022.

On 12 November 2022, the Duke married Francesca Herbert (née Bevan), former wife of The Hon. Henry Herbert, second son of the 7th Earl of Carnarvon.

== Titles, styles, honours and arms ==
=== Titles and styles ===
In 2002, he inherited the Dukedom of Norfolk, as well as a number of earldoms, baronies, hereditary offices, and titles attached to the Dukedom, from his father. His office of Earl Marshal, one of the Great Officers of State, makes him responsible for State occasions, such as coronations and the State Opening of Parliament. He is also, by virtue of this office, one of the hereditary judges of the Court of Chivalry and head of the College of Arms, responsible for heraldry in England and Wales as well as other parts of the Commonwealth of Nations.

==== List of peerages ====
- 18th Duke of Norfolk (Premier Duke of England)
- 36th Earl of Arundel (Premier Earl of England)
- 19th Earl of Surrey
- 16th Earl of Norfolk
- 13th Baron Beaumont
- 26th Baron Maltravers
- 16th Baron FitzAlan
- 16th Baron Clun
- 16th Baron Oswaldestre
- 5th Baron Howard of Glossop

==== List of hereditary offices ====
- Earl Marshal
- Hereditary Marshal of England
- Chief Butler of England (One of three claimants to this office before the 1902 Court of Claims. The dispute was never resolved.)

=== Honours ===
- 6 February 2002: Queen Elizabeth II Golden Jubilee Medal
- 6 February 2012: Queen Elizabeth II Diamond Jubilee Medal
- 6 February 2022: Queen Elizabeth II Platinum Jubilee Medal
- 2 June 2022: Knight Grand Cross of the Royal Victorian Order
- 6 May 2023: King Charles III Coronation Medal

=== Arms ===
Coat of arms of Edward Fitzalan-Howard, 18th Duke of Norfolk
| Adopted 1660 (by the 5th Duke of Norfolk) Coronet A Coronet of a Duke Crest 1st: Issuant from a Ducal Coronet Or a pair of Wings Gules each charged with a Bend between six Cross-crosslets fitchy Argent (Howard); 2nd: On a Chapeau Gules turned up Ermine a Lion statant gardant with tail extended Or gorged with a Ducal Coronet Argent (Thomas of Brotherton); 3rd: On a Mount Vert a Horse passant Argent holding in the mouth a Slip of Oak Vert fructed proper (Fitzalan). Escutcheon Quarterly, 1st: Gules on a Bend between six Cross-crosslets fitchy Argent an Escutcheon Or charged with a Demi-lion rampant pierced through the mouth by an arrow within a Double Tressure flory counterflory of the first (Howard); 2nd: Gules three Lions passant gardant in pale Or, Armed and Langued Azure, in chief a Label of three points Argent (Plantagenet of Norfolk); 3rd: Checky Or and Azure (Warenne); 4th: Gules a Lion rampant Or, Armed and Langued Azure (Fitzalan). Supporters Dexter a Lion, sinister a Horse both Argent the latter holding in the mouth a Slip of Oak Vert fructed proper. Motto Sola Virtus Invicta (Latin for "Virtue alone is unconquered"). Orders Circlet of the Royal Victorian Order (appointed Knight Grand Cross in 2022). Often, the coat of arms of the Duke of Norfolk appears with the Garter circlet of the Order of the Garter surrounding the shield, as seen in the arms of the 17th Duke of Norfolk. However, this is not hereditary. The 18th Duke of Norfolk, as of 2024, has not yet been appointed to the Order of the Garter. Other elements Placed behind the shield are two gold batons in saltire enamelled at the ends in black, which represent the Duke of Norfolk's office as Earl Marshal and Hereditary Marshal of England. Symbolism The shield on the bend in the first quarter of the arms was granted as an augmentation of honour by Henry VIII to the 2nd Duke of Norfolk, to commemorate his victory at the Battle of Flodden. It is a modification of the Royal coat of arms of Scotland. Instead of its normal rampant position, the lion is shown cut in half with an arrow through its mouth, commemorating the death of James IV at the battle. |

== Ancestry ==
Family tree of the Dukes of Norfolk and Suke of Surrey; Earls of Arundel, East Anglia, Norfolk, Norwich, Nottingham, and Surrey; and Barons Mowbray, Segrave and Stourton

Earl of East Anglia (Earls of Norfolk and Suffolk) (1st creation), a. 1069
Ralph the Staller c. 1011–1068; 1st Earl of Norfolk and Suffolk, or of the East Angles (Earl c. 1066/67 – 1068)
Earl of Surrey (1st creation), c. 1088
Ralph de Gael a. 1040–1100; 2nd Earl of Norfolk and Suffolk, or of the East Angles (Earl 1068–1074) | Roger Bigod (Bigot) d. 1107; Sheriff of Norfolk and Suffolk | William de Warenne c. 1035–1088; 1st Earl (of) Warenne / Earl of Surrey, Lord of Lewes, Seigneur de Varennes
Earldom forfeit, 1074
Earl of Norfolk (2nd creation), 1141
King Henry I c. 1068–1135 | Maud Bigod | William Bigod d. 1120 | Hugh Bigod; 1095–1177; 1st Earl of Norfolk (Earl 1141–1177) | William de Warenne d. 1138; 2nd Earl (of) Warenne / Earl of Surrey
Earl of Arundel, Earl of Sussex (1st creations), c. 1138
Empress Matilda c. 1102–1167 | Geoffrey Plantagenet; 1113–1251; Count of Anjou | Adeliza of Louvain c. 1103–1151 | William d'Aubigny c. 1109–1176; 1st Earl of Arundel (Sussex), Earl of Lincoln | William de Warenne; 1119–1148; 3rd Earl of Surrey
King Henry II; 1133–1189 | William d'Aubigny b. c. 1138/1150–1176; 2nd Earl of Arundel (Sussex) | Roger Bigod c. 1144/1150–1221; 2nd Earl of Norfolk (Earl 1189–1221, disputed 1177–1189) | William of Blois c. 1137–1159 | Isabel de Warenne c. 1130 – 1203; 4th Countess of Surrey suo jure | Hamelin de Warenne c. 1130–1202; Comte de Warenne / Earl of Surrey, jure uxoris
King John; 1166/1167–1216 | William d'Aubigny a. 1180–1221; 3rd Earl of Arundel (Sussex) | Hugh Bigod; 1186–1225; 3rd Earl of Norfolk (Earl 1221–1225) | Maud Marshal; 1192–1248 | William de Warenne c. 1160s/1170s–1240 5th Earl of Surrey
William d'Aubigny c. 1203–a. 1124; 4th Earl of Arundel (Sussex) | Hugh d'Aubigny d. 1243; 5th Earl of Arundel (Sussex) | Isabel d'Aubigny | John Fitzalan; 1200–1240; Lord of Clun and Oswestry | Roger Bigod c. 1209–1270; 4th Earl of Norfolk (Earl 1233–1270) | Hugh Bigod c. 1211–1266
Earl of Sussex (1st creation), 1282
King Henry III; 1207–1272 | John Fitzalan; 1223–1267; 6th Earl of Arundel (Sussex), jure matris | John de Warenne; 1231–1304; 1st Earl of Sussex (Earl of Sussex 1282–1304), 6th Earl of Surrey (Earl of Surrey 1240–1304)
Baron Segrave of Se(a)grave, 1283
Nicholas Segrave c. 1238–a. 1295; 1st Baron Segrave | King Edward I 1239–1307 | Edmund Crouchback; 1245–1296; Earl of Lancaster | John Fitzalan; 1246–1272; 7th Earl of Arundel (Sussex), jure matris | Roger Bigod c. 1245–1306; 5th Earl of Norfolk (Earl 1270–1306)
Earldom extinct, 1270
Baron Mowbray, 1283 | Earl of Arundel (2nd (1st by writ) creation), 1289
John Segrave c. 1256–1325; 2nd Baron Segrave | Roger de Mowbray; 1254–1297; 1st Baron Mowbray | Richard Fitzalan; 1267–1302; 1st (or 6th) Earl of Arundel | William de Warenne; 1256–1286
Earl of Norfolk (3rd creation), 1312
Stephen Segrave d. 1325; 3rd Baron Segrave | Thomas of Brotherton; 1300–1338; 1st Earl of Norfolk (Earl 1312–1338) | John Mowbray; 1286–1322; 2nd Baron Mowbray | Henry c. 1281–1345; Earl of Leicester, Earl of Lancaster | Edmund Fitzalan; 1286–1326; 2nd (or 7th) Earl of Arundel | Alice de Warenne; 1287–1388 heir apparent to the Earldom of Surrey | John de Warenne; 1286–1347; 7th Earl of Surrey, 2nd Earl of Sussex
Earldom of Arundel (2nd creation) forfeit, 1326 | Earldom of Sussex extinct(?), 1347
Earldom of Arundel (2nd creation) restored, 1331
John Segrave; 1315–1353; 4th Baron Segrave | Margaret of Brotherton; 1320–1399; Duchess of Norfolk "for life" (Duchess 1397–1399), 2nd Countess of Norfolk (Countess 1338–1399), | John Mowbray; 1310–1361; 3rd Baron Mowbray | Joan of Lancaster c. 1312–1349 | Eleanor of Lancaster; 1318–1372 | Richard FitzAlan c. 1313–1376; 3rd (or 8th) Earl of Arundel (Earl of Arundel 1331–1376), 8th Earl of Surrey (Earl of Surrey 1347–1376)
Baron Arundel, 1377
Elizabeth de Segrave; 1338–1368; 5th Baroness Segrave | John de Mowbray; 1340–1368; 4th Baron Mowbray | Richard FitzAlan; 1346–1397; 4th (or 9th) Earl of Arundel, 9th Earl of Surrey | John FitzAlan c. 1348–1379; 1st Baron Arundel | Alice FitzAlan
Earldom of Arundel (2nd creation) forfeit, 1397
Earl of Nottingham (1st creation), 1377 | Earl of Nottingham (2nd creation), 1383; Duke of Norfolk (1st creation), 1397 | Duke of Surrey, 1397
John de Mowbray; 1365–1383; Earl of Nottingham (Earl 1377–1383), 6th Baron Segrave, 5th Baron Mowbray (Baron 1368–1383) | Thomas de Mowbray; 1366–1399; 1st Duke of Norfolk, etc. (Duke 1397–1399), 3rd Earl of Norfolk (Earl 1399), 7th Baron Segrave, 6th Baron Mowbray (Baron 1377–1399) | Elizabeth Fitzalan; 1366–1425 | John FitzAlan; 1364–1390; 2nd Baron Arundel | Thomas Holland; 1372–1400; Duke of Surrey, Earl of Kent, Baron Holland
Earldom of Nottingham extinct, 1383 | Titles forfeit, 1399 | Dukedom of Surrey renounced, 1400
Baron Stourton, 1448 | Duke of Norfolk (1st creation restored), 1425 | Earldom of Arundel (2nd creation) restored, 1400
John Stourton; 1400–1462; 1st Baron Stourton (Baron 1448–1462) | Thomas de Mowbray; 1385–1405; 4th Earl of Norfolk, 8th Baron Segrave, 7th Baron Mowbray (Earl 1399–1405) | John de Mowbray; 1392–1432; 2nd Duke of Norfolk (Duke 1425–1432), 5th Earl of Norfolk, 9th Baron Segrave, 8th Baron Mowbray (Earl 1405–1432) | Margaret de Mowbray c. 1388–1459 | Robert Howard; 1385–1436 | Isabel de Mowbray c. 1400–1452 | Thomas FitzAlan; 1381–1415; 5th (or 10th) Earl of Arundel, 10th Earl of Surrey | John Fitzalan; 1385–1421; 6th (or 11th) Earl of Arundel, 3rd Baron Arundel, 3rd Baron Maltravers
Duke of Norfolk (4th creation), 1483
William Stourton a. 1426–1478; 2nd Baron Stourton (Baron 1462–1478) | John de Mowbray; 1415–1461; 3rd Duke of Norfolk, 6th Earl of Norfolk, 10th Baron Segrave, 9th Baron Mowbray (Duke 1432–1461) | John Howard; 1425–1485; 1st Duke of Norfolk, 13th Baron Segrave, 12th Baron Mowbray (Duke 1483–1485) | John Fitzalan; 1408–1435; 7th (or 12th) Earl of Arundel, 4th Baron Arundel, 4th Baron Maltravers | William Fitzalan; 1417–1487; 9th (or 14th) Earl of Arundel, 6th Baron Arundel, 6th Baron Maltravers
Titles forfeit, 1485
Earl of Surrey (2nd creation), 1451 | Duke of Norfolk (4th creation) restored and Earl of Surrey, 1514
John Stourton c. 1454–1485; 3rd Baron Stourton (Baron 1479–1485) | William Stourton c. 1457–1524; 5th Baron Stourton (Baron 1487–1524) | John de Mowbray; 1444–1476; 4th Duke of Norfolk, 7th Earl of Norfolk, 11th Baron Segrave, 10th Baron Mowbray (Duke 1461–1476), Earl of Surrey (Earl 1451–1476) | King Edward IV; 1442–1483 | Thomas Howard; 1443–1524; 2nd Duke of Norfolk, 1st Earl of Surrey (Duke 1514–1524) | Humfrey Fitzalan; 1429–1438; 8th (or 13th) Earl of Arundel, 5th Baron Arundel, 5th Baron Maltravers | Thomas Fitzalan; 1450–1524; 10th (or 15th) Earl of Arundel, 7th Baron Arundel, 7th Baron Maltravers
Dukedom of Norfolk, Earldom of Nottingham, Earldom of Surrey extinct, 1476
Duke of Norfolk (3rd creation), Earl of Nottingham (3rd creation), and Earl of Surrey, 1477
Francis Stourton; 1485–1487; 4th Baron Stourton (Baron 1485–1487) | Edward Stourton; 1463–1535; 6th Baron Stourton (Baron 1524–1535) | Anne de Mowbray; 1472–1481; 8th Countess of Norfolk, 12th Baroness Segrave, 11th Baroness Mowbray (Countess 1476–1481) | Richard of Shrewsbury; 1473–1483; Duke of York, Duke of Norfolk, Earl of Nottingham, Earl of Warenne (Duke 1477–1483) | Anne of York; 1475–1511 | Thomas Howard; 1473–1554; 3rd Duke of Norfolk, 2nd Earl of Surrey (Duke 1524–1554) | Edmund Howard c. 1478–1539 | Elizabeth Boleyn c. 1480–1538 | William Fitzalan; 1476–1544; 11th (or 16th) Earl of Arundel, 8th Baron Arundel, 8th Baron Maltravers
Earldom of Norfolk extinct and Baronies Segrave and Mowbray in abeyance, 1481 | Dukedom of Norfolk, Earldom of Nottingham, Earldom of Surrey extinct, 1483 | Attainted, 1547; Restored, 1553
William Stourton c. 1505–1548; 7th Baron Stourton | Earl of Nottingham (5th creation), 1525 | King Henry VIII; 1491–1547 | Anne Boleyn c. 1501 or 1507–1536
Viscount Howard of Bindon, 1559
Charles Stourton c. 1520–1557; 8th Baron Stourton | Henry Howard; 1517–1547 styled Earl of Surrey | Thomas Howard c. 1520–1582; 1st Viscount Howard of Bindon | Mary FitzRoy; 1519–1557 | Henry FitzRoy; 1519–1536; Duke of Richmond and Somerset, Earl of Nottingham | Catherine Howard c. 1524–1542 | Henry Fitzalan; 1512–1580; 12th (or 17th) Earl of Arundel, 9th Baron Arundel, 9th Baron Maltravers
Earldom of Nottingham extinct, 1536
Thomas Howard; 1536–1572; 4th Duke of Norfolk, 3rd Earl of Surrey, 13th Baron Mowbray (Duke 1554–1572) | Henry Howard; 1540–1614; Earl of Northampton | Queen Elizabeth I 1533–1603 | Mary FitzAlan; 1540–1557
Dukedom (3rd creation) forfeit, 1572
Earl of Arundel (3rd creation), 1580 | Earl of Suffolk (4th creation), 1603
John Stourton; 1553–1588; 9th Baron Stourton | Edward Stourton c. 1555–1633; 10th Baron Stourton | Philip Howard; 1557–1595; 20th/13th/1st Earl of Arundel, styled Earl of Surrey | Thomas Howard; 1561–1626; Earl of Suffolk | Lord William Howard; 1563–1640
Earldom of Arundel and Barony of Mowbray attainted, 1589 | see Earls, Marquesses, and Dukes of Suffolk family tree
Earl of Arundel (3rd creation) and Barony of Mowbray restored, 1604; Earl of Norfolk (5th creation), 1644
William Stourton c. 1594–1672; 11th Baron Stourton | Thomas Howard; 1585–1646; 21st/14th/2nd Earl of Arundel, 2nd/4th Earl of Surrey, 1st Earl of Norfolk, 14th Baron Mowbray (Earl 1644–1646) | Philip
see Earls of Shrewsbury family tree
Edward Stourton; 1617–1644 | Alethea Talbot; 1585–1654; 17th Baroness Strange of Blackmere, 14th Baroness Talbot, 13th Baroness Furnivall | Henry Frederick Howard; 1608–1652; 22nd/15th/3rd Earl of Arundel, 3rd/5th Earl of Surrey, 2nd Earl of Norfolk, 15th Baron Mowbray (Earl 1646–1652) | William Howard; 1614–1680; Viscount Stafford | William
Duke of Norfolk (4th creation restored), 1660 | Baron Howard of Castle Rising, 1669; Earl of Norwich (3rd creation), 1672
William Stourton d. 1685; 12th Baron Stourton | Thomas Howard; 1627–1677; 5th Duke of Norfolk, 21st/14th/2nd Earl of Arundel, 4th/6th Earl of Surrey, 16th Baron Mowbray (Duke 1660–1677) 18th Baron Strange of Blackmere, 15th Baron Talbot, 14th Baron Furnivall (Baron 1654–1677) | Henry Howard; 1628–1684; 6th Duke of Norfolk, 22nd/15th/3rd Earl of Arundel, 5th/7th Earl of Surrey; 18th Baron Strange of Blackmere, 17th Baron Mowbray, 15th Baron Talbot, 14th Baron Furnivall (Duke 1677–1684) 1st Earl of Norwich, etc. (Earl 1672–1684) | Charles Howard; 1630–1713 | Col. Bernard Howard; 1641–1717 | Charles Howard; 1628–1685; Earl of Carlisle
Edward Stourton; 1665–1720; 13th Baron Stourton | Thomas Stourton; 1667–1744; 14th Baron Stourton | Charles Stourton; 1669–1739 | Henry Howard; 1655–1701; 7th Duke of Norfolk, 22nd/15th/3rd Earl of Arundel, 5th/7th Earl of Surrey, 2nd Earl of Norwich, etc. 18th Baron Mowbray, 19th Baron Strange of Blackmere, 15th Baron Talbot, 14th Baron Furnivall (Duke 1684–1701) | Lord Thomas Howard; 1662–1689 | Henry Charles Howard d. 1720
Thomas Howard; 1683–1732; 8th Duke of Norfolk, 23rd/16th/4th Earl of Arundel, 6th/8th Earl of Surrey, 3rd Earl of Norwich, etc. 18th Baron Strange of Blackmere, 15th Baron Talbot, 14th Baron Furnivall, 19th Baron Mowbray (Duke 1701–1732) | Edward Howard; 1685–1777; 9th Duke of Norfolk, 24th/17th/5th Earl of Arundel, 7th/9th Earl of Surrey, 4th Earl of Norwich, etc. 20th Baron Mowbray, 20th Baron Strange of Blackmere, 15th Baron Talbot, 14th Baron Furnivall (Duke 1732–1777) | Philip Howard; 1688–1750 | Bernard Howard; 1674–1735
Earldom of Norwich (3rd creation) and Barony of Howard of Castle Rising extinct and Baronies of Furnivall, Mowbray, Segrave, Strange of Blackmere, and Talbot abeyant, 1777
Charles Stourton; 1702–1753; 15th Baron Stourton | William Stourton; 1704–1781; 16th Baron Stourton | Winifred Howard; 1726–1753 | Anne Howard; 1742–1787 | Charles Howard; 1720–1786; 10th Duke of Norfolk, 25th/18th/6th Earl of Arundel, 8th/10th Earl of Surrey (Duke 1777–1786) | Henry Howard; 1713–1787
Charles Philip Stourton; 1752–1816; 17th Baron Stourton | Charles Howard; 1746–1815; 11th Duke of Norfolk, 26th/19th/7th Earl of Arundel, 9th/11th Earl of Surrey (Duke 1786–1815)
William Stourton; 1776–1846; 18th Baron Stourton | Bernard Howard; 1765–1842; 12th Duke of Norfolk, 27th/20th/8th Earl of Arundel, 10th/12th Earl of Surrey (Duke 1815–1842) | Henry Howard-Molyneux-Howard; 1766–1824
Charles Stourton; 1802–1872; 19th Baron Stourton | Henry Howard; 1791–1856; 13th Duke of Norfolk, 28th/21st/9th Earl of Arundel, 11th/13th Earl of Surrey (Duke 1842–1856) | Henry Howard-Molyneux-Howard; 1802–1875
Baron Mowbray and Baron Segrave abeayance restored, 1878 | Baron Howard of Glossop, 1869
Alfred Joseph Stourton; 1829–1893; 24th Baron Segrave, 21st/23rd Baron Mowbray, 20th Baron Stourton | Henry Granville Fitzalan-Howard; 1815–1860; 14th Duke of Norfolk, 29th/22nd/10th Earl of Arundel, 12th/14th Earl of Surrey (Duke 1856–1860) | Edward George Fitzalan-Howard; 1818–1883; 1st Baron Howard of Glossop
Baron Howard of Penrith, 1830
Charles Botolph Joseph Stourton; 1867–1936; 25th Baron Segrave, 22nd/24th Baron Mowbray, 21st Baron Stourton | Henry Fitzalan-Howard; 1847–1917; 15th Duke of Norfolk, 30th/23rd/11th Earl of Arundel, 13th/15th Earl of Surrey, Lord Maltravers, Earl of Arundel and Surrey (Duke 1860–1917) | Francis Fitzalan-Howard; 1859–1924; 2nd Baron Howard of Glossop | Esmé Howard; 1863–1939; 1st Baron Howard of Penrith
William Marmaduke Stourton; 1895–1965; 26th Baron Segrave, 23rd/25th Baron Mowbray, 22nd Baron Stourton | Bernard Fitzalan-Howard; 1908–1975; 16th Duke of Norfolk, 31st/24th/12th Earl of Arundel, 14th/16th Earl of Surrey (Duke 1917–1975) | Bernard Edward Fitzalan-Howard; 1885–1972; 3rd Baron Howard of Glossop | Francis Howard; 1905–1999; 2nd Baron Howard of Penrith
Charles Edward Stourton; 1923–2006; 27th Baron Segrave, 24th/26th Baron Mowbray, 23rd Baron Stourton | Miles Fitzalan-Howard; 1915–2002; 17th Duke of Norfolk, 32nd/25th/13th Earl of Arundel, 15th/17th Earl of Surrey, 4th Baron Howard of Glossop (Duke 1975–2002) m. Mary Teresa Constable-Maxwell
Edward William Stephen Stourton; 1953–2021; 28th Baron Segrave, 25th/27th Baron Mowbray, 24th Baron Stourton | Marsha Howard b. 1953 | Edward Fitzalan-Howard b. 1956; 18th Duke of Norfolk, 33rd/26th/14th Earl of Arundel, 16th/18th Earl of Surrey, 5th Baron Howard of Glossop (from 2002) m. Georgina Susan Gore | Philip Esmé Howard b. 1945; 3rd Baron Howard of Penrith
Sarah Louise Stourton b. 1982 | Isabella Laura Stourton b. 1983 | Camilla Charlotte Stourton b. 1987 | Francesca Jane Stourton b. 1988 | James Charles Peter Stourton b. 1991; 29th Baron Segrave, 26th/28th Baron Mowbray, 25th Baron Stourton | Henry Fitzalan-Howard b. 1987 styled Earl of Arundel and Surrey | Thomas Philip Howard b. 1974
Co-heir presumptive to the Baronies Segrave, Mowbray, and Stourton | Co-heir presumptive to the Baronies Segrave, Mowbray, and Stourton | Co-heir presumptive to the Baronies Segrave, Mowbray, and Stourton | Co-heir presumptive to the Baronies Segrave, Mowbray, and Stourton | Heir apparent to the dukedom | Heir apparent to the Barony Howard of Penrith

Political offices
| Preceded by The 17th Duke of Norfolk | Earl Marshal; 2002–present | Incumbent |
Peerage of England
| Preceded by Miles Stapleton-Fitzalan-Howard, 17th Duke of Norfolk | Duke of Norfolk; 2002–present | Incumbent |
Order of precedence in England and Wales
| Preceded by The Lord Carrington as Lord Great Chamberlain | Gentlemen; Earl Marshal | Succeeded by The Earl of Rosslyn as Lord Steward |
Order of precedence in Scotland
| Preceded by The Duke of Argyll as Master of the Household of Scotland | Gentlemen; Duke of Norfolk | Succeeded by The Duke of Somerset |
Order of precedence in Northern Ireland
| Preceded by The Lord Carrington as Lord Great Chamberlain | Gentlemen; Earl Marshal | Succeeded by The Duke of Somerset |
