= Hambleton District Council elections =

Local government elections in North Yorkshire, England

Hambleton District Council in North Yorkshire, England, was established in 1974 and abolished in 2023. It was elected every four years.

== Political control ==
The first election to the council was held in 1973, initially operating as a shadow authority alongside the outgoing authorities until it came into its powers on 1 April 1974. Political control from 1974 until its abolition in 2023 was as follows:

Party in control	Years
Independent	1974–1987
No overall control	1987–1999
Conservative	1999–2023

=== Leadership ===
The leaders of the council from 2010 until the council's abolition in 2023 were:

Councillor	Party	From	To
Neville Huxtable	Conservative	2010	14 May 2013
Mark Robson	Conservative	14 May 2013	31 Mar 2023

== Council elections ==
- 1973 Hambleton District Council election
- 1976 Hambleton District Council election
- 1979 Hambleton District Council election (New ward boundaries)
- 1983 Hambleton District Council election
- 1987 Hambleton District Council election
- 1991 Hambleton District Council election (District boundary changes took place but the number of seats remained the same)
- 1995 Hambleton District Council election
- 1999 Hambleton District Council election
- 2003 Hambleton District Council election (New ward boundaries)
- 2007 Hambleton District Council election
- 2011 Hambleton District Council election
- 2015 Hambleton District Council election (New ward boundaries)
- 2019 Hambleton District Council election

== Results maps ==
2003 results map

2007 results map

2011 results map

2015 results map

2019 results map

== Council composition ==
Year	Conservative	Liberal Democrats	Labour	UKIP	Independent	Council control after election
2003	36	3	1	0	4	Conservative
2007	39	2	0	0	3	Conservative
2011	39	2	0	0	3	Conservative
2015	27	0	0	1	0	Conservative
2019	24	1	1	0	2	Conservative

== By-election results ==
=== 1995-1999 ===
Stokesley By-Election 7 April 1998
Party	Candidate	Votes	%	±%
Conservative	Michael Richardson	866	50.3	+16.7
Liberal Democrats	Jacqueline Griffiths	621	36.1	−6.9
Labour	Frances Mayes	235	13.6	−9.9
Majority		245	14.2	
Turnout		1,722	40.0	
Conservative hold		Swing		

Romanby By-Election 17 December 1998
Party	Candidate	Votes	%	±%
Conservative	John Smith	381	57.4	
Labour	Charles Hutchings	283	42.6	
Majority		98	14.8	
Turnout		664	23.5	
Conservative hold		Swing		

=== 1999-2003 ===
Morton-on-Swale By-Election 8 November 2001
Party	Candidate	Votes	%	±%
Conservative	Brian Phillips	418	74.1	+3.6
Labour	Charles Hutchings	146	25.9	+3.6
Majority		272	48.2	
Turnout		564	42.0	
Conservative hold		Swing		

=== 2003-2007 ===
Thirsk By-Election 18 May 2006
Party	Candidate	Votes	%	±%
Conservative	Derek Adamson	700	61.0	+34.2
Liberal Democrats	Robert Adamson	286	24.9	+5.8
Labour	Claire Tupling	161	14.0	−10.9
Majority		414	36.1	
Turnout		1,147	25.5	
Conservative hold		Swing		

=== 2007-2011 ===
Northallerton Broomfield By-Election 4 October 2007
Party	Candidate	Votes	%	±%
Conservative	Peter Wilkinson	unopposed		
Conservative hold		Swing		

Cowtons By-Election 4 June 2009
Party	Candidate	Votes	%	±%
Conservative	Stephen Watson	unopposed		
Conservative hold		Swing		

Swainby By-Election 4 June 2009
Party	Candidate	Votes	%	±%
Conservative	David Hugill	477	60.8	−12.3
Liberal Democrats	Rosemary Dalton	275	35.0	+8.1
Labour	Gerald Ramsden	33	4.2	+4.2
Majority		202	25.7	
Turnout		785		
Conservative hold		Swing		

Tollerton By-Election 4 June 2009
Party	Candidate	Votes	%	±%
Conservative	Julie Moody	413	64.3	N/A
Liberal Democrats	Robert Adamson	229	35.7	N/A
Majority		184	28.7	
Turnout		642		
Conservative hold		Swing		

=== 2011-2015 ===
Whitestonecliffe By-Election 2 May 2013
Party	Candidate	Votes	%	±%
Conservative	Janet Watson	507	80.9	N/A
Labour	Abbie O'Neill	120	19.1	N/A
Majority		387	61.7	
Turnout		627		
Conservative hold		Swing		

Topcliffe By-Election 12 December 2013
Party	Candidate	Votes	%	±%
Conservative	Garry Key	unopposed		
Conservative hold		Swing		

=== 2015-2019 ===
Northallerton South By-Election 26 May 2016
Party	Candidate	Votes	%	±%
Conservative	Caroline Dickinson	541	48.0	−0.5
Labour	David Tickle	232	20.6	−4.8
UKIP	David Tickle	222	19.7	−6.4
Yorkshire First	Chris Pearson	133	11.8	+11.8
Majority		309	27.4	
Turnout		1,128		
Conservative hold		Swing		

Thirsk By-Election 4 October 2018
Party	Candidate	Votes	%	±%
Conservative	Dave Elders	679	65.4	−0.4
Labour	David Tickle	251	24.2	+24.2
Yorkshire	Stewart Barber	108	10.4	+10.4
Majority		428	41.2	
Turnout		1,038		
Conservative hold		Swing		

=== 2019-2023 ===
Raskelf and White Horse By-election 25 November 2021
Party	Candidate	Votes	%	±%
Conservative	Philippa James	288	55.7	−2.9
Liberal Democrats	Neil Beckwith	127	24.6	N/A
Green	Adam Harper	102	19.7	−21.7
Majority		161	31.1	
Turnout		521	18.7	
Conservative hold		Swing	▼13.8	
