= Aiskew and Leeming Bar =

Civil parish in North Yorkshire, England

Coordinates: 54.298°N 1.578°W

- Civil parish
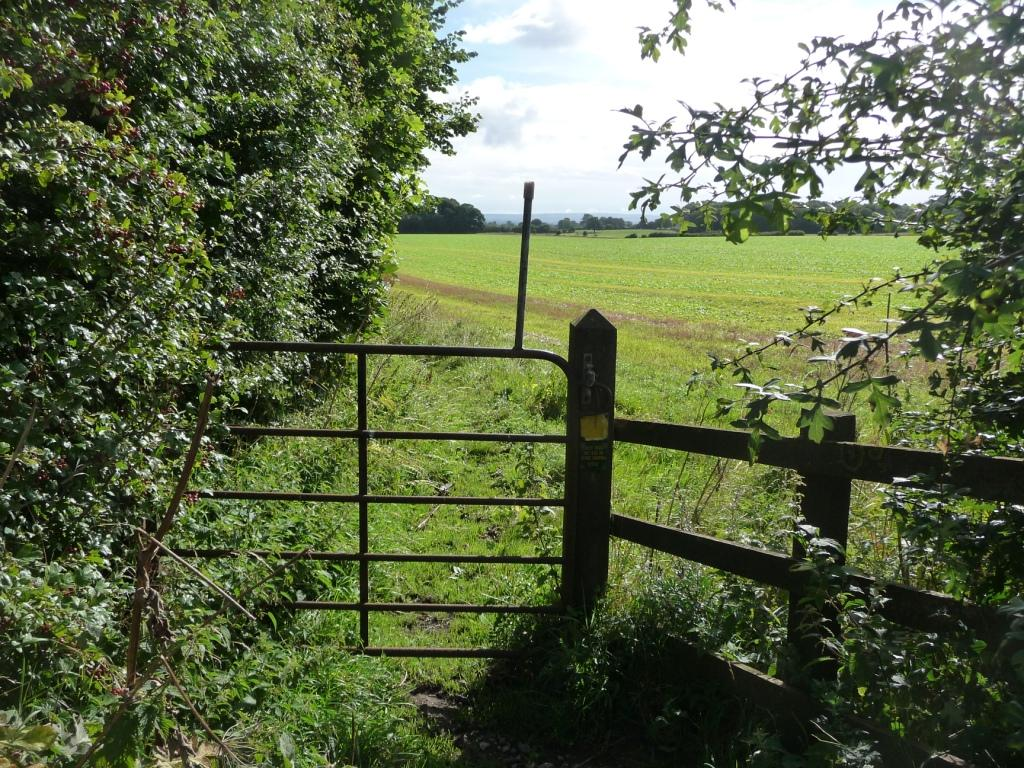
- Footpath to Scruton, east from Aiskew Moor

- Location within North Yorkshire
- Population: 2,427 (2011 census)
- OS grid reference: SE287908
- Unitary authority: North Yorkshire
- Ceremonial county: North Yorkshire
- Region: Yorkshire and the Humber
- Country: England
- Sovereign state: United Kingdom

Aiskew and Leeming Bar is a civil parish within the Bedale ward of North Yorkshire, England. The parish only has two settlements (Aiskew and Leeming Bar), but prior to the changes in the 19th century, the area it contains belonged to the parish of Bedale. At the 2011 Census, the population of the parish was 2,427.

== History ==
Aiskew village is mentioned in the Domesday Book, but Leeming Bar came about after the Domesday survey, being a point on the crossroads of the Great North Road and the turnpike road to Kendal.

A large part of the parish on the western, southern, and eastern sides has a boundary division through Bedale Beck; This means that certain buildings deemed to be in Bedale, such as the Bedale signalbox and railway station and the Leech House, are actually within the parish of Aiskew and Leeming Bar.

A bypass for the A684 road between Leeming Bar and Bedale was built in 2016 to connect with Junction 51 of the A1(M) motorway. At that time, over 14,000 vehicles a day were using the road, which significantly reduced traffic flow through Leeming Bar and Aiskew (on a west-east axis). There are only two settlements in the parish: Aiskew and Leeming Bar. An area of the parish known as Aiskew Moor is in the planning stages to be developed from fields into an industrial estate. Between 2010 and 2021, new housing estates have been built in the parish; between 2013 and 2015, the number of houses increased by 25% (up from 962 to 1,200).

== Local authority ==
Aiskew and Leeming Bar civil parish is part of the Bedale Ward of North Yorkshire Council. At the 2011 census, the ward had a population of 4,606. Historically, it was in the Liberty of Richmondshire and the wapentake of Hang East, though it was not separated out from the large Bedale Parish of 8,000 acres (3,200 ha) until 1866. Previous to becoming its own parish, when it was within Bedale Parish, it was afforded the status of township. The Aiskew township also consisted of the hamlet of Little Leeming, which was another name for Leeming Bar.

At the 2001 census (which lists the parish simply as Aiskew), the population was 2,136. At the 2011 census, this had increased to 2,427. In 2015, North Yorkshire County Council estimated that the number had dropped to 2,310.

The Aiskew and Leeming Bar Parish Council was under threat in the 2003 local elections after several members did not stand for re-election. This stemmed from a government ruling about declarations of interest by local councillors. Also, in 2017, an unsuccessful petition called for the amalgamation of the parish council with Bedale Parish Council. In 2018, a request was passed to Hambleton District Council (HDC) to rename the parish from simply Aiskew to Aiskew and Leeming Bar. The request for the name change, which was granted, was because the new name would reflect the actual geographical area of the parish.

From 1974 to 2023 it was part of the Hambleton District, it is now administered by the unitary North Yorkshire Council.

== See also ==
- Listed buildings in Aiskew and Leeming Bar
