= Bedale Leech House =

Leech livestck house in Bedale, North Yorkshire, England

- The Leech House
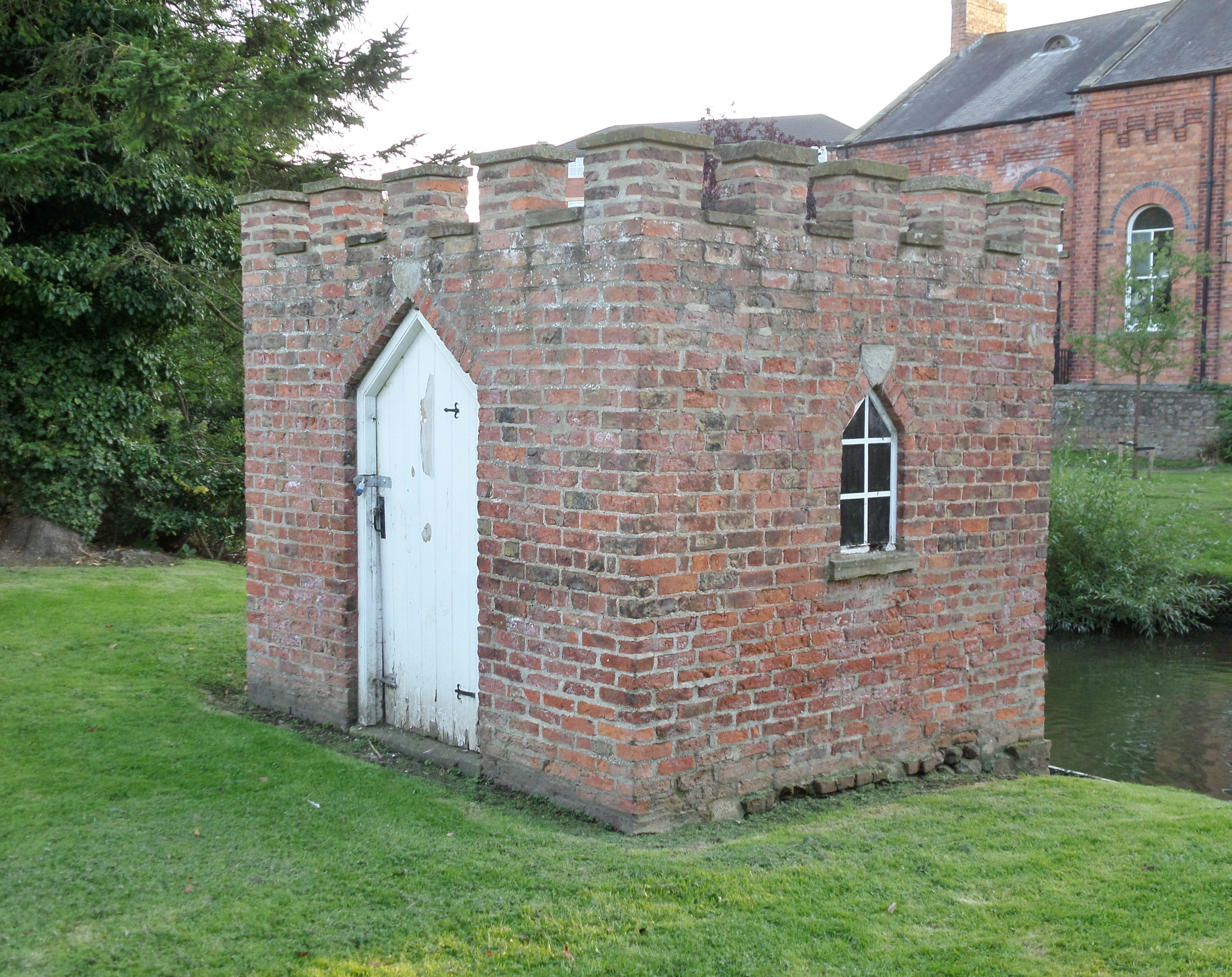
- The Bedale Leech House

- Location within North Yorkshire

General information
- Type: Leech House
- Location: Bedale, North Yorkshire, England
- Coordinates: 54.289178°N 1.5895870°W
- Completed: 19th century
- Owner: Bedale Heritage Trust

Height
- Height: 3.25 m (10.7 ft)

Dimensions
- Diameter: 3.07 m (10.1 ft)

Listed Building – Grade II
- Designated: 25 September 1985
- Reference no.: 1150909

This late Georgian Bedale Leech House in Bedale, North Yorkshire, England, is a unique example of a building constructed to keep live medicinal leeches (Hirudo medicinalis) healthy prior to their sale by the local apothecary to doctors and private individuals for the purpose of blood letting as a medical procedure to cure or prevent a variety of illnesses and diseases.

== The Leech house ==
The 'Leechery' is a small brick castellated structure, measuring 10.7 feet (3.25 m) by 10.1 feet (3.07 m), which stands on the east bank of the Bedale Beck. It was restored by the Bedale District Heritage Trust in 1985 and sits in a quarter of an acre of gardens known as the 'Bedale Renaissance Park' with an information board that explains its history and significance. It was built by an apothecary on the estate of the Beresford-Peirse family of Bedale Hall in the late 18th or early 19th century and was used for storing leeches until the early 1900s.

=== Operation ===
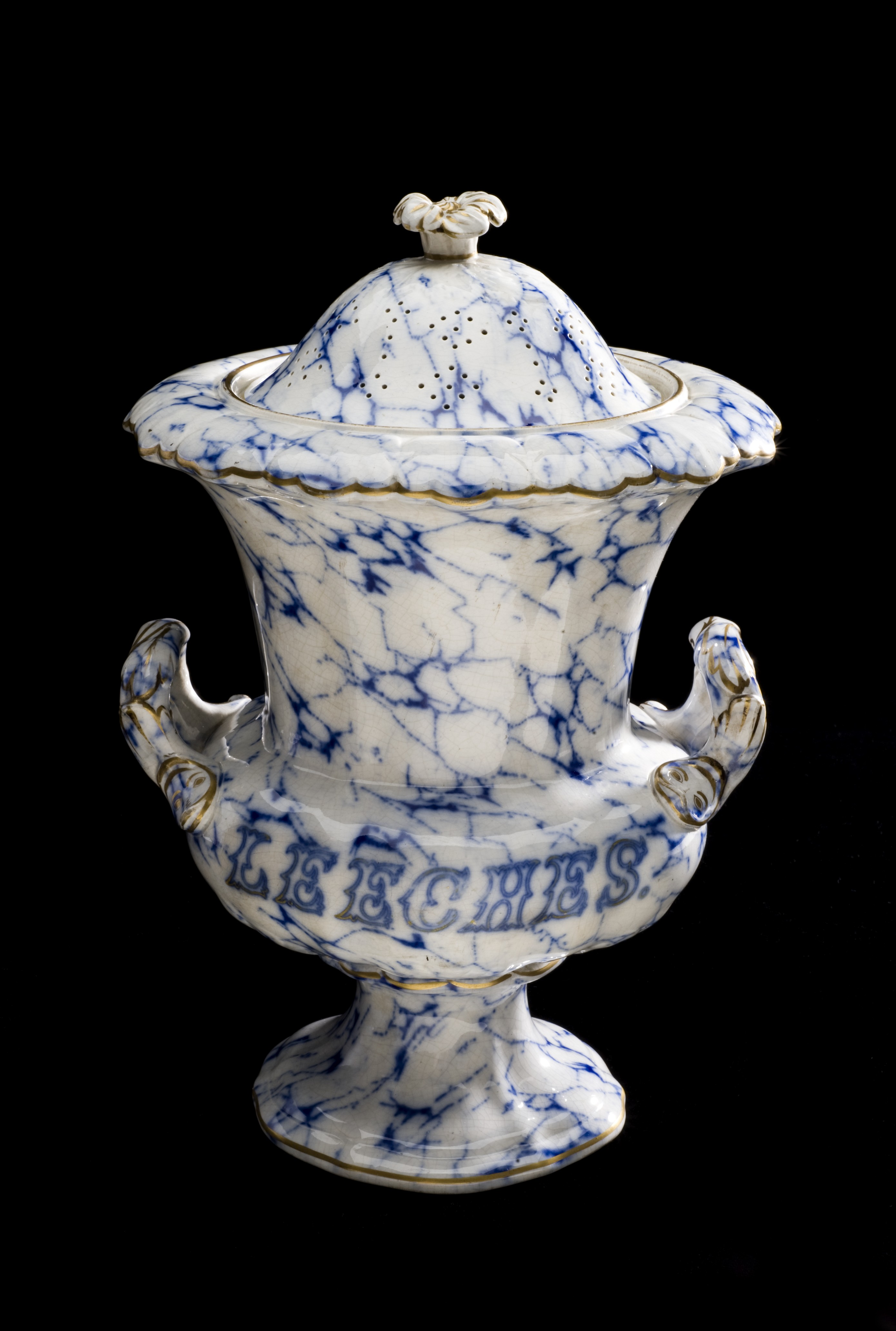
A 19th century leech jar.

The leeches were kept in special containers of moist turf and moss and a flow of fresh water from Bedale Beck was diverted through the building. A fireplace provided heat to ensure the containers and the leeches within did not freeze in winter. Specialized and often very ornate 'Leech Jars' with a secure lid and small air holes were used for the storage of leeches in the apothecary's shop. Feeding was not usually necessary as leeches can survive for up to a year between meals.

The leeches were collected using either horses or, frequently, the legs of the leech collectors themselves. A leech was removed after it had taken a full meal of blood. Bogs and marshes were the best collecting areas; the Lake District and Somerset Levels had particularly suitable sites. Women were particularly associated with collecting leeches and transporting them in small boxes or cages. It was not until 1835 that a method of breeding medicinal leeches was perfected in France; however, the British showed little interest in this, even though the native stocks were in decline or nearing extinction.

George Thornton was the Bedale leech gatherer and was employed by Mr Bellamy, a local pharmacist or apothecary. Special pewter boxes were developed into which the leeches were placed once sold.

The use of leeches in medicine reached a peak between 1825 and 1850 to the point that supplies became scarce and a secure place to store them before use became desirable. By the 1900s the use of leeches in medicine had dramatically declined and Bedale Leech House ceased to be used for their storage, though it was restored in 1985. In the same year as its restoration it was noted by Historic England as being a grade II listed building.

== See also ==
- Listed buildings in Aiskew and Leeming Bar
