= Harrogate Spring Water =

Bottled water company in North Yorkshire, England

- Country: England
- Introduced: 1740
- Source: Harrogate
- Type: Still, sparkling
- Sodium (Na): 7.4
- Sulfate (SO_{4}): 8.2
- Website: https://www.harrogatespring.com
- All concentrations in milligrams per liter (mg/L); pH without units

Harrogate Spring Water is a brand of spring water first sold in 1740 by Harrogate water. That company was incorporated on 16 August 2000 by Danone which manufactures plastic and glass bottled spring water, from Harrogate, North Yorkshire, England and distributes its bottles all over the world. Spa waters were first discovered in Harrogate in the 16th century, with water bottled in glass only for the town from the 1740s.

== Sources ==
The main spring is sourced from an aquifer in the millstone grit series, below the Harrogate Pinewoods. The Thirsty Planet brand takes water from an aquifer located in sand and gravel.

== History ==
Founded in the 18th century the company was bought out by Danone in August 2000, initially under the name HSW Limited, the product was launched in January 2002. Harrogate Spa Water manufactures bottled water and sells it locally, nationally and internationally, being exported to as far away as Australia.

A change in majority share owner distribution was made during 2020 resulting in Danone becoming the majority holder, displacing the Cain family from their ownership.

The company was previously owned by Harrogate Water Brands, which also owned the charity Thirsty Planet, producing its own brand of bottled water.

In 2021, a plan to expand the bottling plant over an area of woodland was criticised by Harrogate residents because Harrogate Spring Water sought to destroy an area of established woodland and natural habitat planted in 2005 by volunteers and local primary school children.

== Market ==
In the United Kingdom, Harrogate Spring Water sold over 43,000,000 litres (9,500,000 imp gal; 11,000,000 US gal) annually in 2013, which was a market share of 1.4%. In 2019, the company achieved sales of £21.6 million. Airlines including British Airways, Virgin Atlantic, Jet2.com, TUI Airways, and Easyjet provide or sell Harrogate Water on their flights, and, in the case of British Airways, in their premium lounges at London Heathrow. They also supply Cunard for their ships.

Harrogate Spring Water also supply water to the Masons Gin distillery in Aiskew, North Yorkshire.
