= Listed buildings in Aiskew and Leeming Bar =

Aiskew and Leeming Bar is a civil parish in the county of North Yorkshire, England. It contains 15 listed buildings that are recorded in the National Heritage List for England. One is listed at Grade II*, the middle of the three grades, and the others are Grade II, the lowest grade. The parish contains the villages of Aiskew and Leeming Bar and the surrounding area. Most of the listed buildings are houses and associated structures, and the others include a bridge, a building for housing leeches, a works and a garage, a railway station, a locomotive shed and signal box and a former police station.

== Key ==
| Grade | Criteria |
|---|---|
| II* | Particularly important buildings of more than special interest |
| II | Buildings of national importance and special interest |

== Buildings ==
| Name and location | Photograph | Date | Notes | Grade |
|---|---|---|---|---|
| Aiskew House; 54.29379°N 1.58077°W | — | 1734 | The house is rendered with stone dressings, wide eaves, and a stone slate roof with stone coped gables, and shaped kneelers. There are three storeys, a double-range plan, and five bays. Steps lead up to a central doorway in a Doric porch, with two pilasters, two columns, a frieze, a cornice and a blocking course. The windows are sashes with stone sills. | II |
| Dovecote east of Aiskew House; 54.29380°N 1.58043°W | — | Early to mid 18th century | The dovecote is in red brick with a pyramidal tile roof. There are two storeys and a square plan, and it contains a doorway. On the top is a square cupola with round arches, and a shaped finial. | II |
| Leases Hall; 54.31672°N 1.57141°W | — | c. 1740 | Originally a coaching inn, it was later extended and converted into a country house. It is roughcast, with stone dressings, a floor band and stone slate roofs. There are three storeys, a central block of five bays with an eaves band, and flanking outer bays with embattled parapets and hipped roofs. In the centre is a doorway, and the windows are sashes. On the outer bays are two-storey canted bay windows with friezes and hipped roofs. At the rear is a round-headed stair window, and the outer bays project to form bowed wings. | II |
| Lindum Cottage; 54.29340°N 1.58041°W | — | Mid to late 18th century | Two houses combined into one, in red brick with an eaves band and a tile roof. There are two storeys and four bays. The doorway and the windows, which are sashes, have flat brick arches. | II |
| Aiskew Mill; 54.28848°N 1.58580°W | | Late 18th century | The water mill is in red brick with stone dressings, quoins, and a hipped pantile roof. There are three storeys, a central block of three bays, and outshuts, one housing a waterwheel. The openings include doorways and sash windows, some of which are horizontally-sliding. Inside is wooden machinery and two sets of millstones. | II* |
| Beechwood House; 54.29087°N 1.58670°W | — | Late 18th century | The house is rendered, with an eaves band and a stone slate roof. There are three storeys and three bays. In the centre is a doorway with pilasters, a fanlight with radial glazing bars in a moulded architrave, consoles, and an open pediment. The windows are sashes with stone sills. | II |
| Ice House, Leases Hall; 54.31905°N 1.57367°W | — | Late 18th century | The ice house is in red brick. It consists of a circular domed chamber partially buried underground and has a short brick entrance passage. | II |
| Leeming Bridge; 54.30190°N 1.55074°W | | Late 18th century | The bridge carries Roman Road over Bedale Beck. It is in stone and consists of a single segmental arch with voussoirs, a band and a coped parapet. | II |
| The Leech House; 54.28920°N 1.58961°W | | Late 18th century | The building was built to house leeches for medicinal use. It is in red brick with an embattled parapet and a lead roof. It has a single storey, a single bay and a square plan. The doorway has a triangular head and a stone keystone and the windows on the other sides are small and also have triangular heads and keystones. | II |
| Warwick House; 54.29376°N 1.57968°W | — | Early 19th century | The house is in red brick on a stone plinth, with an eaves band and a hipped tile roof. There are two storeys and three bays. The central doorway has a moulded architrave, and a fanlight with radial glazing bars. To its right is a canted bay window with a cornice, at the rear is a round-arched stair window, and the other windows are sashes with flat brick arches. | II |
| John Gill agricultural works and garage 54.30510°N 1.55943°W | | c. 1840–50 | The works is in red brick with an asbestos roof, and has an L-shaped plan. It consists of a two-storey block with three bays, and a single-storey wing at right angles with eight bays. Along the wing is an arcade of elliptical arches, four of which contain metal-framed windows. The main block has a wide gable and a floor band. In the upper floor, the outer bays have round-arched recesses containing windows, between which is a blind recess with a pointed arch, the lower floor has three blind segmental-arched recesses, and all have panelled aprons. | II |
| Leeming Bar railway station 54.30535°N 1.56073°W | | 1848 | The station was built by the York, Newcastle and Berwick Railway and designed by G. T. Andrews. It is in red brick with oversailing eaves and hipped Welsh slate roofs. The main block has two storeys and four bays, the right bay projecting, and a single-storey two-bay former waiting room. In the main block is a doorway with a fanlight, and sash windows, all with cambered arches, and a continuous sill band. To the left is a canted bay window, and on the left return is a two-bay Doric porch with a frieze, a cornice, and a blocking course. | II |
| Locomotive shed 54.30496°N 1.56121°W | | c. 1848 | The former locomotive shed is in red brick on a plinth, with oversailing eaves and a hipped pyramidal Welsh slate roof. There is a single storey, a square plan, two bays, and a lower single-bay wing. The openings have round-arched heads, and include wagon openings, sash windows, and two large lunette windows. | II |
| Signal Box; 54.28970°N 1.58895°W | | c. 1860 | The signal box was built for the Northallerton to Bedale line. It is in brick with stone dressings, a slate roof, and two storeys. The northeast front has three round-arched windows in the ground floor, and in the upper floor are two sash windows and a cast iron balcony. The southeast front has a doorway in each floor and external wooden steps to the upper doorway, to the right of which is a sash window. The upper floor of the southwest front has two round-arched windows. | II |
| Police Station; 54.29032°N 1.58743°W | — | 1904 | The former police station and courthouse were designed by Walter Brierley, and later converted for residential use. The building is in stone with a stone slate roof. There are two storeys and two ranges, one with four bays, and the other at right angles, with two bays. Each range has a doorway with a four-centred arch and a chamfered surround, and the windows are mullioned or mullioned and transomed. The main range has a moulded string course stepped over the doorway and bracketed eaves, and the doorway has a moulded and quoined surround. The other range has a plinth, and on the gable end is a coat of arms in a Doric surround, a sill on consoles, pilasters with obelisks above, an inscribed frieze and a cornice. Under the coat of arms is an inscription and the date. | II |
