= Aiskew =

Village in North Yorkshire, England

Coordinates: 54°17′35″N 1°34′54″W

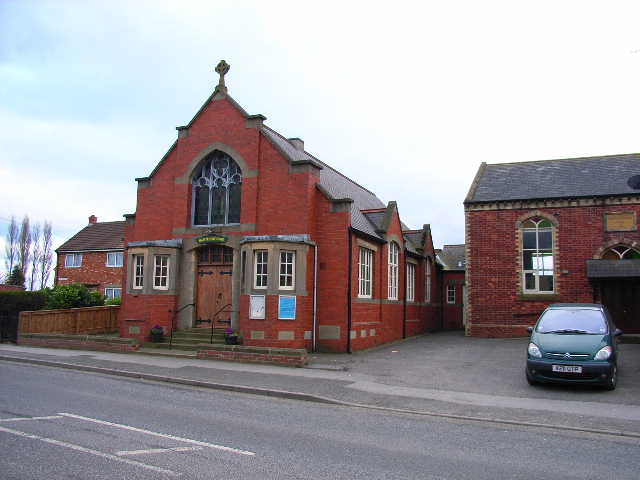
- Aiskew Methodist Church

- Location within North Yorkshire
- Population: 2,427 (2011 Census)
- OS grid reference: SE271885
- Civil parish: Aiskew and Leeming Bar
- Unitary authority: North Yorkshire
- Ceremonial county: North Yorkshire
- Region: Yorkshire and the Humber
- Country: England
- Sovereign state: United Kingdom
- Post town: BEDALE
- Postcode district: DL8
- Dialling code: 01677
- Police: North Yorkshire
- Fire: North Yorkshire
- Ambulance: Yorkshire
- UK Parliament: Thirsk and Malton

Aiskew is a village in the civil parish of Aiskew and Leeming Bar, in North Yorkshire, England. The village is situated to the immediate north-east of Bedale and separated from it by Bedale Beck.

== History ==
Remains of a Roman villa were unearthed in 2015 north of Sand Hill. The building is thought to have been two storeys high with a hypocaust on the ground floor. Animal remains were found extensively across the site. It is thought the site dated from the third to fourth century AD and would have been situated along Dere Street. The site was covered as part of the construction of the Bedale, Aiskew and Leeming Bar bypass, which opened on 11 August 2016 as part of the upgrade to the A1(M).

The village was known as Echescol in Domesday Book in the Hundred of Count Alan of Brittany, the previous Lord having been Gospatric. The village had 7 ploughlands. The Lordship of the Manor followed that of neighbouring Bedale. The name is derived from Old Norse words eik (oak) and skógr (wood) and thus means Oak wood. Robert Hird, Bedale poet and diarist, noted that in late 18th Century the village name was spelled Ascough – he credits "Mr. Edward Strangeways, near Fencote" with the introduction of the modern spelling "by writing it Aiskew on his cartboard".

In 2013 Masons Gin established its first distillery in the village. This was damaged by fire in April 2019, leading to the opening of a new distillery in Leeming Bar in March 2020.

== Governance ==
From 1974 to 2023 it was part of the Hambleton District, it is now administered by the unitary North Yorkshire Council.

Aiskew Civil Parish (as it was before being renamed on 17 April 2018) includes the village of Leeming Bar.

Until 2023, it was part of the Richmond (Yorks) parliamentary constituency. It was removed and added to the expanded Thirsk and Malton Constituency, in part due to areas from that constituency being created into a new seat of Wetherby and Easingwold.

== Demography ==
According to the 2001 UK Census, the population was 2,163 living in 863 dwellings. The 2011 UK Census showed this had increased to 2,427 in 985 dwellings.

Historical population

Year	Pop.	±%
1881	831	—
1891	847	+1.9%
1901	833	−1.7%
1911	880	+5.6%
1921	821	−6.7%

Year	Pop.	±%
1931	789	−3.9%
1941	n/a	—
1951	860	—
1961	881	+2.4%

Source: GB Historical GIS / University of Portsmouth

== Community ==
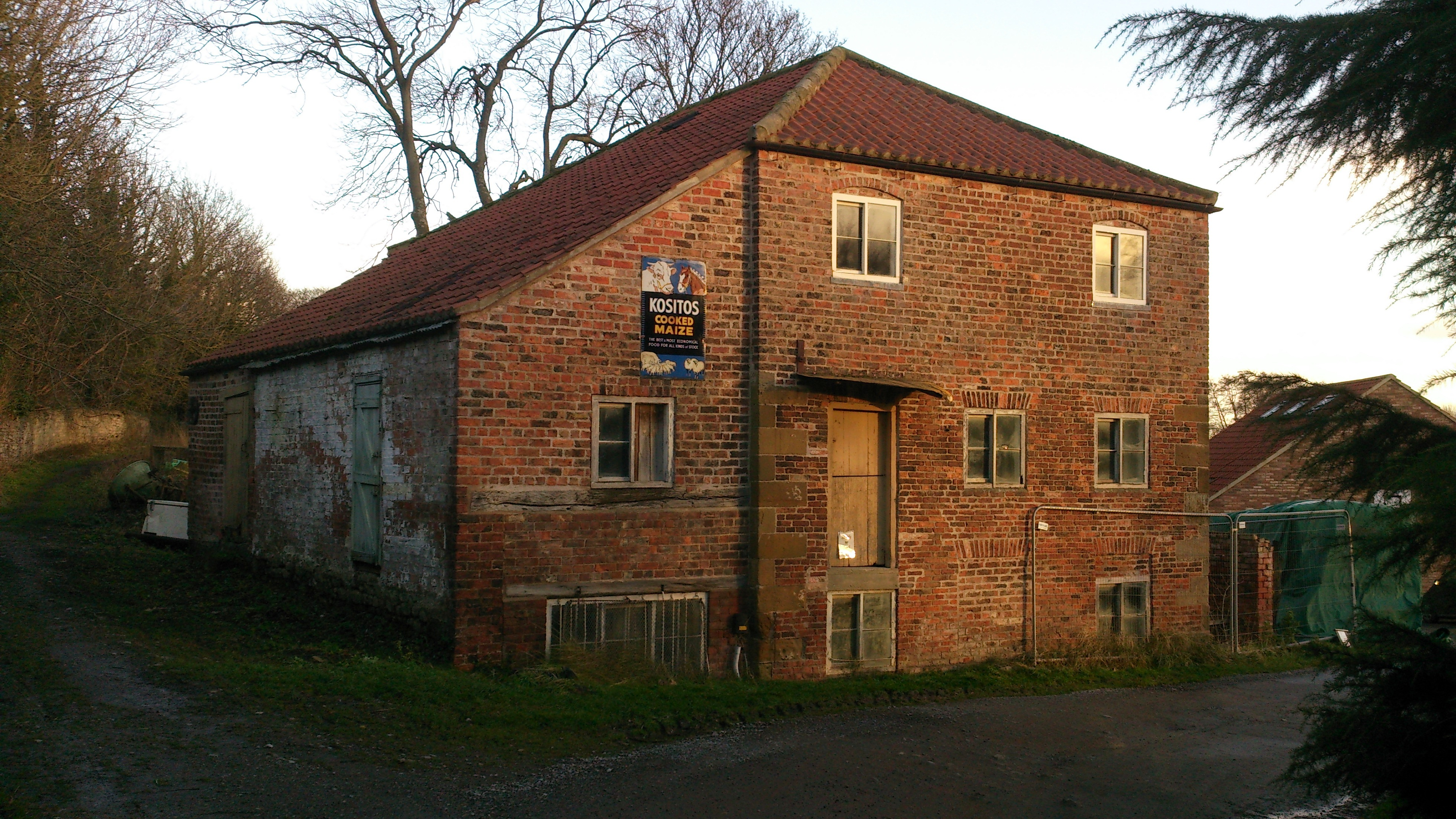
Aiskew Mill

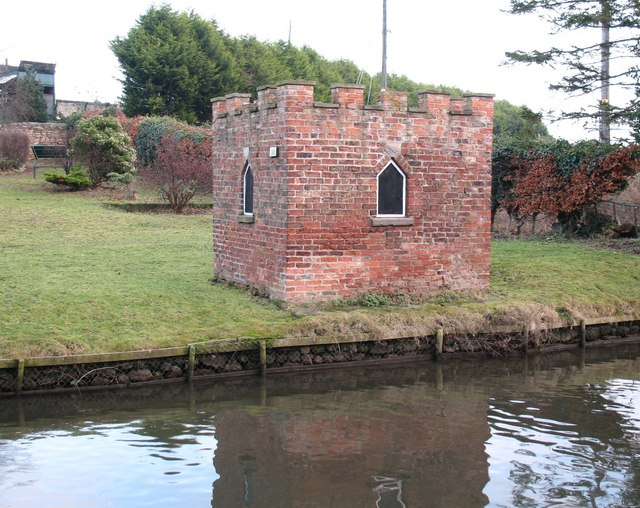
The Leech House

The village is in the Primary Education Catchment Area of Bedale Church of England Primary School, though it is also close to Aiskew, Leeming Bar Church of England Primary School, in Leeming Bar. It is within the Secondary Education Catchment Area of Bedale High School.

The Wensleydale Railway, a tourist and heritage line, includes Bedale station on the Aiskew side of Bedale Beck at the edge of the village. The signal box opposite Park House is a Grade II listed building.

In the village is the 18th-century Grade II listed Aiskew Mill with all its original wooden machinery. There is also an 18th-century Leech House next to the beck.

== Religion ==
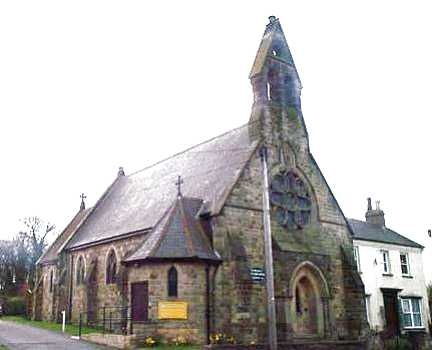
St Mary & St Joseph Church

St Mary and St Joseph's Church, Bedale lies in the village. It was built in 1878, designed by Mr George Goldie of London, after the original chapel became too small for the congregation.

There had been both a Baptist church and Primitive Methodist Chapel in the village.

The Methodist Church in Aiskew, which was part of the Ripon & Lower Dales Methodist Circuit, has closed and the congregation merged with the Bedale & District Methodist Church.

== See also ==
- Listed buildings in Aiskew and Leeming Bar
