= 2011 Hambleton District Council election =

2011 UK local government election

Results of the 2011 Hambleton District Council election

The 2011 Hambleton District Council election was held on Thursday 5 May 2011 to elect all 44 members to Hambleton District Council to a four-year term, the same day as other local elections in the United Kingdom. It was preceded by the 2007 Hambleton District Council election and followed by the 2015 Hambleton District Council election. The Conservative Party held control of the council after the election. The turnout across the council was 46.3%.

== Results summary ==
2011 Hambleton District Council election
Party	Seats	Net gain/loss	Seats %	Votes %	Votes	+/−
Conservative	39	Steady	88.6			
Independent	3	Steady	6.8			
Liberal Democrats	2	Steady	4.5			
Labour	0	Steady	0.0			

== Ward results ==
=== Bedale ===
Bedale (2 seats)
Party	Candidate	Votes	%	±%
Conservative	John Noone	1,416		
Conservative	Carl Les*	1,012		
Labour	Alan Benn	384		
Turnout			43.2	
Registered electors		3,761		
Conservative hold				
Conservative hold				

=== Brompton ===
Brompton (1 seat)
Party	Candidate	Votes	%	±%
Conservative	Isobel Sanderson	392	55.4	▼11.1
Independent	Reg Collins	170	24.0	New
Labour	Janet Kirk	146	20.6	▼12.9
Majority		222	31.4	▼1.5
Total valid votes		708	42.0	
Turnout			42.5	
Registered electors		1,686		
Conservative hold		Swing	▼17.5	

=== Broughton and Greenhow ===
Broughton and Greenhow (1 seat)
Party	Candidate	Votes	%	±%
Conservative	Margaret Skilbeck*	498	65.6	▼8.3
Liberal Democrats	Nicholas Land	161	21.2	▲3.6
Labour	Paul Spellman	100	13.2	▲4.7
Majority		337	44.4	▼11.9
Total valid votes		759	54.2	
Turnout			54.8	
Registered electors		1,400		
Conservative hold		Swing	▼6.0	

=== Cowtons ===
Cowtons (1 seat)
Party	Candidate	Votes	%	±%
Conservative	Steve Watson (Note: Steve Watson was the unsuccessful independent candidate for the Cowtons ward in 2007.)	Unopposed		
Registered electors		1,531		
Conservative hold				

=== Crakehall ===
Crakehall (1 seat)
Party	Candidate	Votes	%	±%
Independent	David Smith*	307	38.0	▼62.0
Conservative	Nigel Parkin	216	26.8	New
Independent	Christine Wheatley	145	18.0	New
Independent	Betty Silver	110	13.6	New
Labour	Alan Richardson	29	3.6	New
Majority		91	11.3	N/A
Total valid votes		807	57.2	
Turnout			57.9	
Registered electors		1,410		
Independent hold		Swing		

=== Easingwold ===
Easingwold (2 seats)
Party	Candidate	Votes	%	±%
Conservative	Shirley Shepherd*	888		
Conservative	Geoff Ellis*	878		
Labour	Kathleen Mullen	458		
Liberal Democrats	Stella Wilson	372		
Turnout			42.4	
Registered electors		3,815		
Conservative hold				
Conservative hold				

=== Great Ayton ===
Great Ayton (3 seats)
Party	Candidate	Votes	%	±%
Conservative	Ron Kirk*	1,340		
Conservative	Richard Hudson	1,185		
Conservative	Frances Greenwell*	1,169		
Liberal Democrats	Richard Short	560		
Labour	Mike Newton	541		
Turnout			49.8	
Registered electors		4,147		
Conservative hold				
Conservative hold				
Conservative hold				

=== Helperby ===
Helperby (1 seat)
Party	Candidate	Votes	%	±%
Conservative	Peter Sowray*	Unopposed		
Registered electors		1,527		
Conservative hold				

=== Huby and Sutton ===
Huby and Sutton (1 seat)
Party	Candidate	Votes	%	±%
Independent	Mike Rigby*	485	57.9	▲7.1
Conservative	Peter Gibson	288	34.4	▼3.5
Labour	Rosemary Shaw	113	13.5	New
Majority		197	23.5	▲10.5
Total valid votes		838	53.4	
Turnout			53.4	
Registered electors		1,570		
Independent hold		Swing	▲5.3	

=== Leeming ===
Leeming (1 seat)
Party	Candidate	Votes	%	±%
Conservative	Arthur Barker*	489	71.3	▼28.7
Liberal Democrats	Roger Fisken	113	16.5	New
Labour	Jane Richardson	84	12.2	New
Majority		376	54.8	N/A
Total valid votes		686	35.2	
Turnout			35.6	
Registered electors		1,947		
Conservative hold		Swing	▼22.6	

=== Leeming Bar ===
Leeming Bar (1 seat)
Party	Candidate	Votes	%	±%
Conservative	Anthony Wood	620	83.1	▼16.9
Labour	Alex Cornwall	126	16.9	New
Majority		494	66.2	N/A
Total valid votes		746	47.2	
Turnout			48.3	
Registered electors		1,582		
Conservative hold		Swing	▼16.9	

=== Morton-on-Swale ===
Morton-on-Swale (1 seat)
Party	Candidate	Votes	%	±%
Conservative	Brian Phillips*	605	76.2	▼23.8
Labour	Roy Hutchings	189	23.8	New
Majority		416	52.4	N/A
Total valid votes		794	55.1	
Turnout			56.0	
Registered electors		1,442		
Conservative hold		Swing	▼23.8	

=== Northallerton Broomfield ===
Northallerton Broomfield (2 seats)
Party	Candidate	Votes	%	±%
Conservative	Peter Wilkinson	1,009		
Conservative	David Blades*	996		
Labour	Peter Cornwall	468		
Turnout			45.6	
Registered electors		3,651		
Conservative hold				
Conservative hold				

=== Northallerton Central ===
Northallerton Central (2 seats)
Party	Candidate	Votes	%	±%
Independent	John Coulson*	625		
Conservative	Tony Hall*	462		
Conservative	Catherine Baker	310		
Labour	Gerry Ramsden	25		
Turnout			31.9	
Registered electors		3,431		
Independent hold				
Conservative hold				

=== Northallerton North ===
Northallerton North (2 seats)
Party	Candidate	Votes	%	±%
Conservative	John Prest*	695		
Conservative	Ken Billings	571		
Labour	Sally Anderson	338		
Turnout			36.3	
Registered electors		2,962		
Conservative hold				
Conservative hold				

=== Osmotherley ===
Osmotherley (1 seat)
Party	Candidate	Votes	%	±%
Conservative	Tim Swales*	Unopposed		
Registered electors		1,477		
Conservative hold				

=== Romanby ===
Romanby (2 seats)
Party	Candidate	Votes	%	±%
Conservative	John Smith*	880		
Conservative	Kevin Hardisty	871		
Labour	Ann Hutchings	499		
Turnout			46.1	
Registered electors		3,273		
Conservative hold				
Conservative hold				

=== Rudby ===
Rudby (2 seats)
Party	Candidate	Votes	%	±%
Conservative	Bridget Fortune*	1,189		
Conservative	Stephen Dickins*	1,054		
Labour	Jeff King	329		
Turnout			53.6	
Registered electors		2,985		
Conservative hold				
Conservative hold				

=== Shipton ===
Shipton (1 seat)
Party	Candidate	Votes	%	±%
Conservative	Chris Rooke	Unopposed		
Registered electors		1,872		
Conservative hold				

=== Sowerby ===
Sowerby (2 seats)
Party	Candidate	Votes	%	±%
Conservative	Mark Robson*	735		
Conservative	Peter Bardon	627		
Independent	David Bentley	388		
Labour	Michael Graham	341		
Liberal Democrats	Stanley Wilson	183		
Turnout			41.4	
Registered electors		3,324		
Conservative hold				
Conservative hold				

=== Stillington ===
Stillington (1 seat)
Party	Candidate	Votes	%	±%
Conservative	Christine Cookman*	Unopposed		
Registered electors		1,589		
Conservative hold				

=== Stokesley ===
Stokesley (3 seats)
Party	Candidate	Votes	%	±%
Liberal Democrats	Jackie Griffiths*	1,152		
Liberal Democrats	Bryn Griffiths*	1,081		
Conservative	Andy Wake	1,076		
Conservative	Heather Moorhouse	941		
Conservative	Andrew Dickins	912		
Labour	Eileen Driver	808		
Turnout			51.1	
Registered electors		4,519		
Liberal Democrats hold				
Liberal Democrats hold				
Conservative hold				

=== Swainby ===
Swainby (1 seat)
Party	Candidate	Votes	%	±%
Conservative	David Hugill	629	75.6	▲2.5
Liberal Democrats	Roger Hole	203	24.4	▼2.5
Majority		426	51.2	▲5.0
Total valid votes		832	53.1	
Turnout			54.6	
Registered electors		1,567		
Conservative hold		Swing	▲2.5	

=== Tanfield ===
Tanfield (1 seat)
Party	Candidate	Votes	%	±%
Conservative	David Webster*	586	81.6	▼18.4
Labour	Annie Mannix	132	18.4	New
Majority		454	63.2	N/A
Total valid votes		718	48.8	
Turnout			49.6	
Registered electors		1,471		
Conservative hold		Swing	▼18.4	

=== Thirsk ===
Thirsk (3 seats)
Party	Candidate	Votes	%	±%
Conservative	Gareth Dadd*	1,236		
Conservative	Derek Adamson*	900		
Conservative	Andy Robinson*	832		
Liberal Democrats	Eileen Adamson	425		
Turnout			34.8	
Registered electors		4,755		
Conservative hold				
Conservative hold				
Conservative hold				

=== Thorntons ===
Thorntons (1 seat)
Party	Candidate	Votes	%	±%
Conservative	Bob Baker*	Unopposed		
Registered electors		1,523		
Conservative hold				

=== Tollerton ===
Tollerton (1 seat)
Party	Candidate	Votes	%	±%
Conservative	Nigel Knapton	Unopposed		
Registered electors		1,663		
Conservative hold				

=== Topcliffe ===
Topcliffe (1 seat)
Party	Candidate	Votes	%	±%
Conservative	Neville Huxtable*	550	74.8	▼25.2
Liberal Democrats	Robert Adamson	185	25.2	New
Majority		365	49.7	N/A
Total valid votes		735	43.0	
Turnout			44.1	
Registered electors		1,709		
Conservative hold		Swing	▼25.2	

=== White Horse ===
White Horse (1 seat)
Party	Candidate	Votes	%	±%
Conservative	Caroline Patmore	Unopposed		
Registered electors		1,701		
Conservative hold				

=== Whitestonecliffe ===
Whitestonecliffe (1 seat)
Party	Candidate	Votes	%	±%
Conservative	Nigel Clack	Unopposed		
Registered electors		1,597		
Conservative hold				
