= Leeming Bar =

Village in North Yorkshire, England

Coordinates: 54.30504°N 1.55998°W

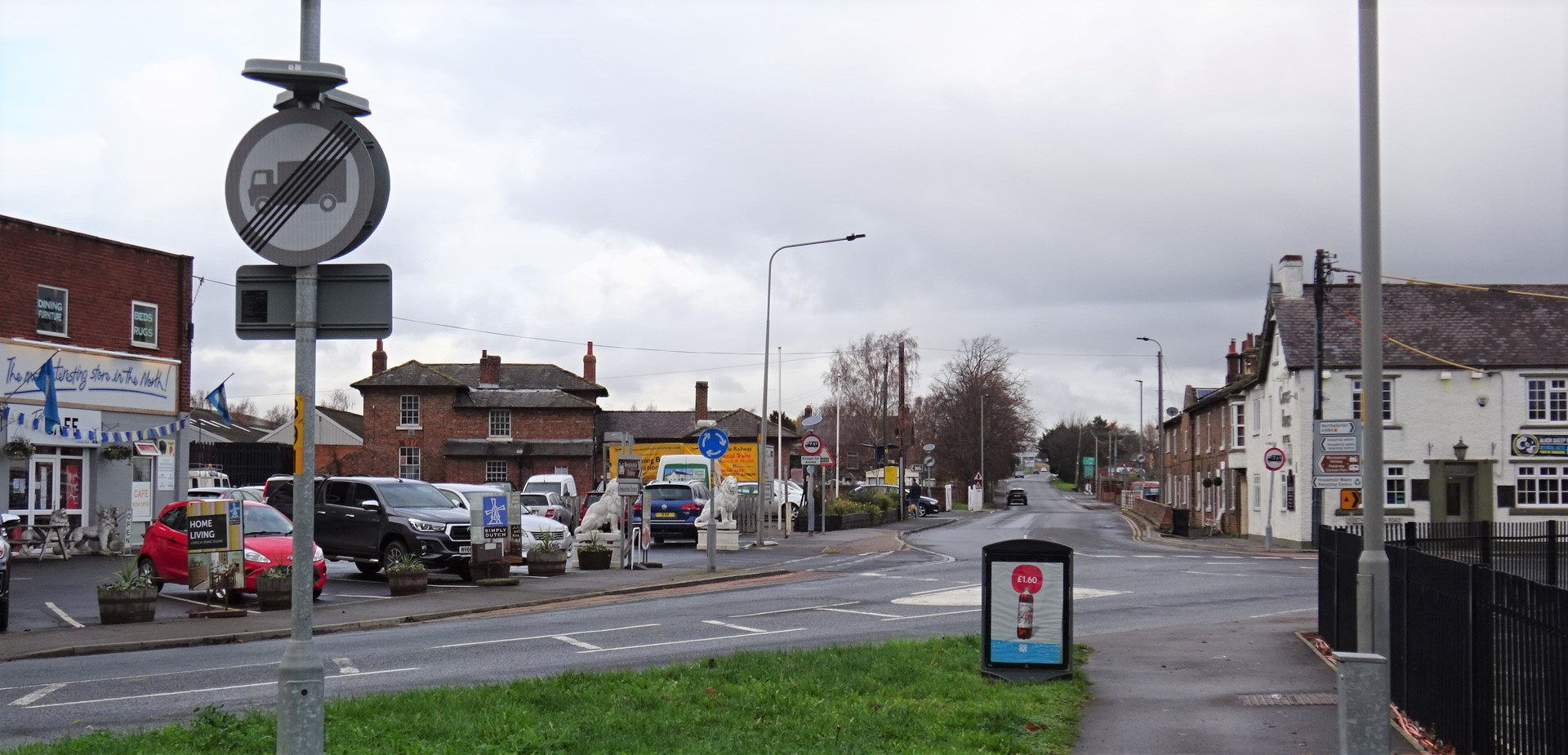
- Leeming Bar

- Location within North Yorkshire
- OS grid reference: SE287900
- Civil parish: Aiskew and Leeming Bar
- Unitary authority: North Yorkshire
- Ceremonial county: North Yorkshire
- Region: Yorkshire and the Humber
- Country: England
- Sovereign state: United Kingdom
- Post town: NORTHALLERTON
- Postcode district: DL7
- Police: North Yorkshire
- Fire: North Yorkshire
- Ambulance: Yorkshire
- UK Parliament: Thirsk and Malton

Leeming Bar is a village in the civil parish of Aiskew and Leeming Bar, in North Yorkshire, England. The village is situated on the original Great North Road (Dere Street) before being bypassed. It is now home to a large industrial estate and the main operating site of the Wensleydale Railway.

== Governance ==
Historically Leeming Bar was a hamlet in the wapentake of Hallikeld and a township in the ecclesiastical parish of Gatenby, part of the historic North Riding of Yorkshire An electoral ward in the same name exists. This ward stretches north to Kirkby Fleetham with a total population of approximately 1800 (as of 2005) and of 1,966 at the 2011 census. From 1974 to 2023 it was part of the Hambleton District, it is now administered by the unitary North Yorkshire Council.

Leeming Bar was part of the Richmond (Yorks) parliamentary constituency until 2023. It was removed and added to the expanded Thirsk and Malton Constituency, in part due to areas from that constituency being created into a new seat of Wetherby and Easingwold.

== Geography ==
Leeming Bar's name is derived from the fact that it housed a Toll-House with a barrier that travellers were expected to pay at for onward travel beyond the barrier. Around 1840, the barrier was moved further south towards Leeming village, as a quirk in the local bye-laws meant that people did not have to pay for travelling within 150 yards (140 m) of the crossroads on either Dere Street or the Bedale to Northallerton road. The original Great North Road through Leeming Bar is known as Leeming Lane, a name it retains all the way between Boroughbridge and Catterick. The Roman Road through Leeming Bar took a slightly different route than today's Leeming Lane, as it took a straight line from the church in Leeming village, crossing Bedale Beck at point just west of Leeming Bridge, and headed in a straight line to the current crossroads in the village of Leeming Bar. The s-curve that Leeming Lane takes over Bedale Beck is thought to have been done to improvements made to the road when it was turnpiked in the 1740s.

Located just to east of the A1(M) motorway and near RAF Leeming, it is home to the main depot of the Wensleydale Railway at Leeming Bar railway station as well as the Dales & District bus company. It was first bypassed in 1961, again in 2012, and lies on the Roman road Dere Street. It is approximately 0.93 miles (1.5 km) along the old A684 from the village of Aiskew and 7 miles (11 km) along the same road from the town of Northallerton. The A684 bypass was opened up in August 2016.

== Amenities ==
It used to have a C of E church, St Augustine's, which was last used for religious services in 2010. The tied C of E primary School has an enrolment of 50 pupils. In 2023, Ofsted rated the school as Good, whereas it had been labelled as requires improvement since 2017. There are three pubs, two of which, the Reubens Inn on Bedale Road, and the Corner House are also hotels. A new Co-op store was opened up at the junction of Roman Road and Bedale Road in the village in July 2017.

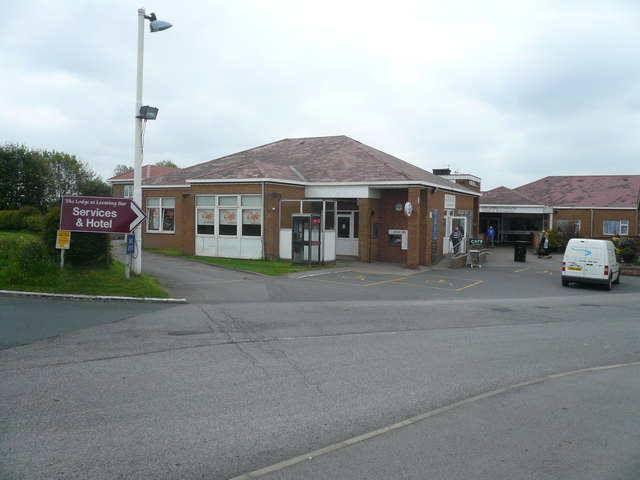
Services on the A6055 road at Leeming Bar

The Leeming Bar service station was set up at the junction of the old A1 road and the A684 road on the western edge of the village in 1961. In 2012, it won an appeal to become an official motorway service station and was sold to Moto in 2014. The Services now lie on the adjacent A6055 local access road that has a junction with the A1(M) just to the north of Leeming Bar (junction 51).

A second service station with access to the A684 and the A1(M) at junction 51 was opened at Coneygarth in December 2014. The Coneygarth Truck Stop is run by Exelby Services who closed down their refuelling point in nearby Londonderry to run the new service station. The site is just to the north of Leeming Bar village. However, both Coneygarth and Leeming Bar services are not officially designated as Motorway Service Areas (MSAs) by the government, which has allowed other newer service areas to be developed elsewhere along the A1(M) corridor in North Yorkshire.

== Industry ==
An industrial agricultural business trades alongside the main road in Leeming Bar. John H Gill & Son have been in the village since 1937 when they bought out the foundry of F Mattison & Co. Run by William Mattison, the company made much agricultural machinery at their foundry which was built on railway land at Leeming Bar. However, the company was known mostly for its cast-iron mileposts, of which about 100 survive across North Yorkshire.

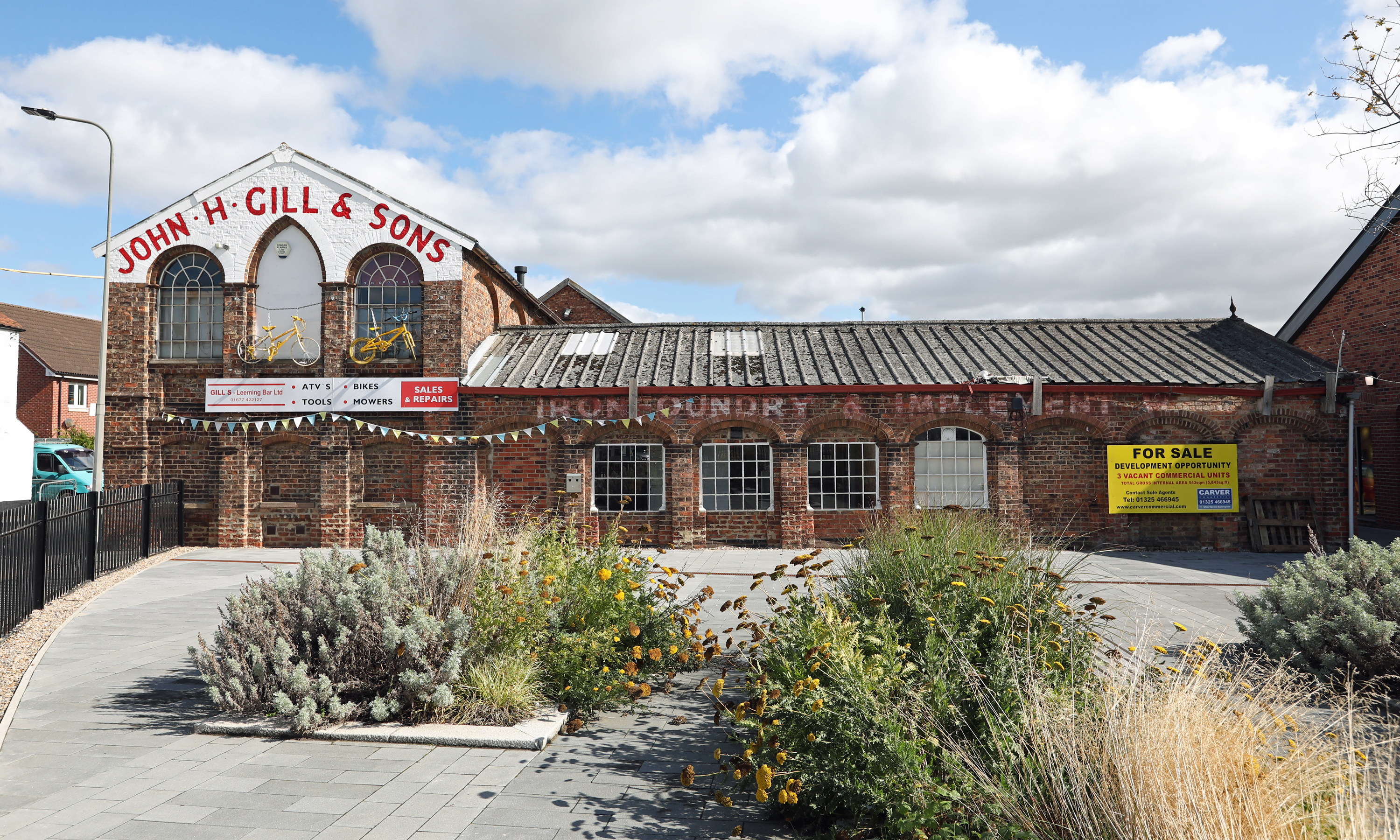
The John Gill works

Leeming Bar is host to an industrial estate that houses, among other things, the headquarters of Froneri, who make Fab and Rowntree's Fruit Pastilles ice lollies. Cawingredients also have a soft drink manufacturing plant on the industrial estate covering over 10,400 square metres (112,000 sq ft). A household waste recycling site is also on the industrial estate.

The Vale of Mowbray food factory was also in the village. The factory had suffered two fires in the 21st century; in 2002 a major fire caused an industrial oven to explode and led to the company being prosecuted by the Health and Safety Executive. In 2017, another fire led to 10,000 smoke damaged pork pies being destroyed by the company. The factory was closed down in September 2022.

== See also ==
- Listed buildings in Aiskew and Leeming Bar
