= Masons Gin =

Company based in North Yorkshire, England

Coordinates: 54.2942°N 1.5755°W

Masons Of Yorkshire
- Type: Gin
- Manufacturer: Masons Of Yorkshire
- Distributor: Masons Of Yorkshire
- Origin: North Yorkshire, United Kingdom
- Introduced: 2013
- Alcohol by volume: 42%
- Colour: Clear
- Ingredients: Almond oil, bay, cardamom, coriander, fennel, juniper, lemon peel, lime peel, orange peel, Sichuan pepper
- Variants: See list
- Website: Official website

Masons Gin (also known as Masons Of Yorkshire) is a gin based alcoholic drink distilled by the Mason family in North Yorkshire, England. It had a distillery and shop in Aiskew, North Yorkshire, which was moved to a new site in Leeming Bar, after a fire.

== History ==
Karl and Cathy Mason created the brand in 2012 and launched their first gin a year later on World Gin Day, 13 June 2013. Originally the business was located in Bedale Hall for the offices with the stills situated in Cambridge. The business expanded and moved into one site at Aiskew which was formerly a mechanics workshop. Known as Yorkshire Dry Gin, the gin is distilled in a traditional dry gin method using a copper alembic still, with all the botanicals (herbs, fruit and spices) present in the still. This process is known as the London Dry Gin method. The company also uses Harrogate Spring Water in its gins.

Initially they started out with 120 bottles from the first still in 2013. In 2018, the company produced over 250,000 bottles of gin and vodka from its Aiskew distillery and recorded a £3 million turnover.

On 2 April 2019, one of the gin stills exploded and caused a fire in the distillery. Whilst everyone was evacuated safely and no injuries were reported, the fire caused extensive damage to the distillery. Whilst the directors of the company secured office space in Bedale Hall, their gin products have been bottled at a "food-grade premises" nearby. They confirmed that they were looking for a brand new location rather than returning to the old distillery at Aiskew. A new distillery has been installed at a location on the Leeming Bar industrial estate, and opened on 6 March 2020.

Shortly after moving into their new premises, the COVID-19 pandemic curtailed their operations. However, they, like many other alcohol-based producers, turned to manufacturing hand sanitiser which they donated to RAF Leeming and businesses in their home town of Bedale.

== Products ==
=== Gins ===
- The Original Gin
- English Lavender Gin
- Tea Edition Gin - a gin flavoured with Yorkshire Tea, also known as a G and Tea
- Pear & Pink Peppercorn Gin
- Orange & Lime Leaf Gin
- G12 - only available through one supermarket (so called because it has 12 botanicals in it)
- G12 - Grapefruit & mandarin
- Smouldering Heights - a smoky gin infused with beech-smoked and peat-smoked malt, heather and Sichuan pepper. The gin was largely conceived after the distillery was subject to a fire.
- Phoenix Gin - a limited edition with money from each sale going to the Fire Fighters charity, as a thank you for putting out the fire at their old distillery.

=== Discontinued products ===
- Apple gin - created as a special edition for the 160th anniversary of The Great Yorkshire Show in 2018. The gin was flavoured with apple blossoms from the Great Yorkshire Showground.
- Barrel Blended gin - a venture using barrels from the nearby Theakston Brewery.
- Yorkshire Vodka
- Slow Distilled Sloe Gin - this gin actually distills the sloe berries, as opposed to the traditional method of infusing them in gin
- Steve's Apple Gin - distilled with apples picked from an orchard in Thornton Watlass

== Awards ==
At the 2017 San Francisco World Spirits Competition, Masons were awarded gold for the Original Dry Yorkshire Gin and their Yorkshire Vodka. The Lavender gin won silver and their Tea gin won a bronze award.

By 2018, Masons had won over 50 international awards for their gins, their original blend was voted the best contemporary gin in 2017. The Original and Lavender gins won gold at the World Gin awards in 2018.

In 2019 Masons received several awards at the San Francisco World Spirits Competition. The Lavender Gin won gold, the Original Gin won silver and their Peppered Pear and G12 Botanically Rich Dry Gin took the bronze awards.

At the International Wine and Spirit Competition in 2019, Masons Yorkshire Gin Tea Edition won the Gold Award, one of eight such awards given out to gins from across the world.
