= St Mary and St Joseph's Church, Bedale =

Catholic church in North Yorkshire, England

Coordinates: 54°17′28″N 1°35′10″W

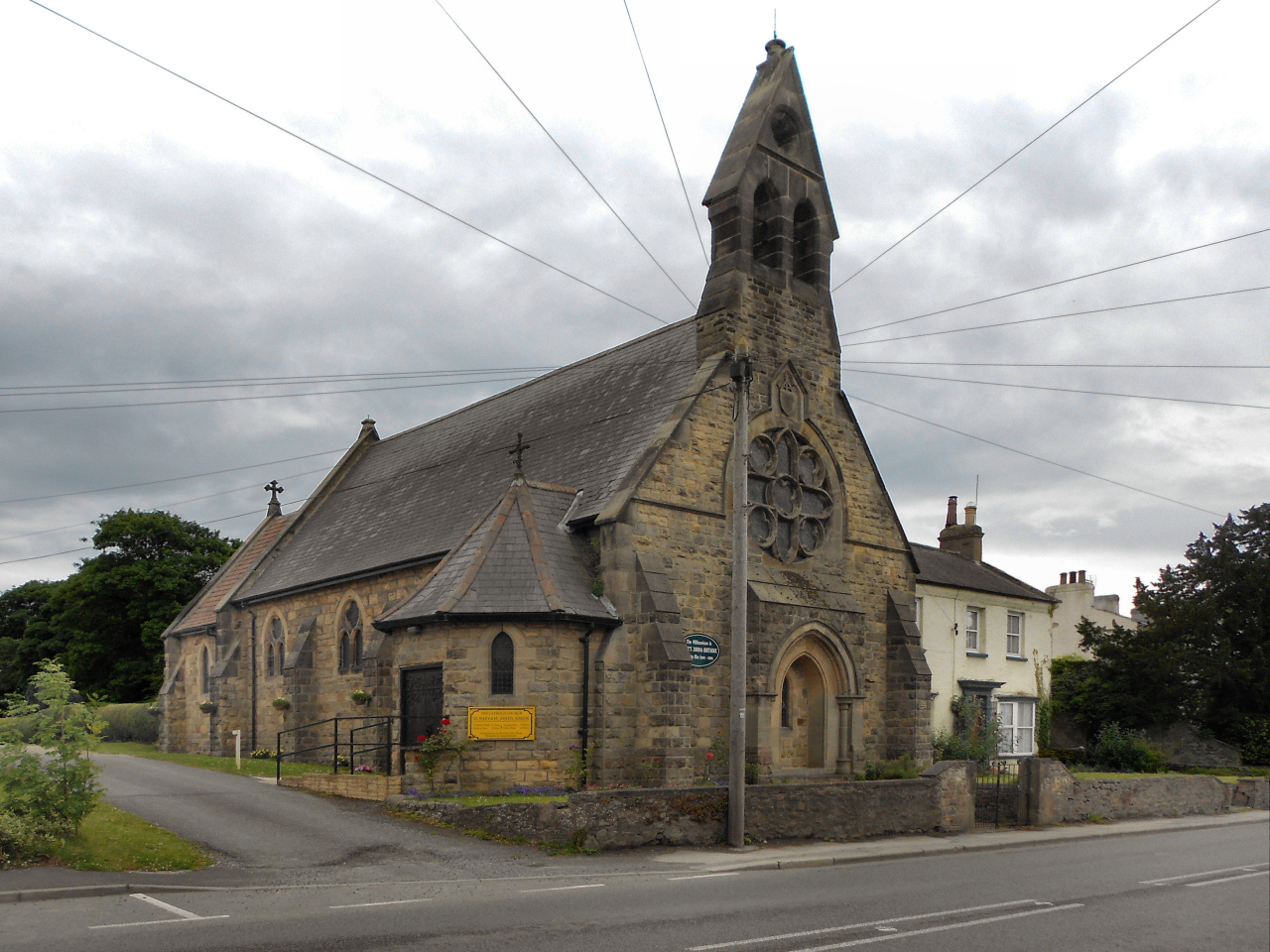
The church, in 2011

St Mary and St Joseph's Church is a Catholic parish church in Aiskew, a village near Bedale in North Yorkshire, in England.

Catholic worship took place at Aiskew Grange from at least 1771, and a church was built in 1812. The current church was funded by the Scrope family, designed by George Goldie, and completed in 1878.

The church is built of local stone, the nave roof is covered with slate, and the sanctuary roof with red concrete tiles. It consists of a three-bay nave, a small sanctuary, and a small projection to the north-west of the nave which may originally have been a baptistery, but is now a porch. The west end originally housed the main entrance, but this has been blocked. Above is a large rose window. The east window has four lights and tracery, with stained glass memorialising Hugh Smith Dodsworth.
