= Aiskew Mill =

Mill in Aiskew, North Yorkshire, England

Coordinates: 54°17′18″N 1°35′09″W

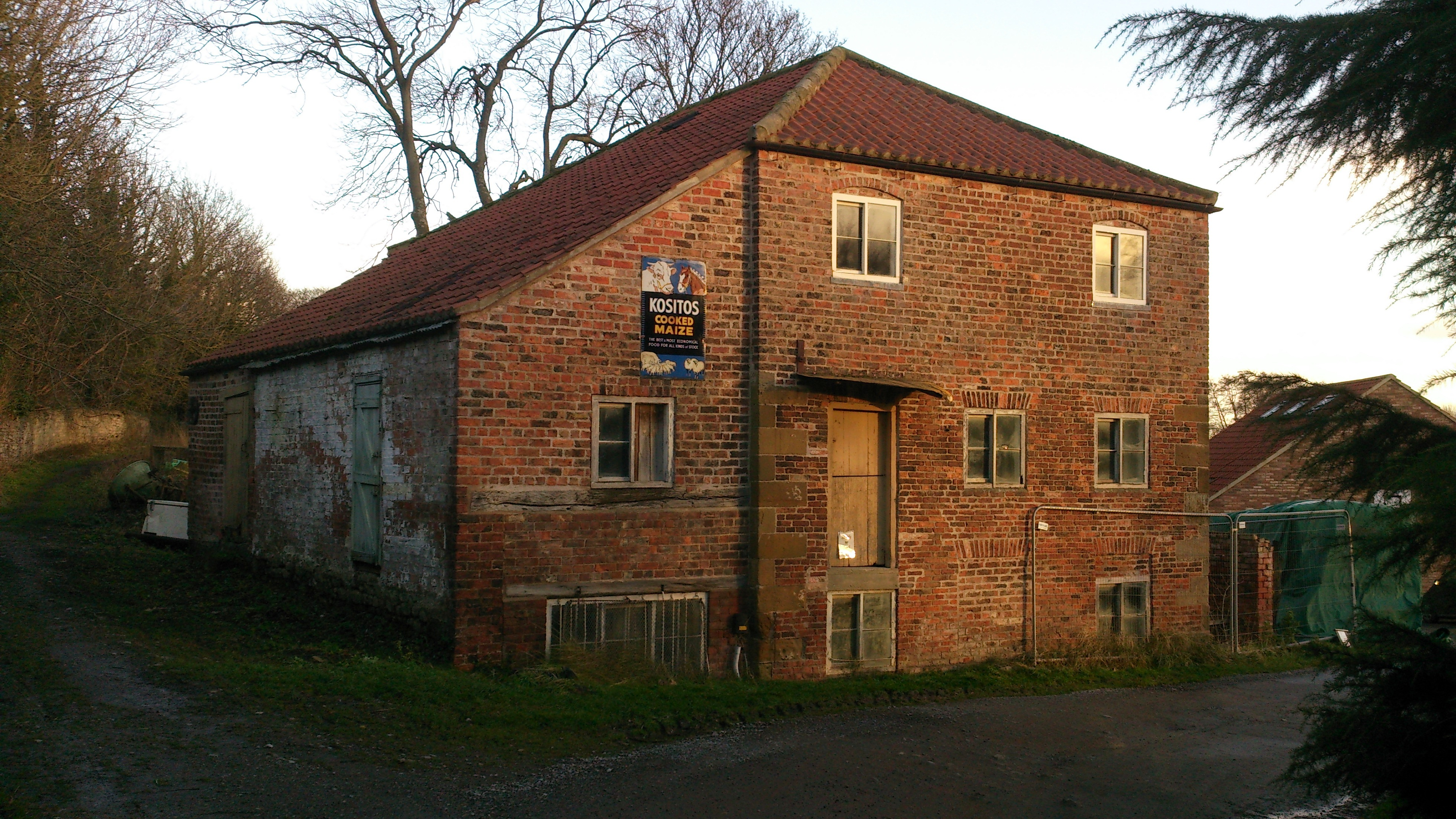
The mill, in 2013

Aiskew Mill is a historic building in Aiskew, a village in North Yorkshire, in England.

The corn mill was built in the late 18th century on the Bedale Beck, powered by an undershot waterwheel. In the mid 19th century, a three-storey extension was added. The last miller converted the building to produce electric power. However, all the original machinery survives, along with two millstones.

In 1981, the building was Grade II* listed, and it was sold to David and Carol Clark, who gradually restored it, with the intention of opening it as a working museum. In 2001, they proposed to fund the remainder of the restoration by building housing on neighbouring land, but this was rejected by a planning inspector. In 2010, the mill reopened as a community bakery.

The three-storey brick building has stone quoins. The ground floor is slightly below ground level. There are many original sash windows, and a boarded stable door.

== See also ==
- Listed buildings in Aiskew and Leeming Bar
