= 2019 Hambleton District Council election =

2019 UK local government election

Map of the results

The 2019 Hambleton District Council election took place on 2 May 2019 to elect members of the Hambleton District Council in England. It was held on the same day as other local elections.

== Results summary ==
2019 Hambleton District Council election
Party	Seats	Gains	Losses	Net gain/loss	Seats %	Votes %	Votes	+/−
Conservative	24	0	3	▼3	85.7	59.8	23,630	
Independent	2	2	0	▲2	7.1	6.8	2,675	
Labour	1	1	0	▲1	3.6	17.5	6,908	
Liberal Democrats	1	1	0	▲1	3.6	8.5	3,349	
Green	0	0	0	0	0.0	7.5	2,978	
UKIP	0	0	1	▼1	0.0	0.0	0	

== Ward results ==
=== Appleton Wiske & Smeatons ===
Appleton Wiske & Smeatons
Party	Candidate	Votes	%	±%
Conservative	Stephen Watson	595	65.8	−7.5
Green	Fione Yorke	246	27.2	+12.5
Labour Co-op	Jane Richardson	63	7.0	−5.0
Majority				
Turnout		925	37.5	
Conservative hold		Swing		

=== Bagby & Thorntons ===
Bagby & Thorntons
Party	Candidate	Votes	%	±%
Independent	Andrew Robinson	573	52.8	
Conservative	Robert Baker	513	47.2	+47.2
Majority				
Turnout		1,114	39.9	
Independent gain from Conservative		Swing		

=== Bedale ===
Bedale
Party	Candidate	Votes	%	±%
Conservative	John Noone	1,168	58.2	
Conservative	Michael Barningham	1,147	57.1	
Conservative	Carl Les	1,032	51.4	
Green	Michael Chaloner	670	33.4	
Green	Patricia Fairey	617	30.7	
Green	Matthew Sawyer	548	27.3	
Labour	Charmian Walter	246	12.3	
Turnout		2,043	28.6	
Conservative hold				
Conservative hold				
Conservative hold				

=== Easingwold ===
Easingwold
Party	Candidate	Votes	%	±%
Conservative	Nigel Knapton	1,463	53.8	
Conservative	Malcolm Taylor	1,312	48.3	
Conservative	Paula Thompson	1,092	40.2	
Independent	Shirley Shepherd	927	34.1	
Labour	Bryony Hart	734	27.0	
Labour	Nicholas Howarth Pulleyn	689	25.4	
Labour	Deanna Pearce	638	23.5	
Turnout		2,786	34.8	
Conservative hold				
Conservative hold				
Conservative hold				

=== Great Ayton ===
Great Ayton
Party	Candidate	Votes	%	±%
Conservative	Ronald Kirk	909	53.6	
Conservative	Richard Hudson	851	50.1	
Liberal Democrats	Richard Short	537	37.5	
Liberal Democrats	Nicholas Land	472	27.8	
Labour	Glyn Mucklow	352	20.7	
Turnout		1,726	37.4	
Conservative hold				
Conservative hold				

=== Huby ===
Huby
Party	Candidate	Votes	%	±%
Conservative	Di Watkins	Unopposed		
Majority				
Turnout				
Conservative hold				

=== Hutton Rudby ===
Hutton Rudby
Party	Candidate	Votes	%	±%
Conservative	Bridget Fortune	633	59.0	−11.4
Labour	Pauline Reed	259	24.2	−5.4
Liberal Democrats	Nicholas Ryan	180	16.8	
Majority				
Turnout		1,089	41.5	
Conservative hold		Swing		

=== Morton-on-Swale ===
Morton-on-Swale
Party	Candidate	Votes	%	±%
Conservative	Brian Phillips	934	80.3	+1.5
Labour	Trevor Mitchell	229	19.7	−1.5
Majority				
Turnout		1,209	42.5	
Conservative hold		Swing		

=== Northallerton North & Brompton ===
Northallerton North & Brompton
Party	Candidate	Votes	%	±%
Independent	Paul Atkin	702	47.1	
Conservative	Jane Sanderson	504	33.8	
Independent	Joseph Lambert	473	31.7	
Conservative	David Blades	469	31.5	
Labour	Sally Anderson	431	28.9	
Majority				
Turnout		1,498	31.1	
Independent gain from Conservative		Swing		
Conservative hold		Swing		

=== Northallerton South ===
Northallerton South
Party	Candidate	Votes	%	±%
Conservative	Caroline Dickinson	844	67.0	
Labour	Gerald Ramsden	527	41.8	
Conservative	Michael Heasman	526	41.7	
Turnout		1,313	25.4	
Conservative hold				
Labour gain from UKIP				

=== Osmotherley & Swainby ===
Osmotherley & Swainby
Party	Candidate	Votes	%	±%
Conservative	John Hugill	648	64.1	+2.6
Liberal Democrats	Jacqueline Griffiths	163	16.1	
Green	John Yorke	121	12.0	
Labour	Joseph Body	79	7.8	−6.0
Majority				
Turnout		1,027	41.5	
Conservative hold		Swing		

=== Raskelf & White Horse ===
Raskelf & White Horse
Party	Candidate	Votes	%	±%
Conservative	Jillian Mortimer	560	60.7	+60.7
Green	John Law	363	39.3	
Majority				
Turnout		971	36.0	
Conservative hold		Swing		

=== Romanby ===
Romanby
Party	Candidate	Votes	%	±%
Conservative	Kevin Hardisty	1,096	64.1	
Conservative	Peter Wilkinson	1,012	59.2	
Labour	Brian Hazeldine	576	33.7	
Turnout		1,758	35.2	
Conservative hold				
Conservative hold				

=== Sowerby & Topcliffe ===
Sowerby & Topcliffe
Party	Candidate	Votes	%	±%
Conservative	Mark Robson	1,002	61.3	
Conservative	Peter Bardon	993	60.7	
Labour	Rosemary Kett	561	34.3	
Labour	Jerome Wright	519	31.7	
Turnout		1,714	30.9	
Conservative hold				
Conservative hold				

=== Stokesley ===
Stokesley
Party	Candidate	Votes	%	±%
Liberal Democrats	Bryn Griffiths	1,184	56.6	
Conservative	Andrew Wake	927	44.3	
Liberal Democrats	Paul Chapman	813	38.9	
Conservative	Claire Gill	659	31.5	
Labour Co-op	Eileen Driver	341	16.3	
Turnout		2,114	43.1	
Liberal Democrats gain from Conservative				
Conservative hold				

=== Tanfield ===
Tanfield
Party	Candidate	Votes	%	±%
Conservative	David Webster	600	74.2	−3.5
Labour Co-op	Anne Mannix	209	25.8	+3.5
Majority				
Turnout		851	35.1	
Conservative hold		Swing		

=== Thirsk ===
Thirsk
Party	Candidate	Votes	%	±%
Conservative	Gareth Dadd	1,151	69.5	
Conservative	David Elders	990	59.8	
Green	Diane Brown	413	25.0	
Labour	Marcus Missen	236	14.3	
Labour	Philip Smith	219	13.2	
Turnout		1,690	31.3	
Conservative hold				
Conservative hold				

== Changes 2019–2023 ==
- 1 April 2023: Hambleton District Council was abolished and its functions transferred to North Yorkshire Council, the new unitary authority for the county.

=== By-elections ===
==== Raskelf & White Horse ====
Raskelf & White Horse (1 seat), 25 November 2021
Party	Candidate	Votes	%	±%
Conservative	Philippa James	288	55.7	−2.9
Liberal Democrats	Neil Beckwith	127	24.6	N/A
Green	Adam Harper	102	19.7	−21.7
Rejected ballots		4	0.8	
Majority		161	31.1	
Turnout		521	18.7	
Conservative hold		Swing	▼13.8	

The by-election was triggered by the resignation of Conservative councillor Jill Mortimer.
