= Bedale =

Market town and civil parish in North Yorkshire, England

Coordinates: 54°17′17″N 1°35′29″W

- Town
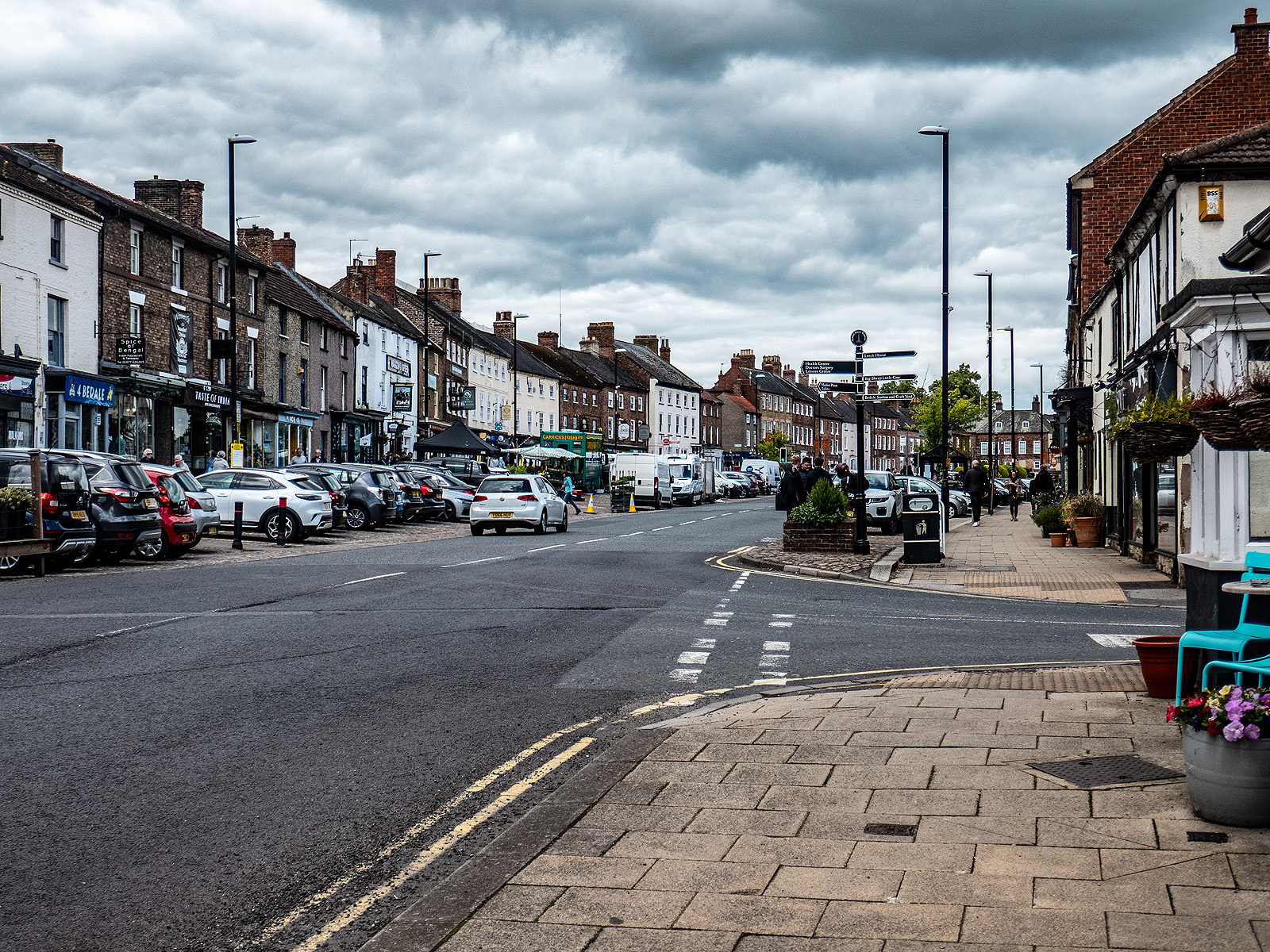
- Market Place

- Location within North Yorkshire
- Population: 3,156 (Including Firby 2011 census)
- OS grid reference: SE266883
  - London: 206 mi (332 km) south
- Civil parish: Bedale
- Unitary authority: North Yorkshire
- Ceremonial county: North Yorkshire
- Region: Yorkshire and the Humber
- Country: England
- Sovereign state: United Kingdom
- Post town: BEDALE
- Postcode district: DL8
- Dialling code: 01677
- Police: North Yorkshire
- Fire: North Yorkshire
- Ambulance: Yorkshire
- UK Parliament: Thirsk and Malton

Bedale (/ˈbiːdeɪl/ BEE-dayl), is a market town and civil parish in North Yorkshire, England. Bedale Beck is a tributary of the River Swale, which forms one of the Yorkshire Dales. The dale has a predominant agriculture sector and its related small traditional trades, although tourism is increasingly important. Northallerton is 7 miles (11 km) north-east, Middlesbrough 26 miles (42 km) north-east and York is 31 miles (50 km) south-south-east.

Historically part of the North Riding of Yorkshire, the town was listed in Domesday Book under what became the honour of Richmond. The honour had several wapentakes and Bedale was part of Hang (named after Hang Bank in Finghall or alternatively named after Catterick) and later Hang East.

== History ==
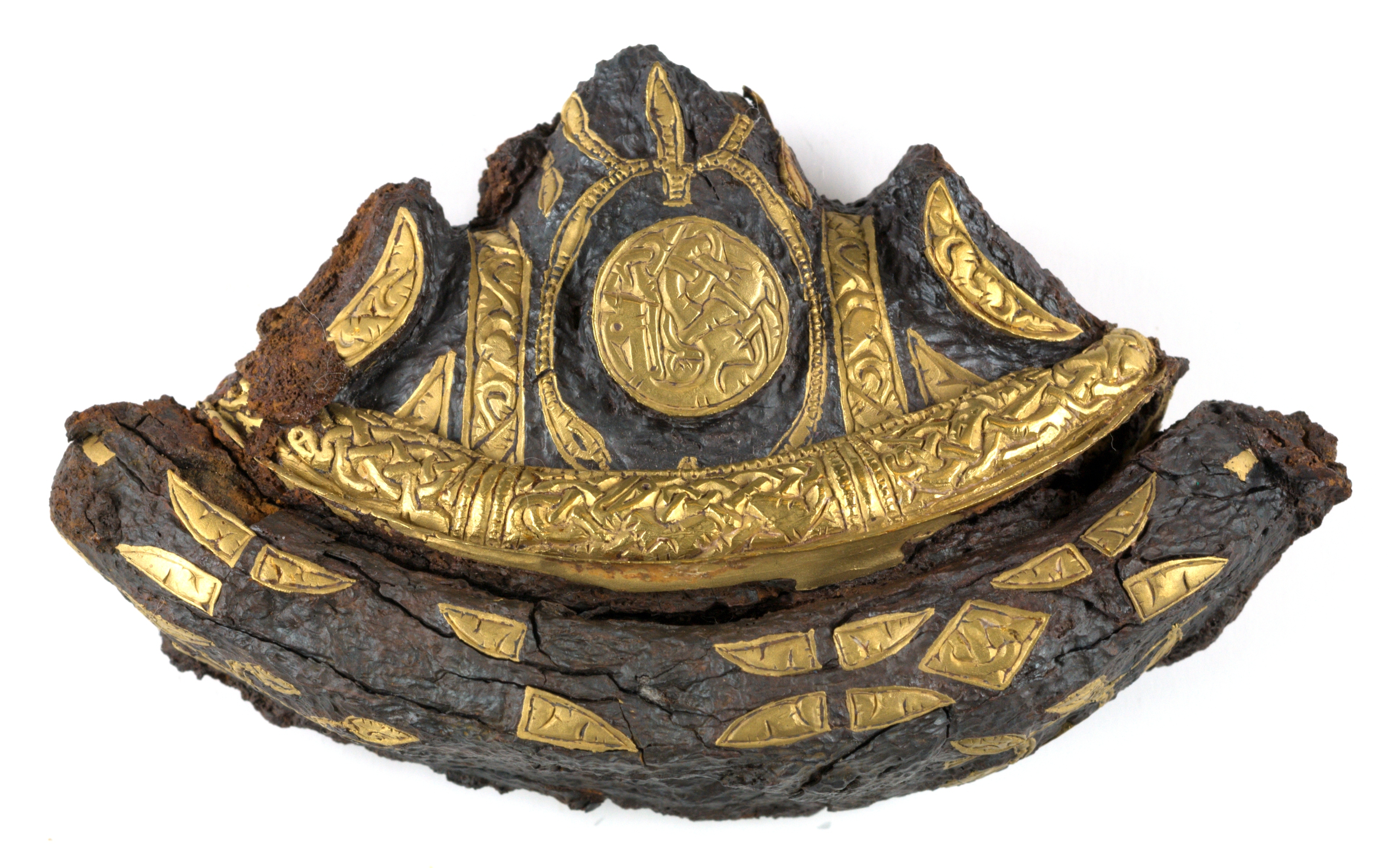
Sword Pommel from the Bedale Hoard

Before the Harrying of the North Bedale was held by Torpin (Thorfinn), a patronym retained by the infamous Dick Turpin. The parish church also dates from this time (as evidenced by its crypt), before significant remodelling. The original 9th-century church escaped destruction in the Harrying of the North and was recorded in Domesday Book. The recent discovery of the Bedale Hoard provides further evidence of high-status Anglo-Saxon and Viking Age activity in the area. The town was recorded as Bedell or Bedhal and derives from 'Beda's Halh', which means the corner or piece of land of Beda.

=== Under the Bretons of Richmond ===
After being doled out by Count Alan Le Roux to his relative Bodin of Middleham for a short time, the new market town was founded by Scollandus (in a charter later confirmed by Henry III), a Breton officer in a hereditary position at Richmond Castle. Bedale Hall marks the site of a castle built in the reign of King Edward I of England by Sir Bryan FitzAlan, Lord of the manor of Bedale and later Baron FitzAlan. After contributing to the defeat of Llywelyn ap Gruffudd, FitzAlan succeeded the Earl of Surrey as Guardian and Keeper of Scotland for Edward I and fought at the Battle of Falkirk (1298) and the siege of Caerlaverock in July 1300. Fitz Alan was involved in a fight with William Wallace that led to the death of a comrade-in-arms and held the castles of Dundee and Forfar, as well as those in the Scottish Lowlands: Roxburgh Castle and Jedburgh. This baron also built Killerby Castle and Askham Bryan in Yorkshire.

=== Stapleton, Lovell and others ===
His co-heir jure uxoris, Sir Gilbert de Stapleton of Carleton, Knt, was a conspirator in the assassination of Piers Gaveston. Sir Miles Stapleton was a founding Knight of the Order of the Garter, who fought at the Siege of Calais and at the Battle of Crécy. The Stapletons were "Lollard knights" and were Lords of the Manor of Bedale for generations. Bedale had traditionally been a Lancastrian area, until the Kingmaker, Clarence and Gloucester obtained Richmond and Middleham Castles. Following the Battle of Bosworth Field, Francis Lovell, 1st Viscount Lovell led the charge of insurgency in the Yorkist Stafford and Lovell Rebellion against Henry VII of England, attainted Earl of Richmond. The inhabitants of the region went on several recusancy strikes, such as the Pilgrimage of Grace and made trouble for John Nevill, 3rd Baron Latymer (Catherine Parr's husband before Henry VIII) in Snape Castle. This continued in the Rising of the North, with Henry VII's follower Simon Digby of Aiskew executed and replaced by Ambrose Dudley, 3rd Earl of Warwick, whose wife sold it to the native Sir William Theakston & John Jackson, after which it was resold to Cavalier Henry Peirse, whose descendants remain in town. During the English Civil War, Philip Stapleton continued in much of the same anti-Tudor & Stuart sentiment as Guy Fawkes, whose statement, when asked by one of the Scottish lords what he had intended to do with so much gunpowder, Fawkes answered him, "To blow you Scotch beggars back to your own native mountains!" Middleham Castle was subsequently ordered to be demolished by the Parliamentarians so that the Royalists could not take it again. However there is no documentary proof that this order was ever carried out.

=== Lords of the Manor ===
- Sir Alan FitzBrian, Knt, Lord of the manor of Bedale &c., (died shortly before 17 May 1267, killed in self-defence by Payn le Keu of Brandesburton) was a descendant of Conan I of Rennes, Duke of Brittany. He had two known sons, the younger being Theobald FitzAlan of Stow and Quy (d. 21 February 1308), and was succeeded at Bedale by the elder:
- Sir Brian FitzAlan Knt., (d. 1 June 1306), J.P., High Sheriff of Yorkshire, &c. He was summoned to parliament from 24 June 1295 to 22 January 1305 by Writs directed to Briano filio Alani whereby he is held to have become Lord FitzAlan. Upon his death any hereditary peerage created by the Writ of 1295 is held to be in abeyance.

His daughters, Agnes (born 1298) and Katherine (born 1300), were his co-heirs in his landed estates and manors. They were also co-heirs to his brother, Theobald. Katherine (d. before 7 August 1328) married Sir John de Grey, 1st Baron Grey de Rotherfield, KG (9 October 1300 – 1 September 1359).

The estate of Bedale and the Lordship of the Manor passed via the elder daughter, Agnes FitzAlan, whose marriage was granted on 10 May 1306 (when she was aged just 8) to Sir Miles de Stapleton of Carlton, Yorkshire, for his son:

- Sir Gilbert de Stapleton, Knt., (d. before 23 June 1324) a younger son, whom she married before 15 December 1317, in whose family Bedale remained for more than a century and was still in the possession of their great-great-grandson,
- Sir Miles Stapleton, who died 30 September 1466. His younger brother Brian Stapleton of Crispings (in Happisburgh) and Hasilden, Norfolk, died at about the same time and they both left only co-heiresses.

The Lordship of Bedale Manor is currently held jointly by Lord Beaumont, heir of both FitzAlan moiety lines, but the Beresford-Peirse baronets retain distinction as having de facto possession of the manor, which was originally forfeited by Lovell's attainder and passed on to numerous instalments of government figures and subsequent real-estate purchasers, whether Digby of Warwickshire, Dudley of Nottinghamshire, native Theakston and Jackson, then Peirse, after which it passed by inheritance to Beresford of Derbyshire.

== Later history ==
In the 18th century Bedale was a centre of horseracing. It was the place where races for three-year-olds were introduced in England (previously limited to older horses).

The Poor Relief Act 1722 enabled extension of what would be the Poor Law Unions and workhouses. Bedale had the largest house in the North Riding, capable of holding eighty paupers (Whitby ran a close second with 76 paupers listed there.)

== Governance ==
The electoral ward of the same name includes Aiskew parish, with a total population of 4,601 at the 2011 Census. In October 2018 the town was twinned with Azay-sur-Cher, a small town on the River Cher in the Loire Valley in France.

From 1974 to 2023 it was part of the Hambleton District. It is now administered by the unitary North Yorkshire Council.

Bedale was part of the Richmond (Yorks) parliamentary constituency until 2023. It was removed and added to the expanded Thirsk and Malton constituency, in part owing to areas from that constituency being transferred into the new seat of Wetherby and Easingwold.

== Churches ==
=== St Gregory's ===
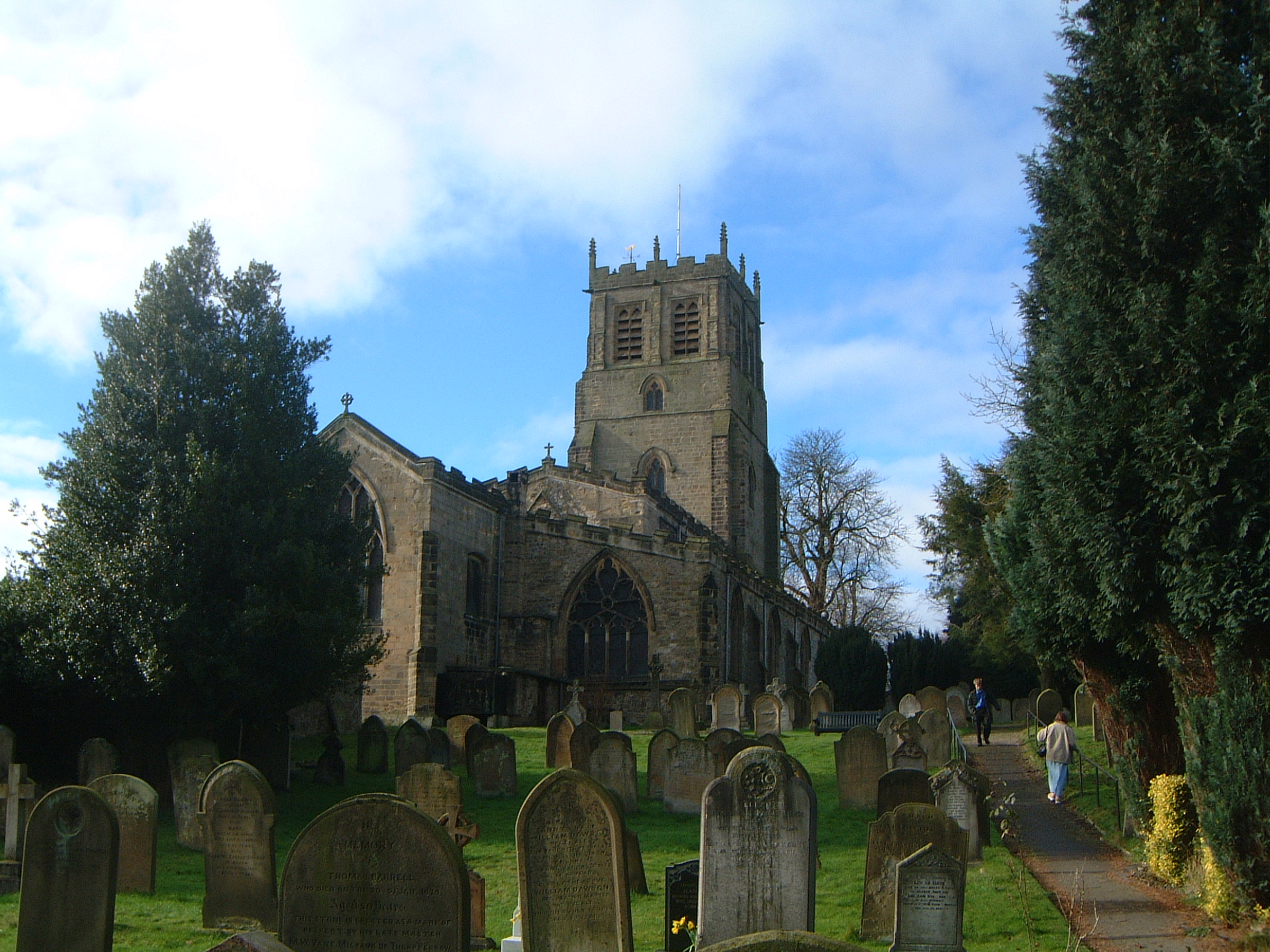
St Gregory's Church, Bedale

The church retains some Catholic relics, although during the English Civil War Puritans vandalised features such as statues. St Gregory's has a painting of St George slaying the dragon, unusual in that St George is depicted as being left-handed, and also contains a stone Viking Age grave marker, notable for a rare depiction of the legend of Wayland Smith. When Scots raided the countryside, inhabitants expected to find security in St Gregory's pele tower. There is a portcullis at the foot of the tower for extra security. Bedale St Gregory is the parish church in the Church of England in the rural deanery of Wensley within the Diocese of Leeds and its patron is the present Beresford-Peirse baronet. There is a plaque in the church listing all priests of the parish. There is another plaque of the previous landlords of Bedale, featuring coats of arms of these people or their families: Fitzalan, Stapleton, Grey of Rotherfield (related to Lady Jane Grey), Sheffield, de Warrene (Earl of Surrey), Brian de Thornhill, Lawrence de Thornhill, Richard, 1st Earl of Cornwall, Henry, 3rd Earl of Lancaster, Fitz Hugh of Tanfield, John of Brittany, Earl of Richmond, Marmion, Arthur III, Duke of Brittany and Ascough/Aiskew.

St Gregory's had a daughter church known as St Augustine's Church and Village Hall at Leeming Bar, no longer used for worship, and a Mission Chapel at Burrill. There are other local Anglican chapels, such as St Gregory's at Crakehall and St Patrick's at Patrick Brompton. Two other parishes with churches joined in the benefice with St Gregory's are St John the Baptist (Leeming village) and St Mary the Virgin (Thornton Watlass).

=== Others ===
The Catholic St Mary and St Joseph's Church, Bedale lies in Aiskew. There are Methodist chapels in Bedale, Leeming, Crakehall and Aiskew. Some buildings in the area also have their own private chapels, such as at Christ's Hospital in Firby.

== Transport ==
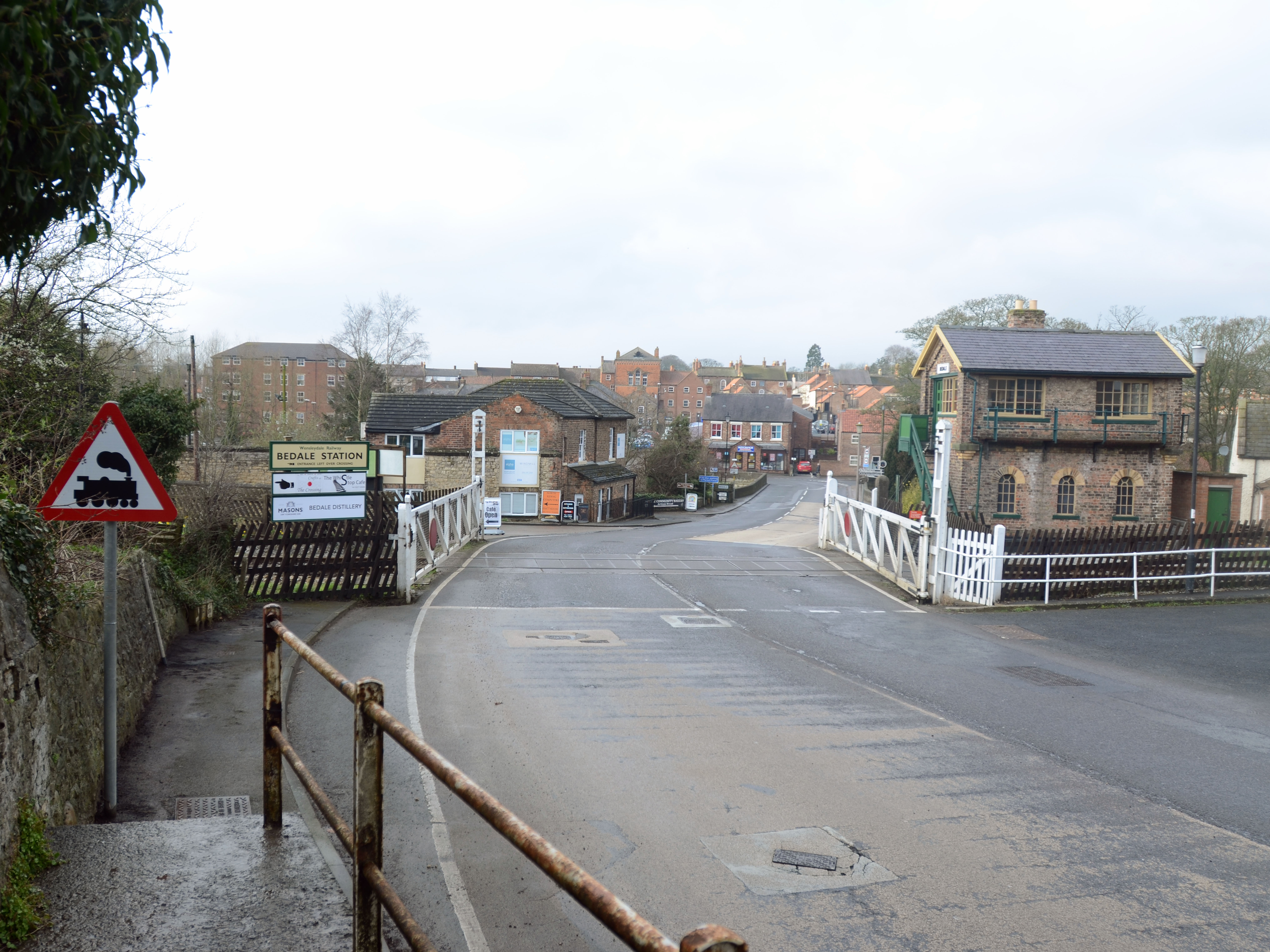
Looking into Bedale town from Aiskew across the level crossing. Bedale signal box is on the right and the bridge across Bedale Beck is just beyond the building centre left. The roadsign indicating a level crossing is incorrect – the barriers are clearly there!

Bedale lies on the B6285 road, which runs south and south east from Bedale and connects with the A6055 road at Burneston. The A684 road used to go through the town but a bypass was opened in August 2016, which means through traffic now avoids Leeming Bar, Aiskew and Bedale. The town is only two miles (three kilometres) west of the A1(M) at Leeming Bar via the A684 or via the adjoining village of Aiskew.

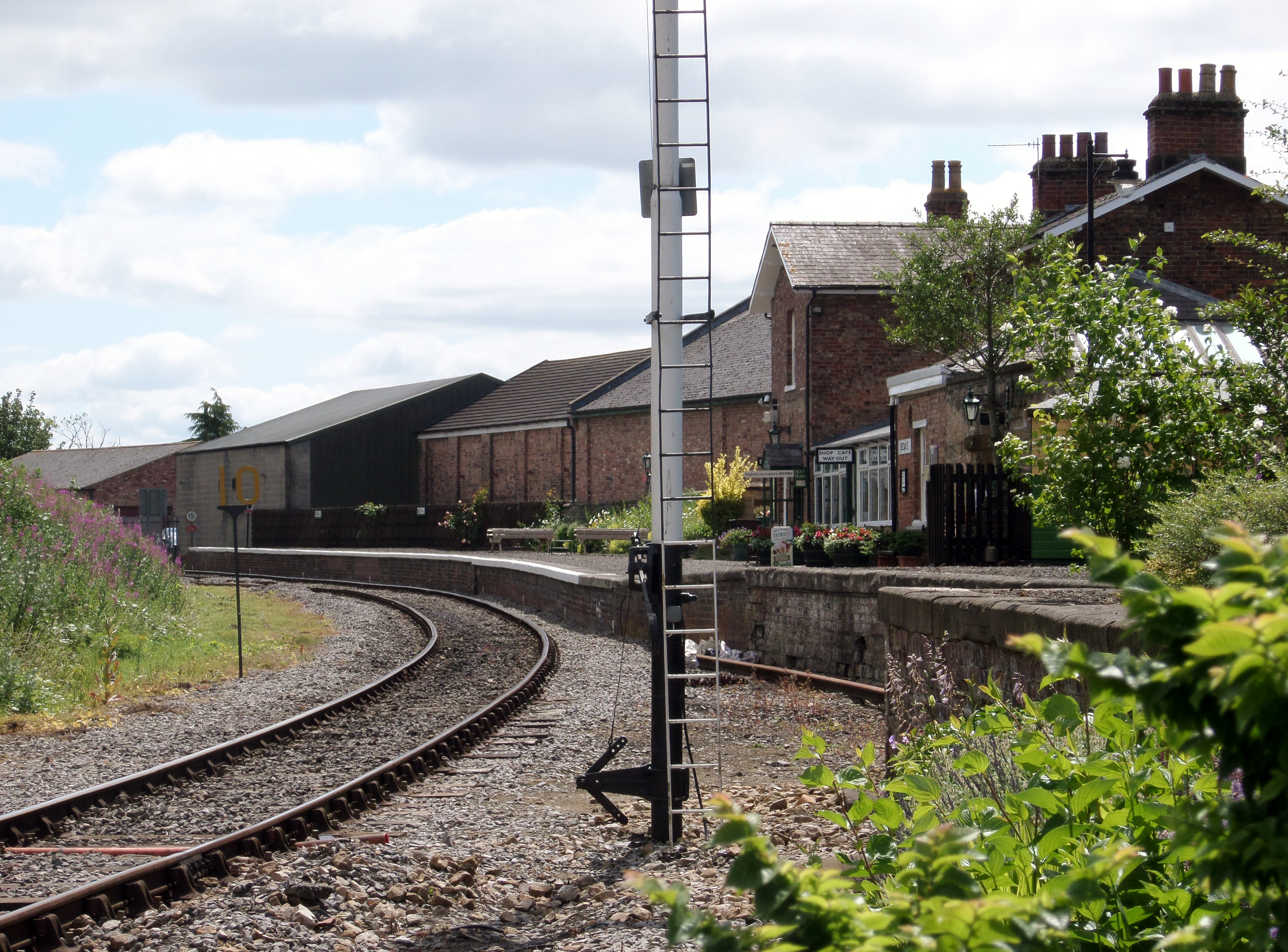
Bedale railway station

Bedale has a railway station on the preserved Wensleydale Railway. The station opened in 1855 and lasted almost a century before British Rail closed it in April 1954. The line remained open for local goods until the 1980s and for the limestone quarry at Redmire until 1992. The Ministry of Defence paid £750,000 to have the line upgraded and improved so that it could transfer heavy vehicles (mostly tanks) between Catterick Garrison and other MoD sites across the United Kingdom. These trains continue to run sporadically.

The line was eventually reopened in 2003 as a heritage railway between Leeming Bar and Redmire. The station is actually in Aiskew, since it lies east of Bedale Beck, which forms the boundary between the two. The line was later extended to Scruton as well as to the west of Northallerton.

Work on making Bedale Beck navigable to barges down to the River Swale at Gatenby began in 1768 and resulted in an area at the south end of the town known as The Harbour. The plan was abandoned in 1855 when the railway was opened but the weir and some iron moorings still exist on the beck just south of the Bedale to Aiskew road bridge. A public footpath runs along the Bedale side of the beck from the bridge for more than one mile (1.5 kilometres), passing the leech house, the harbour and the sewage works, first behind houses and then emerging into open country with fields to the west.

== Education ==
Bedale has three schools: Bedale Primary School, Bedale High School and Mowbray School.

== Economy and attractions ==
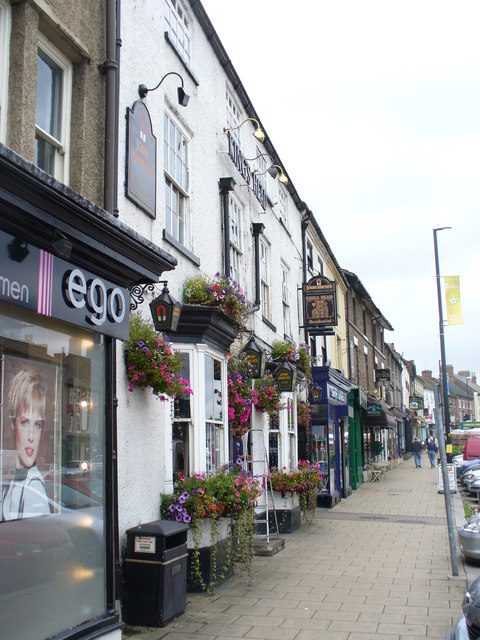
Bedale shops

Historic buildings include a unique 18th-century Leech House formerly used as an apothecary's store for leeches, an underground ice house in the grounds of the Hall used for preserving food and the 14th-century Grade I listed Bedale Market Cross. Bedale has a small museum, numerous Georgian buildings (though many of them are much older and only look Georgian) and a railway station on the Wensleydale Railway, which runs to Redmire via Leyburn. The Thorp Perrow Arboretum lies nearby, as do the villages of Burneston, Burrill, Cowling, Exelby and Firby.

The town has many independent shops, a Co-op Food supermarket, pubs and eating places along its market place. It holds a market every Tuesday on the cobbles that line the market place, and there is a car-boot sale in the park every Saturday morning from April to October approximately. It also has a leisure centre with full gym, 25-metre swimming pool and astroturf sports pitches. Bedale Athletic Sports Association provides football, cricket, hockey, squash and tennis. Big Sheep Little Cow Farm is a petting zoo next to the railway line and Bedale Beck.

Bedale Golf Club is on the northern edge of the town where the B6285 meets the A684 to Leyburn. The golf club was founded in 1894. The course is 18 holes in wooded parkland.

Bedale also has a brass band with a 25-year history of providing musical education and entertainment for the local community.

== Media ==
Local news and television programmes are provided by BBC North East and Cumbria and ITV Tyne Tees. Television signals are received from the Bilsdale transmitter.

Local radio stations are BBC Radio York on 104.3 FM, Greatest Hits Radio York & North Yorkshire on 103.5 FM and Dales Radio on 104.9 FM.

The town is served by the local newspapers, The Northern Echo and Darlington & Stockton Times.

== Filmography ==
The 1945 film The Way to the Stars was filmed with Bedale as the local town for the fictional RAF Halfpenny Field and some of the locations remain little changed. The film stars Sir John Mills and Sir Michael Redgrave as RAF pilots and Bedale was one of a number of locations used during filming.

== See also ==
- Listed buildings in Bedale
