= Bedale Beck =

Watercourse in North Yorkshire, England

Bedale Beck Burton Beck Crakehall Beck Leeming Beck Newton Beck
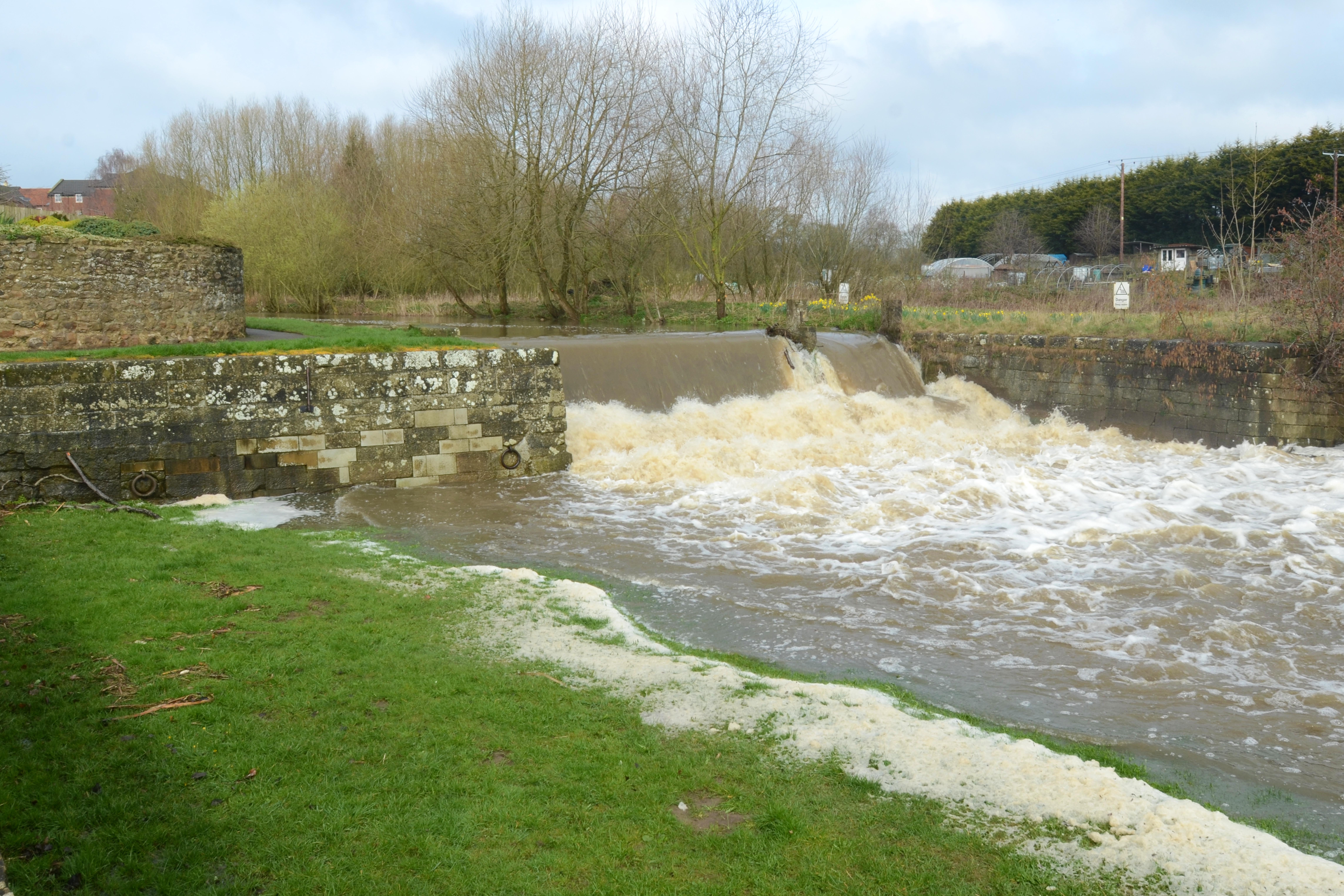
- The Harbour at Bedale

Location
- Country: England
- County: North Yorkshire

Physical characteristics
- Length: 25.7 mi (41.4 km)

Basin features
- River system: River Swale

Bedale Beck is a small river that flows through the eastern end of Wensleydale and passes through Crakehall, Bedale and Leeming, before entering the River Swale between Morton-on-Swale and Gatenby. Between source and mouth its length is 25.7 miles (41 km).

== Route ==
The beck begins at Constable Burton with the confluence of three becks (Bellerby and Burton, Whipperdale and a third unnamed beck), all of which rise in the upland north of Leyburn, with Bellerby Beck spilling off the moor above the village of Bellerby. At Constable Burton it flows under the A684 road and between there and Patrick Brompton it is shown on maps as Burton Beck, Leeming Beck and Newton Beck. At Crakehall it is named Crakehall Beck.

It takes on the name Bedale Beck proper just east of Crakehall before it flows south under the new A684 bypass and into the town of Bedale, where it forms the boundary between the civil parishes of Aiskew and Bedale. After Bedale it flows east then north, going under the A6055 road and the A1(M) before changing direction and going east along the northern edge of RAF Leeming. It joins the River Swale between Morton-on-Swale and Gatenby.

== History ==
The beck was the location of water mills, at least two being recorded in the Bedale area by 1297. The most famous is the mill that still exists at Crakehall, which was renovated in 1980 and again in the new millennium and grinds corn on special open days. Both of the mills at Aiskew and Crakehall had millraces. Crakehall's is still there and transports water. Aiskew Mill had closed but was reopened in 2010 as a community bakery.

In the 18th century an attempt was made to make the beck navigable from Bedale to the River Swale. The plan was abandoned owing to a lack of investment and in 1855 the railway was opened, which superseded the plans for a canal. The area below the weir and the sluice gate are still known as 'The Harbour'. The scheme was part of a grander plan to convert the Swale into a navigation from the River Ure up to Bedale, which involved installing a lock just west of Leeming village, known as Leeming Lock. The lock survived until it was blown up in the Second World War, though no-one knows if it was deliberate or accidental. The plan also meant diverting the watercourse that flows past Floodbridge Farm and now joins Bedale Beck further downstream than previously.

Flooding on the beck has led to problems. In 1900 floodwaters undermined the trackbed of the railway line west of Bedale, causing a locomotive to derail and killing its fireman.

== Ecology ==
Along with others that feed into the River Swale in Hambleton, Bedale Beck has been identified as having poor ecological quality and having too much sediment entering the water, which damages the habitat for fish, raises phosphate levels and contributes to flooding.

Both Bedale and Leeming have been identified as being the main receptors of flooding along the beck owing to their low-lying and flat nature (especially between Bedale and Leeming, which has been described as a 'level floodplain') in comparison to the rest of the beck's course.
