= Hambleton District =

Former local government district in England

- District
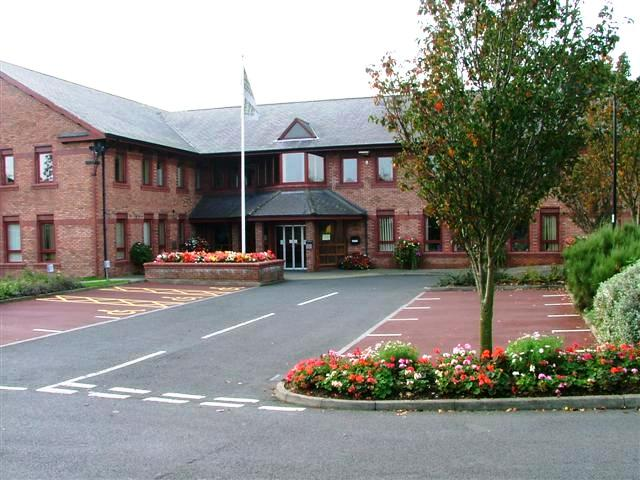
- Council Offices, Northallerton

- Coat of Arms of the District Council

- Shown within North Yorkshire
- Coordinates: 54.334°N 1.429°W
- Sovereign state: United Kingdom
- Constituent country: England
- Region: Yorkshire and the Humber
- Administrative county: North Yorkshire
- Admin. HQ: Northallerton

Government
  - Type: Hambleton District Council
  - Leadership: Leader & Cabinet

Area
  - Total: 506.27 sq mi (1,311.23 km^{2})

Population (2021)
  - Total: 91,037
  - Density: 179.82/sq mi (69.429/km^{2})
- Time zone: UTC+0 (GMT)
  - Summer (DST): UTC+1 (BST)
- ONS code: 36UC (ONS); E07000164 (GSS)
- Ethnicity: 99.2% White
- Website: www.hambleton.gov.uk

Hambleton was a local government district in North Yorkshire, England. The administrative centre was Northallerton, and the district included the outlying towns and villages of Bedale, Thirsk, Great Ayton, Stokesley, and Easingwold.

The district was formed by the Local Government Act 1972 on 1 April 1974, as a merger of Northallerton Urban District, Bedale Rural District, Easingwold Rural District, Northallerton Rural District, and parts of Thirsk Rural District, Stokesley Rural District and Croft Rural District, all in the North Riding of Yorkshire. It was subsumed into the new unitary authority of North Yorkshire Council on 1 April 2023.

== Geography ==
Hambleton covered an area of 1,311.17 km² most of which, 1,254.90 km^{2}, was green space. The district was named after the Hambleton Hills, part of the North York Moors National Park, on the eastern edge of the district. This area was the subject of a national habitat protection scheme as articulated in the United Kingdom's Biodiversity Action Plan. About 75% of the district was in the Vales of Mowbray and of York. These two vales consist largely of low lying and intensively worked arable land which is mostly used for farming. 16% of the former district was within the North York Moors National Park and just over 1% was in the York green belt zone.

== Towns ==
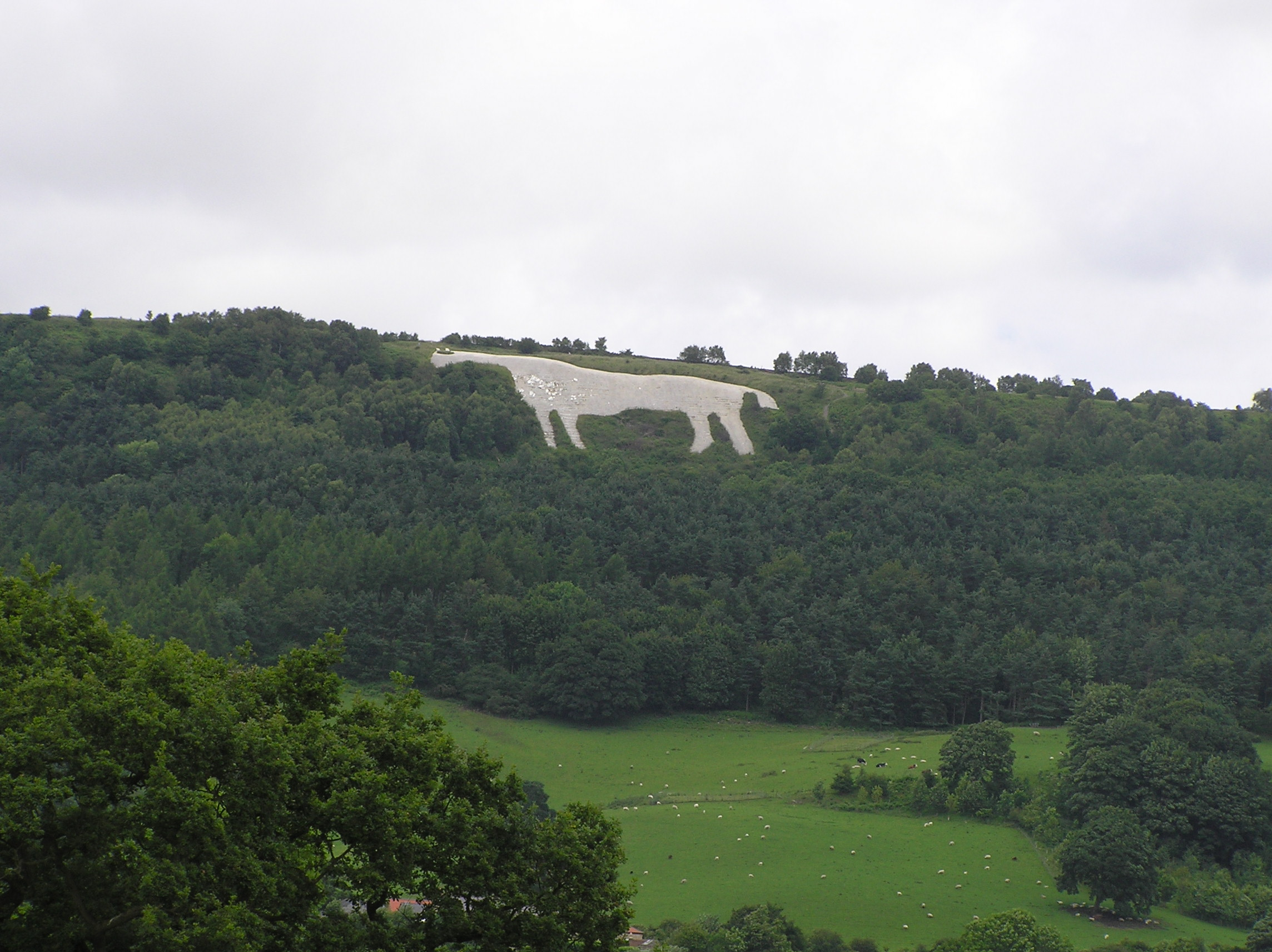
The Kilburn White Horse

Towns that were in the district are listed below. Northallerton housed the headquarters of Hambleton District Council. The district was also the location of 17 wards and 177 parishes.

- Bedale
- Easingwold
- Northallerton
- Stokesley
- Thirsk

== District Council ==
=== Abolition ===
In July 2021 the Ministry of Housing, Communities and Local Government announced that in April 2023, the non-metropolitan county would be reorganised into a unitary authority. Hambleton District Council was abolished and its functions were transferred to a new single authority for the non-metropolitan county of North Yorkshire.

== Demographics ==
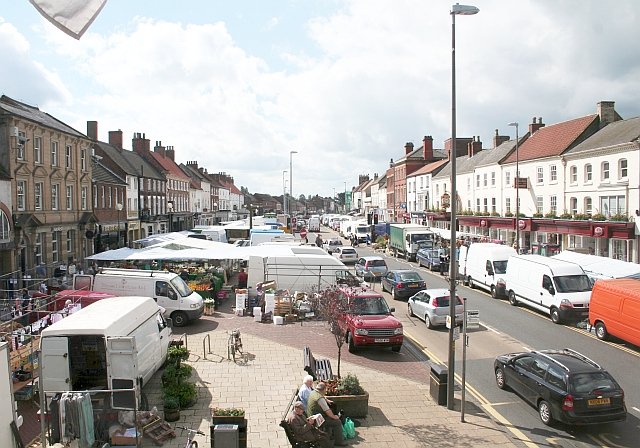
Northallerton

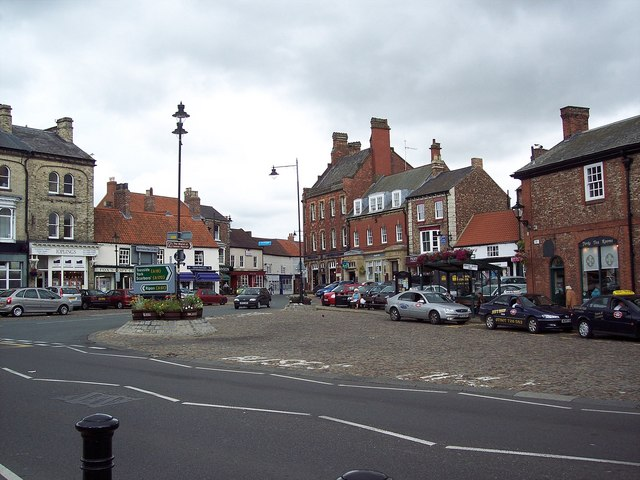
Thirsk

In 2007 Hambleton had an estimated population of 86,900 an increase of 3.2% on the population of 84,200 recorded in the 2001 UK census. In the 2001 census 83% of respondents identified their religion as Christians above the national average for England which was 71.74%. No other religion accounted for more than 0.2% of the population; the next two largest groups of respondents were those with no religion, at 10.40%, and those who did not state a religion, at 6.14%.
