= Thomas Howard, 3rd Duke of Norfolk =

English politician and military officer (1473–1554)

His Grace The Duke of Norfolk KG, PC
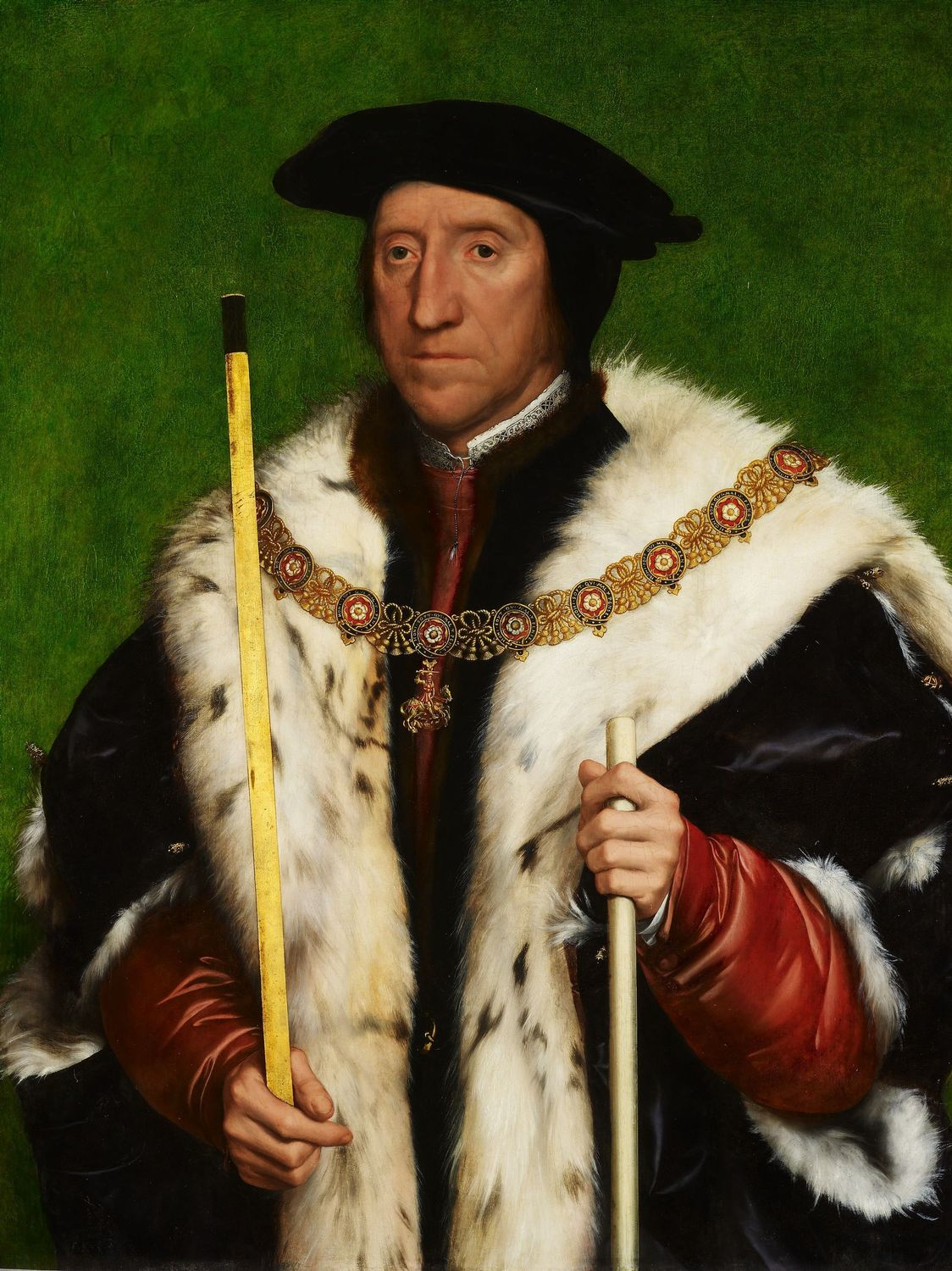
- Portrait by Hans Holbein the Younger, c. 1539

Lord High Treasurer
- In office 4 December 1522 – 12 December 1546
- Monarch: Henry VIII
- Preceded by: Thomas Howard, 2nd Duke of Norfolk
- Succeeded by: Edward Seymour, 1st Duke of Somerset

Personal details
- Born: 10 March 1473
- Died: 25 August 1554 (aged 81) Kenninghall, Norfolk
- Resting place: Church of St Michael the Archangel, Framlingham, Suffolk
- Spouse(s): Anne of York (m. 1494 or 1495; died 1511); Elizabeth Stafford (m. 1513)
- Children: Henry Howard, Earl of Surrey; Katherine Stanley, Countess of Derby; Mary FitzRoy, Duchess of Richmond and Somerset; Thomas Howard, 1st Viscount Howard of Bindon
- Parents: Thomas Howard, 2nd Duke of Norfolk (father); Elizabeth Tilney (mother)
- Religion: Roman Catholicism

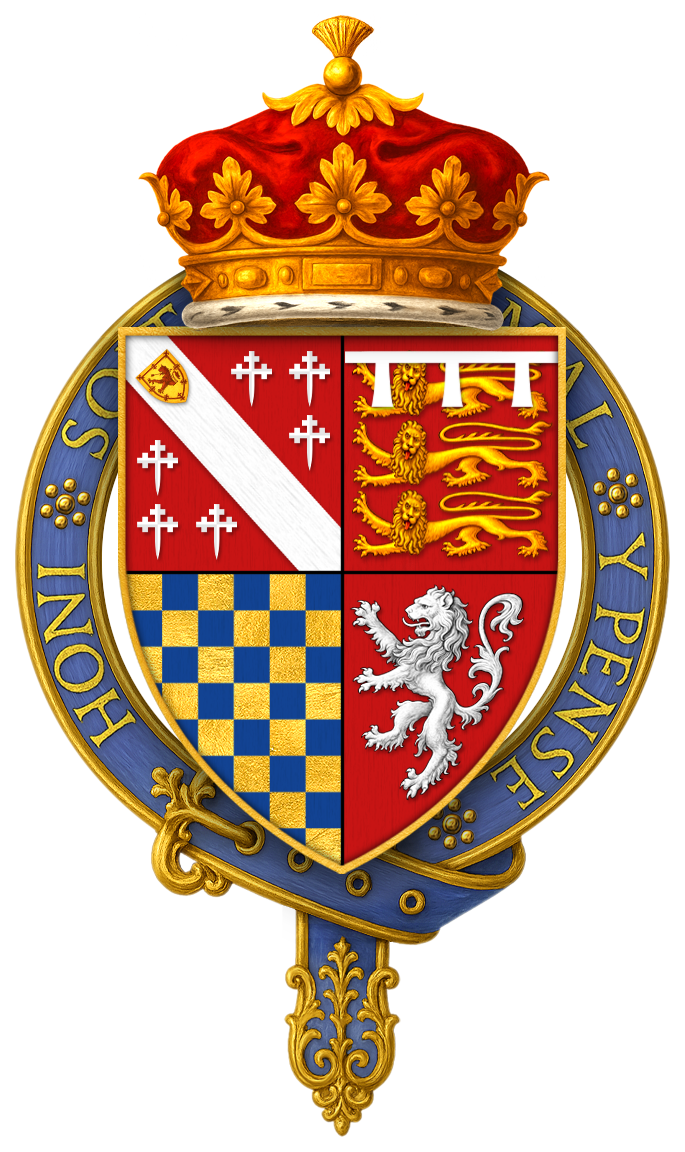
Arms of Thomas Howard, 3rd Duke of Norfolk, KG: Quarterly of 4: 1: Gules, on a bend between six cross-crosslets fitchy argent an escutcheon or charged with a demi-lion rampant pierced through the mouth by an arrow within a double tressure flory counterflory of the first (Howard, with augmentation of honour); 2: Gules, three lions passant guardant in pale or armed and langued azure a label of three points argent (Plantagenet, arms of Thomas of Brotherton, 1st Earl of Norfolk); 3: Chequy or and azure (de Warenne, Earl of Surrey); 4: Gules, a lion rampant argent (Mowbray)

Thomas Howard, 3rd Duke of Norfolk, KG, PC (10 March 1473 – 25 August 1554) was a politician and military officer of the Tudor era. He was an uncle of two of the wives of King Henry VIII, Anne Boleyn and Catherine Howard, both of whom were beheaded, and played a major role in the machinations affecting these royal marriages. After falling from favour in 1546, Norfolk was stripped of his dukedom and imprisoned in the Tower of London, avoiding execution when Henry VIII died on 28 January 1547.

He was released on the accession of the Roman Catholic Queen Mary I, whom he aided in securing the throne, thus setting the stage for tensions between his Catholic family and the Protestant royal line that would be continued by Mary's half-sister, Elizabeth I.

== Early life ==
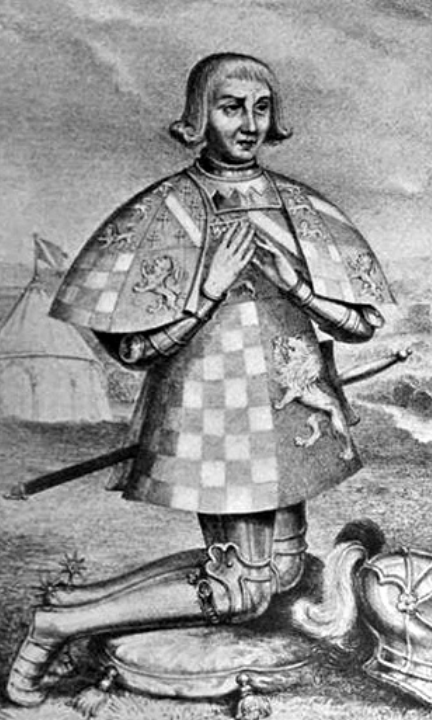
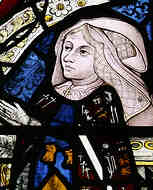
Thomas Howard, 2nd Duke of Norfolk, and Elizabeth Tilney, Thomas' parents

Thomas was the son of Sir Thomas Howard, later 2nd Duke of Norfolk, with his first wife, Elizabeth Tilney, the daughter of Sir Frederick Tilney and widow of Sir Humphrey Bourchier, and the grandson of John Howard, 1st Baron Howard, later 1st Duke of Norfolk. Through his great-grandmother Margaret Mowbray, Howard was a descendant of Thomas of Brotherton, 1st Earl of Norfolk, the sixth son of King Edward I of England. Through his great-grandfather Sir Robert Howard, of Tendring Hall, Stoke-by-Nayland, Suffolk, Howard was descended from Richard, 1st Earl of Cornwall, the second son of King John, who had an illegitimate son, named Richard (died 1296), whose daughter, Joan of Cornwall, married Sir John Howard (d. shortly July 1331). Likewise, through his ancestor Isabel d'Aubigny, wife of John Fitzalan, 3rd Lord of Clun and Oswestry, Howard was descended from Roger Bigod, the first Lord of Norfolk after the Norman Conquest. In 1483, his father and grandfather were created Earl of Surrey and Duke of Norfolk respectively in reward for their loyalty to the Duke of Gloucester, who became King Richard III after usurping the throne from his nephews, the sons of Edward IV, and in 1485 the Howards fought on the side of Richard III at the Battle of Bosworth, where the 1st Duke lost his life and the Earl of Surrey was badly wounded. As the battle resulted in the accession of Henry VII Tudor, the Howards' loyalty to the losing side resulted in the forfeiture of their titles and most of their properties. Nevertheless, they soon began to be rehabilitated, and in 1489 Thomas' father was restored as Earl of Surrey.

In April 1497 his mother died, and in August of that year, by papal dispensation, his father married for the second time Agnes Tilney, Thomas' mother's cousin.

Howard was an able soldier, and was often employed in military operations. In 1497, he served in a campaign against the Scots under the command of his father, who knighted him on 30 September 1497. He was made a Knight of the Garter after the accession of his nephew by marriage, King Henry VIII, and became the King's close companion, with lodgings at court. His first wife, Anne of York, daughter of Edward IV and thereby Henry's aunt, died in November 1511, and early in 1513, Howard married Elizabeth Stafford, the daughter of Edward Stafford, 3rd Duke of Buckingham and Eleanor Percy, and the granddaughter of Henry Percy, 4th Earl of Northumberland. Through his mother Katherine Woodville, Elizabeth's father was a first cousin to Howard's first wife. On 4 May 1513, he was appointed Lord High Admiral, a position previously held by his brother, Edward Howard, who had died on 25 April, to combat the French navy. Surrey and his sons Thomas and Edmund had hoped to lead the English expedition against France, but were left behind when the King departed for Calais at the end of June. Shortly thereafter King James IV of Scotland launched an invasion into England (despite being married to Princess Margaret Tudor, sister of Henry VIII) in fulfilment of his alliance with France, and Thomas along with his brother Edmund, joined their father and the barons Dacre and Monteagle in leading the army, which despite their numerical inferiority, managed to decisively crush the Scottish forces at the Battle of Flodden, near Branxton, Northumberland, on 9 September. The Scots lost thousands of men, and James IV lost his life in the battle.

Creation of Earl of Surrey Act 1513
- Act of Parliament
- Parliament of England
- Long title: An Act for the confirmation of letters patents made to the earl of Surry.
- Citation: 5 Hen. 8. c. 11 (Note: This is the citation in The Statutes of the Realm.); 5 Hen. 8. c. 3 Pr. (Note: This is the citation in The Statutes at Large.)
- Territorial extent: England and Wales

Dates
- Royal assent: 4 March 1514
- Commencement: 23 January 1514 (Note: Start of session.)
- Repealed: 31 July 1978
Other legislation
Repealed by	Statute Law (Repeals) Act 1978
Relates to	Restitution in blood of Thomas Howard, Earl of Surrey.; Creation of Duke of Norfolk Act 1513; Creation of Duke of Suffolk Act 1513; Attainder of Duke of Norfolk and Earl of Surrey Act 1546; Duke of Norfolk's Restitution Act 1553

Status: Repealed

Text of statute as originally enacted

Howard augmentation of honour, awarded to Thomas Howard, 2nd Duke of Norfolk after the Battle of Flodden (1513): Or, a Scottish demi-lion rampant pierced through the mouth by an arrow within a double tressure flory-counterflory-gules, to be borne on the bend in the Howard arms

Howard's Coat of arms with "Flodden augmentation"

Leading the victorious forces at Flodden gave the Howards enormous prestige both socially and at court, and the Howard coat of arms was changed in honour of the victory, incorporating the Scottish lion pierced through the mouth with an arrow within a double tressure flory-counterflory-gules, an emblem of the Scottish royal arms granted by Scottish kings on rare occasions as a special mark of favour. The grant to Howard was thus a blatant heraldic insult to the kings of Scotland. On 1 February 1514, Howard's father, then Earl of Surrey, was created Duke of Norfolk (technically a new creation, but treated for all practical purposes as a recreation of the forfeited title previously held by his father), and by letters patent issued on the same day, Howard was created Earl of Surrey. Both were granted lands in support of their new dignities, although Henry, ever cautious of rivals, scattered the grants across the realm to prevent a Howard landed base in East Anglia. Over the next few years, the younger Thomas Howard served King Henry VIII in a variety of ways. In September 1514, he escorted the King's sister Mary to France for her forthcoming marriage to King Louis XII of France. In 1517, he quelled a May Day riot in London with the use of soldiers.

== Rise to power ==
On 10 March 1520 Howard was appointed Lord Deputy of Ireland. By July 1520, he entered upon the thankless task of endeavouring to keep Ireland in order. His letters contain accounts of attempts to pacify the rival factions of Gerald FitzGerald, 9th Earl of Kildare and Piers Butler, 8th Earl of Ormonde, and are full of demands for more money and troops.

At the end of 1521 Surrey was recalled from Ireland to take command of the English fleet in naval operations against France. His ships were ill-provisioned, and his attack consisted of a series of raids near the French coast for the purpose of inflicting as much damage as possible on the French navy. Howard's ships besieged the strategic port of Brest but when he abandoned the siege, he left Vice-Admiral William FitzWilliam on station to blockade the port. The English navy patrolled the Brittany coast for the next three months, but was unable to gain a decisive victory even with their Spanish allies. In July 1522, the forces commanded by Surrey burned Morlaix, and over the next few months razed everything around Boulogne, until the winter caused the fleet to withdraw to England. The sea patrol was abandoned with little achieved.

On 4 December 1522, Howard was made Lord High Treasurer upon his father's resignation of the office, and on 21 May 1524, he succeeded his father as Duke of Norfolk. His liking for war brought him into conflict with Cardinal Thomas Wolsey, who preferred diplomacy in the conduct of foreign affairs. In 1523, Wolsey had secured to Charles Brandon, 1st Duke of Suffolk the reversion of the office of Earl Marshal by Howard's father, and in 1525, he was replaced as Lord Admiral by Henry FitzRoy, Duke of Richmond, the King's illegitimate but acknowledged son, who a few years later became Norfolk's son-in-law. Finding himself pushed aside, Howard spent considerable time away from court between 1525 and 1527–28.

In the mid-1520s, Howard's niece, Anne Boleyn, had caught the eye of King Henry VIII, thereby reviving his political fortunes with his involvement in the King's attempt to annul his marriage to Catherine of Aragon. By 1529, matters of state were being increasingly handled by Norfolk, his brother-in-law Thomas Boleyn, and the Duke of Suffolk, who pressed King Henry VIII to remove Cardinal Wolsey. In October, the King sent Howard and the Duke of Suffolk to obtain the great seal from the Cardinal.

In early 1530, Anne Boleyn was promoting a marriage between her first cousin and eldest son of Norfolk, Henry Howard, Earl of Surrey and the King's daughter, Princess Mary. The Duke was enthusiastic about the match as it might give him greater political influence at court and put his family closer to the throne. Boleyn may have considered the match to be a way of neutralising the threat Mary posed to the succession of any children Anne might have by the King. But she changed her mind, fearing that the Duke could use the match to support Mary's claim to the throne as well as supporting Catherine of Aragon in the annulment proceedings which were still continuing, and thereby prevent the Church of England's break from Rome. By October 1530, Boleyn persuaded her reluctant uncle to arrange instead for Surrey to marry Frances de Vere, one of the daughters of John de Vere, 15th Earl of Oxford with his second wife, Elizabeth Trussell.

In November 1530, Wolsey was arrested but while on his way from York to London the Cardinal became seriously ill and died in Leicester. Howard benefited from Wolsey's fall, becoming the King's leading councillor and applying himself energetically in the King's efforts to find a way out of his marriage to Queen Catherine.

== Later career ==
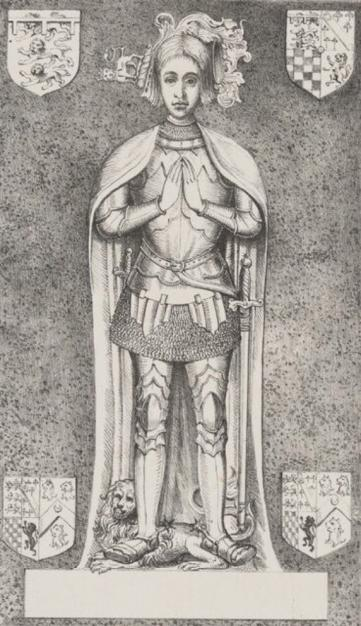
Sketch of the grave of the 2nd Duke of Norfolk, as it probably looked at Thetford Priory. After the Priory Church was closed in 1540, the 3rd Duke had his father's remains moved to Framlingham Church

Assisting the King in the annulment of his first marriage, added to his extensive loyalty and services to the Crown, brought Howard extensive rewards in the form of monastic lands in Norfolk and Suffolk, employment on diplomatic missions, and being named a knight of the French Order of St Michael in 1532 and Earl Marshal of England on 28 May 1533. In November of that same year, his daughter Mary was married to the Duke of Richmond, Henry FitzRoy, a union that was politically advantageous to Norfolk. Given that Henry VIII did not yet have a legitimate male heir and Princess Mary had been removed from the line of succession, Richmond was seen by many as a potential heir to the throne. The marriage was never consummated by order of the King due to the youth of the couple, and it was then cut short by FitzRoy's death in 1536.

Thomas Howard's marriage to his second wife, Lady Elizabeth Stafford, which had apparently been mutually affectionate at first, deteriorated in 1527 when he took a mistress, Elizabeth Holland (died 1547/8), whom he installed in the Howard household. Lady Elizabeth formally separated from her husband in the 1530s. She claimed that in March 1534, the Duke of Norfolk 'locked me up in a chamber, [and] took away my jewels and apparel'. Howard then moved her to Redbourn, Hertfordshire, where she lived as a virtual prisoner with a modest annual allowance of only £200. She also claimed to have been physically maltreated by Howard and his household servants.

On 10 March 1536, the Earl of Surrey's eldest son Thomas was born. On 2 May of the same year, Anne Boleyn and her brother George Boleyn, Viscount Rochford were arrested by order of the King. They were tried in the great hall of the Tower of London. Norfolk presided over the trial as Lord High Steward. The Boleyn siblings were sentenced to death; Rochford was executed on 17 May, and Anne two days later. Following his niece's fall from grace, Howard's power and influence at court waned for a time.

In July, the Duke of Richmond, Norfolk's only son-in-law, died at the age of 17 and was buried at Thetford Priory, one of the Howard properties.

When the Pilgrimage of Grace broke out in Lincolnshire and the northern counties in October 1536 in response to the suppression of monasteries across England, Norfolk and his eldest son, the Earl of Surrey shared command of the King's forces with George Talbot, Earl of Shrewsbury. The Howards and Talbot opened negotiations with the main leader of the insurgents, Robert Aske at Scawsby Leys, near Doncaster, where Aske had assembled between 30,000 and 40,000 people. The 24 Articles to the King, also called "The Commons' Petition", was given to Norfolk to present to the King. The Duke promised to do so, and also promised a general pardon for the rebels, that Parliament would meet in York in a year, and another pardon, this time directed at the abbeys until the Parliament had met. Jesse Childs (a biographer of the Earl of Surrey, Norfolk's son) specifically notes that Henry VIII did not authorise Norfolk to grant remedies for the grievances. The Duke's enemies had told the King that the Howards could put down a rebellion of peasants if they wanted to, suggesting that Norfolk, being Catholic, sympathised with the Pilgrimage. Howard and Shrewsbury were outnumbered: they had between 5,000 and 7,000 men but there were more than 40,000 rebels. Upon seeing their numbers, Norfolk negotiated and made promises to avoid being massacred by insurgent forces. However, the promises of both the King and Parliament were never fulfilled and in January 1537 Bigod's rebellion broke out. In response to this, forces led by Norfolk headed to the north of England, where they carried out a policy of brutal repression on behalf of the King, despite the fact that the Duke himself was a Catholic.

In 1539, Norfolk, who was a conservative, was seriously challenging the reformist religious policies of the King's chief minister, Thomas Cromwell. In that year, Henry VIII sought to have Parliament put an end to diversity in religious opinion. On 5 May, the House of Lords appointed a committee to consider questions of doctrine. Although he was not a member of the committee, on 16 May, Howard presented six conservative articles of religion to Parliament for consideration. On 30 May, the Six Articles and the penalties for failure to conform to them were enacted into law, and on 28 June, received royal assent.

In February 1540, Norfolk tried to save Thetford Priory from closure, petitioning Henry VIII for the Priory's church to become a collegiate church on the grounds that not only Anne of York, Howard's first wife and aunt to the King, but also the monarch's illegitimate son, the Duke of Richmond, were buried there. The Dean was to be Prior William Ixworth, and the six prebendaries and eight secular canons to be the monks of the former house. The request had no effect. The same request was made to the King by other nobles, and he refused them all; at the same time however, Henry VIII ordered that the dissolution of the monasteries be briefly suspended, so that everyone who wished had time to rebury the remains of their relations. Howard moved those of his own relations to the Church of St Michael the Archangel, Framlingham. After the dissolution of the monastic church, the lands were given to the Duke.

On 29 June 1539, Howard, the Duke of Suffolk and Cromwell dined with the King as guests of the Archbishop of Canterbury, Thomas Cranmer at Lambeth Palace. During a heated discussion about Cardinal Wolsey, Cromwell charged Thomas Howard with disloyalty; Howard in turn called Cromwell a liar. Their mutual hostility was now out in the open. Cromwell inadvertently played into Howard's hands by taking the initiative in the King's marriage to Anne of Cleves. The King's disillusionment with Anne's physical appearance when he met her, and his desire to have the marriage annulled after the wedding had taken place, gave Howard an opportunity to bring down Cromwell. On 10 June 1540 Cromwell was arrested at a Privy Council meeting on charges of high treason, and the Duke of Norfolk snatched the St George's collar (insignia of the Order of the Garter) from Cromwell's shoulders, saying: "A traitor must not wear it". On 9 July, King Henry's marriage to Anne of Cleves was annulled. By then Catherine Howard, another of the Duke's nieces, had already caught the King's eye. Henry and Catherine were married at a private ceremony at Oatlands Palace on 28 July, the same day that Cromwell was executed. As a result of this marriage, for a time, Howard enjoyed political prominence and material rewards. According to Nicholas Sander, the religiously conservative Howards may have seen Catherine as a figurehead for a fight to restore Catholicism in England.

Despite the fact that the King was much in love with Catherine, referring to her as his "rose without a thorn", the marriage quickly came to a disastrous end. While Henry and Queen Catherine were on progress during the autumn of 1541, the religious reformer John Lassells and his sister Mary Hall told Archbishop Cranmer of the Queen's premarital sexual indiscretions. On 1 November 1541 Cranmer revealed Queen Catherine's extramarital behaviour in a letter to the King, who vented his wrath on the Howard family, accusing them of concealing the Queen's misconduct. Catherine was condemned by a bill of attainder and was executed on 13 February 1542. Various members of the Duke's family were punished, including his daughter Mary, his stepmother the widowed Duchess of Norfolk, and the latter's son William Howard, who was Thomas's half-brother. Norfolk tried to detach himself from the situation by retiring to his residence at Kenninghall, from where he wrote a letter of apology to the King blaming both his niece and his stepmother for the scandal. However, the French ambassador Charles de Marillac wrote on 17 January 1542, that the Duke had not only escaped punishment, but had apparently been restored to his "full former credit and authority".

Howard was appointed Lieutenant-General north of the River Trent on 29 January 1541, and Captain-General in a campaign against the Scots in October 1542 after the battle of Haddon Rig. In June 1543, he declared war on France in the King's name and was appointed Lieutenant-General of the army. During the campaign of May–October 1544, he besieged Montreuil, while King Henry VIII captured Boulogne, before returning home. Complaining of lack of provisions and munitions, Howard eventually raised the siege of Montreuil, and realising that Boulogne could not realistically be held by the English for long, he left it garrisoned and withdrew to Calais, for which he was severely rebuked by the King.

== Imprisonment and release ==
During the last years of the reign of Henry VIII, the Seymour family, and the King's last wife, Catherine Parr, supporters of the Reformation were gaining greater power and influence at court, while conservative Norfolk was left politically isolated. Howard attempted to form an alliance with the Seymours by marrying his widowed daughter, Mary to Thomas Seymour, 1st Baron Seymour of Sudeley. The King gave his approval for the match, but her brother, Henry Howard, Earl of Surrey, objected strongly, as did the Duchess herself and the marriage did not take place. Howard's eldest son and heir, Henry, Earl of Surrey, was repeatedly imprisoned for rash behaviour and was accused of assuming the royal arms of Edward the Confessor as part of his personal heraldry. Surrey was entitled to bear Edward the Confessor's arms, but doing so was an act of pride, and provocative in the eyes of the Crown. On 12 December 1546 both Norfolk and his son were arrested and sent to the Tower.

In the early morning of 14 December, Howard's residence in Kenninghall was raided by Richard Southwell, John Gates and Wymond Carew, looking for evidence of Surrey's treason. Arriving at the house, the men found the Duke's daughter, Mary, his daughter-in-law Frances, who was pregnant with their fifth child, and Norfolk's mistress, Bess Holland, alone in the home. Southwell and his companions arrived, placed men at all the doors and sent for the Duchess of Richmond and Bess Holland, 'who were only just risen', Southwell reported.

The fate of Norfolk's personal property is well documented, for the inventories drawn up at the time of his arrest were annotated, as goods were sold or given away.

On 24 December, the elder Howard acknowledged that he had "concealed high treason, in keeping secret the false acts of my son, Henry Earl of Surrey, in using the arms of St. Edward the Confessor, which pertain only to kings", and offered his lands to the King.

There were also religious motives behind Surrey's fall from grace and Norfolk's imprisonment. The Duke was the premier Catholic nobleman of England and his son was also a Catholic, although he had reformist leanings. Henry VIII, possibly influenced by the Seymours, supporters of Protestantism, believed that Norfolk and Surrey were going to usurp the Crown from his son, the future Edward VI, to reverse the Reformation and thus return the English Church to papal jurisdiction. Norfolk's family, including his estranged wife, his daughter Mary, and his mistress, Elizabeth Holland, all gave evidence against him. His son was convicted of treason and executed on 19 January 1547, and on 27 January 1547, the Howards, father and son, were attainted by statute. The dying King gave his assent to the Duke's death through royal commissioners, and it was rumoured that he would be executed on the following day. Norfolk was saved by the King's death, in the early morning of 28 January, and the council's decision not to inaugurate the new reign with bloodshed, but remained a prisoner in the Tower of London. His estates fell prey to the ruling clique in the reign of Edward VI, for which he was later partly compensated by lands worth £1,626 a year from the Catholic Queen Mary I.

Duke of Norfolk's Restitution Act 1553
- Act of Parliament
- Parliament of England
- Long title: An act declaring the attainder of the duke of Norfolk.
- Citation: 1 Mar. Sess. 2. c. 13 Pr.
- Territorial extent: England and Wales

Dates
- Royal assent: 5 December 1553
- Commencement: 24 October 1553 (Note: Start of session.)
Other legislation
Repeals/revokes	Attainder of Duke of Norfolk and Earl of Surrey Act 1546
Relates to	Restitution in blood of Thomas Howard, Earl of Surrey.; Creation of Duke of Suffolk Act 1513

Status: Current legislation

Howard remained in the Tower throughout the reign of Edward VI, being released and pardoned along with the Bishop of Winchester Stephen Gardiner, after the accession of Mary in July 1553. He was appointed to the Privy Council, and presided as Lord High Steward at the trial of the Duke of Northumberland on 18 August. He was also restored to the office of Earl Marshal and officiated in that capacity at Mary's coronation on 1 October 1553. In Mary's first parliament (October–December of that year), Howard's attainder was declared void, thereby restoring him to the dukedom and its subsidiary titles. Because Norfolk's son Henry Howard was dead, the courtesy title of Earl of Surrey, which had been left vacant since the execution of Henry six years earlier, devolved upon Henry Howard's eldest son Thomas, who was now the Duke's heir-apparent.

Shortly after his release, Howard took over the care of his five grandchildren, the Earl of Surrey's children, who up to that time had been under the tutelage of John Foxe (Author of ' Foxe's Book of Martyrs). Howard dismissed him (Foxe soon went into exile to various countries in continental Europe to escape anti-Protestant measures taken by Queen Mary). Shortly after dismissing Foxe, Howard reassigned the education of his grandson and heir Thomas, to Bishop Gardiner, now Lord Chancellor to Queen Mary. Shortly afterwards, however, the Duke once again reassigned the education of his heir, and that of his other grandson Henry, this time to the Catholic priest John White who was soon elected to be Bishop of Lincoln.

In late 1553, Howard arranged for a marriage between Thomas and Mary FitzAlan, one of the daughters of the Earl of Arundel, with the aim of uniting the two most prominent Catholic families in England. In early 1554 the elderly Norfolk carried out his last service to the Crown by leading some of the forces which put down Wyatt's Rebellion, a group of disaffected Protestant gentlemen who opposed the Queen's projected marriage to Philip II of Spain.

== Death and burial ==
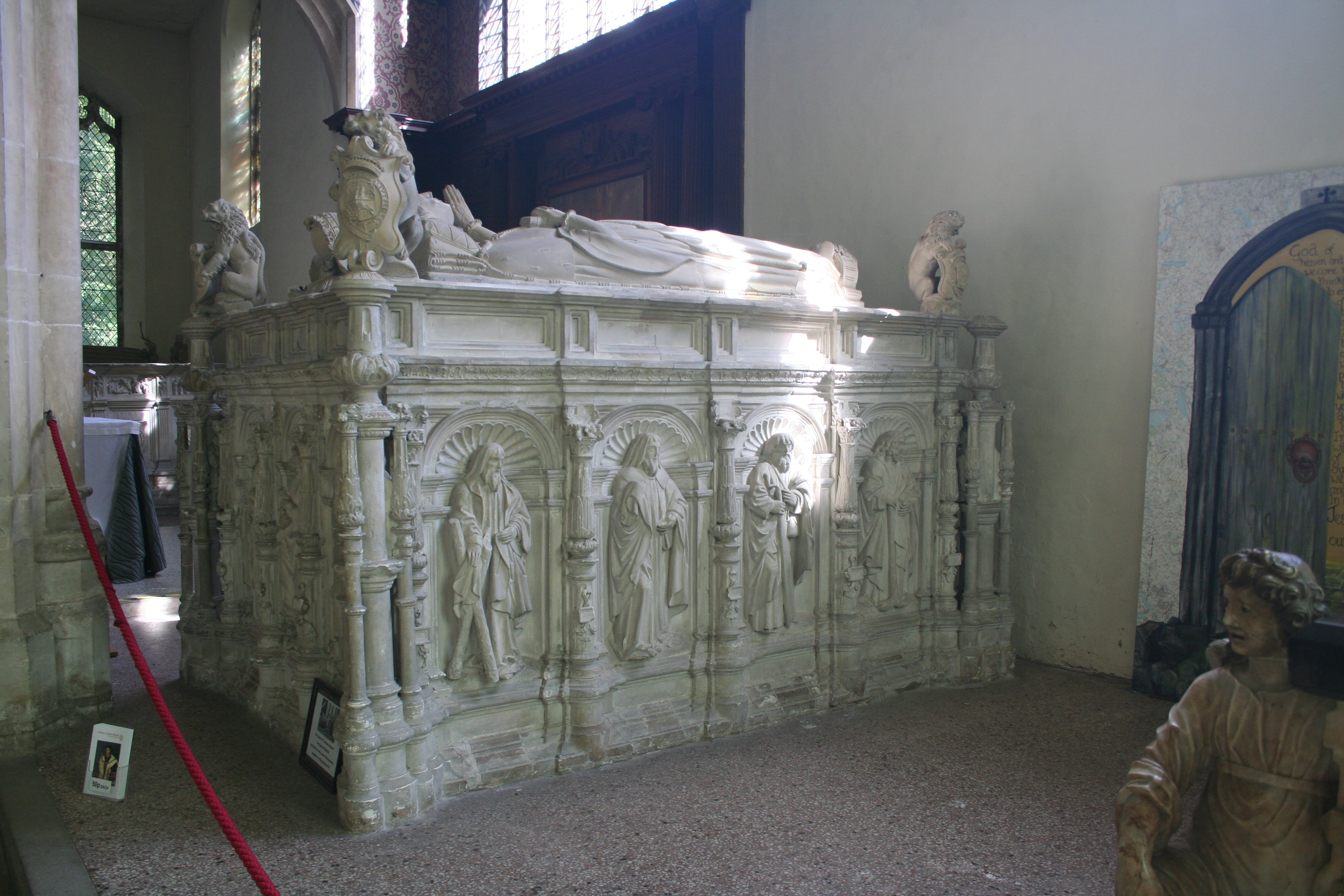
Tomb of Thomas Howard, 3rd Duke of Norfolk and Anne of York in the Church of St Michael the Archangel, Framlingham

The Duke died at his Kenninghall residence on 25 August 1554 after several weeks in which his health gradually declined. Norfolk was buried in the Church of St Michael the Archangel, Framlingham, Suffolk, where his spectacular tomb, richly decorated with religious iconography and with heraldic lions that hold the coats of arms of both the Howard family and the House of York, because Anne of York, the Duke's first wife, was buried in the same tomb.

The religious representations on Howard's tomb are of the twelve Apostles and some of the oldest Christian saints. On the south side are St Matthew the Evangelist, St James the Great, St James the Less and St Andrew; on the west St Peter, the Prophet Aaron and St Paul; on the north St Matthias, St Jude Thaddeus, Simon the Zealot (also known as Simon the Canaanite) and St Philip; and on the east St John the Evangelist, Simeon of Jerusalem and St Thomas.

Parts of the tomb are believed to be parts of the 2nd Duke's tomb, which was located at Thetford and was destroyed when the Priory was closed. The remains of two other men in the tomb are likely the first and second Dukes.

The effigy of Howard is to the left of that of his first wife, rather than the usual right, due to the latter's royal lineage. He was succeeded as Duke and as Earl Marshal by his grandson, Thomas Howard, 4th Duke of Norfolk.

== Marriage and progeny ==
Thomas Howard married twice:

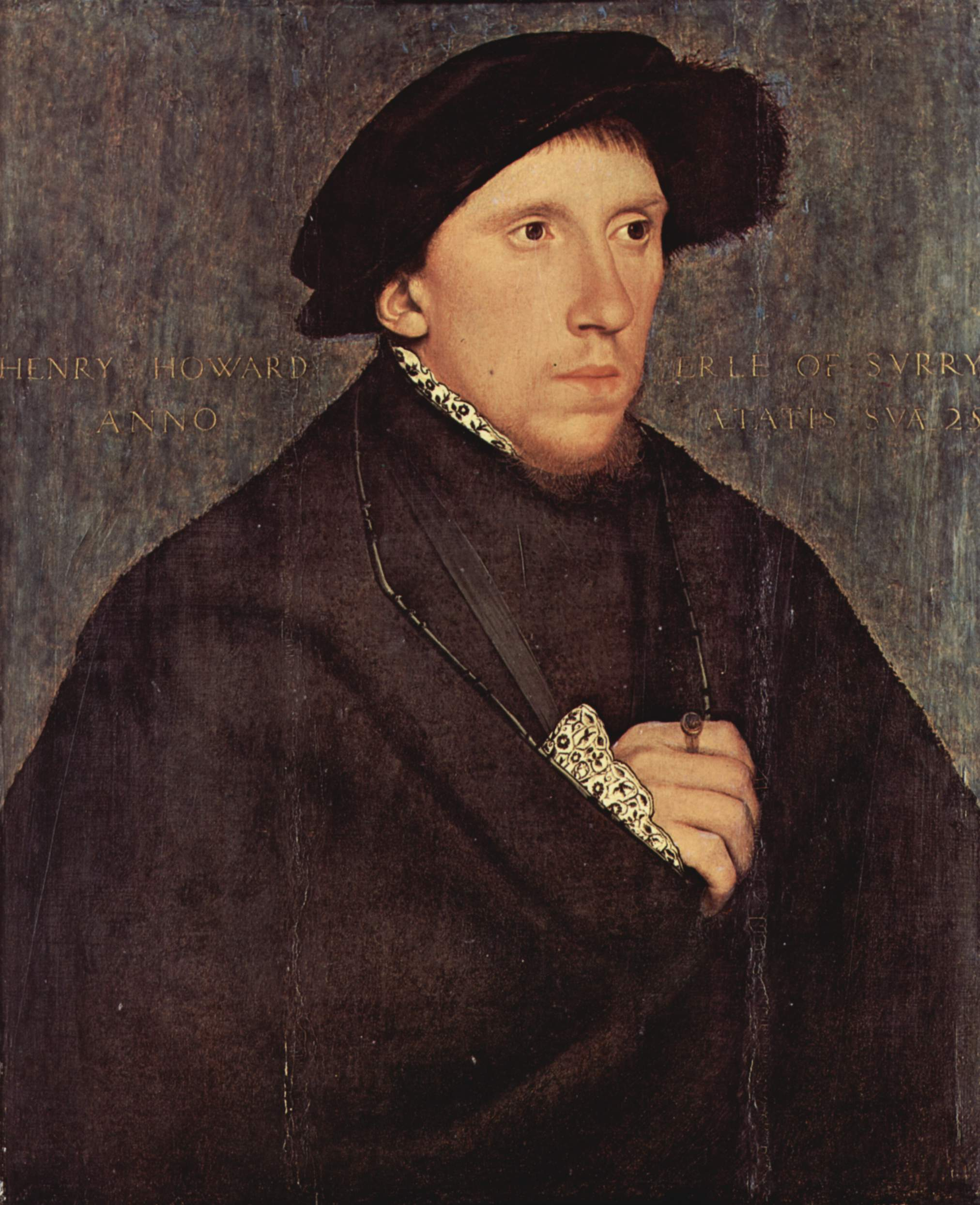
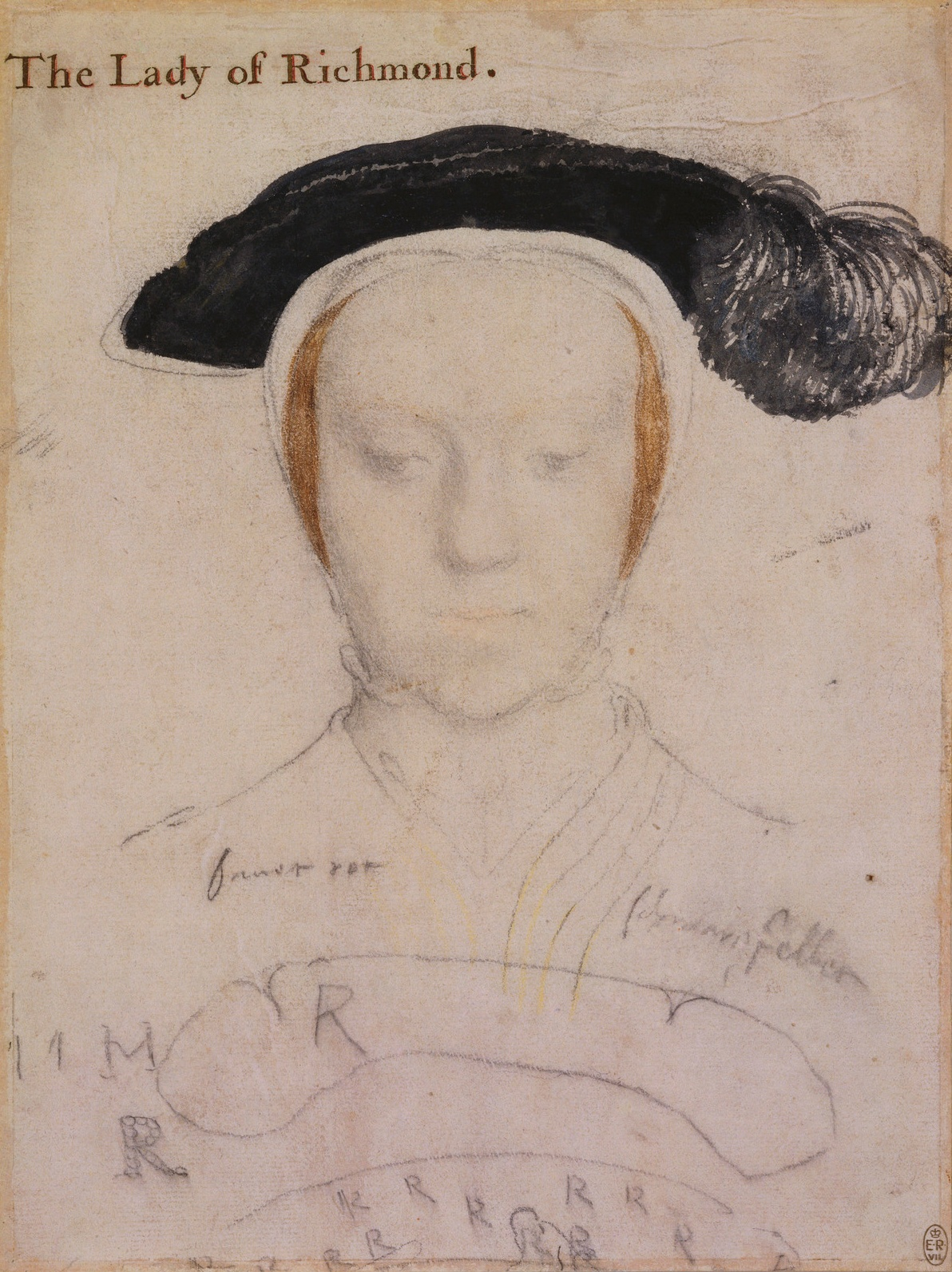
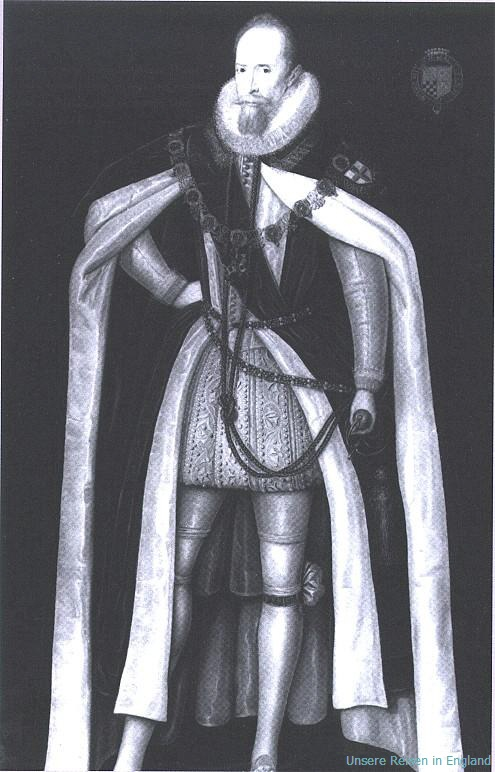
Henry, Mary and Thomas, children of Norfolk and Elizabeth Stafford

First he married the Princess Anne of York (1475–1511), the fifth daughter of King Edward IV of England and Elizabeth Woodville, and the sister-in-law of King Henry VII. Anne had previously been betrothed to the Habsburg prince Philip the Handsome, son of the Archduke Maximilian of Austria, later Holy Roman Emperor, but the marriage negotiations were cancelled in 1483, after the death of Edward IV. Thomas and the Princess were distantly related, as both were descendants of King Edward I. Howard was descended from Thomas of Brotherton, the fourth son of Edward I, while Anne was descended from King Edward II, Brotherton's half-brother. Arrangements for the marriage between the Princess and Thomas began in March 1484, shortly after she and her six sisters were reinstated at the court of their uncle, Richard III, by an agreement between the King and his sister-in-law, and mother of the girls, the Dowager Queen Elizabeth. The monarch, at that time, promised that his nieces would not be imprisoned in the Tower or any other prison and that they would be placed "in respectable places of good name and reputation", and later be married to "men of noble birth" and given dowry lands with an annual income of 200 marks each.

Shortly after the deal was sealed and the princesses arrived at court, the King began searching for suitable husbands for his nieces: for Anne he chose Thomas Howard. By choosing the son and heir of the Earl of Surrey and second-in-line to the Dukedom of Norfolk, he showed his favour to the Howard family. This was a politically advantageous match on both sides. The following year, in 1485, and when Anne and Thomas were still children, Richard III and the Earl of Surrey agreed to the marriage contract, but the King did not have time to formalize the marriage due to the invasion from Wales of the Lancastrian claimant to the throne, Henry Tudor, and then marriage negotiations were suspended following the monarch's death at the Battle of Bosworth. A few years later, Elizabeth of York, eldest sister of the Princess and now wife of the new King Henry VII, resumed negotiations for Anne to marry Thomas. The princess and her future husband had known each other since childhood as both Howard's father and grandfather served at the court of Edward IV. The queen took into account the opinion of her sister and considered that the Howard family were noble enough to qualify for a high marriage, and therefore on 4 February 1495 (according to other sources in 1494) the wedding of Anne and Thomas Howard was celebrated. The wedding took place in Westminster Abbey, and the marriage celebrations took place at the Palace of Placentia. The royal family attended the wedding, and the king also attended a festive mass, but the dowry of 10,000 marks, assigned to Anne by her father was not received by the newlyweds. By order of the queen, the couple were assigned annuity payments in the amount of £120 per year, which were to be made throughout Anne's life or until the death of her mother-in-law: this amount included provision for the maintenance of Anne herself, as well as her servants and seven horses. This pension was granted because the queen did not want to leave Anne dependent on her husband, who due to his circumstances, could not provide the princess with a comfortable existence suitable to her royal rank.

Since the groom's father had received only part of the family estate following the Battle of Bosworth, and this had no residence suitable for a woman of royal blood, the newlyweds received the right to use the estates located in the possessions of the Duke of York and the Marquess of Dorset, Anne's nephew and half-brother respectively. In return, the queen required that in the event of the death of Howard's father the Earl of Surrey or his wife (a wealthy heiress), Anne's interests should be taken into account on an equal basis with the interests of her husband. The king allocated his new sister-in-law another £26 per year from Crown lands. By Anne, he had four children, none of whom survived to adulthood. Anne died in November 1511, being buried in the first instance in Thetford Priory, then the burial place and mausoleum of members of the Howard family. When the Priory was closed during the Reformation, her remains were moved to St Michael the Archangel's Church, Framlingham, Suffolk.

His second marriage, early in 1513, was to Lady Elizabeth Stafford, daughter of Edward Stafford, 3rd Duke of Buckingham, by his wife Eleanor Percy, daughter of Henry Percy, 4th Earl of Northumberland. Through her paternal grandmother, Catherine Woodville, Elizabeth was a cousin of Howard's first wife. By Elizabeth, he had five children:

  - Henry Howard (1516/7–1547), who used the courtesy title of Earl of Surrey when his father became 3rd Duke of Norfolk in 1524. In 1532/3 he married Lady Frances de Vere, daughter of John de Vere, 15th Earl of Oxford, by whom he had two sons and three daughters: Thomas Howard, 4th Duke of Norfolk; Henry Howard, 1st Earl of Northampton; Catherine Howard, who married Henry Berkeley, 7th Baron Berkeley; Margaret Howard, who married Henry Scrope, 9th Baron Scrope of Bolton; and Jane Howard, who married Charles Neville, 6th Earl of Westmorland.
  - Catherine Howard (1518–1530), who by 9 December 1529 married Edward Stanley, 3rd Earl of Derby (1509–1572). After Catherine's death in March 1530, Derby married a second time to Dorothy Howard, his first wife's aunt.
  - Mary Howard (1519–1557), who married, on 28 November 1533, King Henry VIII's illegitimate son, Henry FitzRoy (1519–1536), by whom she had no issue. The marriage was never consummated due to FitzRoy's death a few years later.
  - Thomas Howard, 1st Viscount Howard of Bindon (1520–1582), who married firstly Elizabeth Marney, secondly Gertrude Lyte, thirdly Mabel Burton, and fourthly Margaret Manning.
  - Muriel Howard (1521–). Died young

As dowager duchess, Elizabeth survived a few years after her husband's death, dying in November 1558. She was buried in the Church of St Mary-at-Lambeth, Surrey.

== Fictional portrayals ==
=== Shakespeare ===
- Henry VIII by William Shakespeare and John Fletcher(1613); Thomas Howard appears as the Earl of Surrey whilst his father appears as the Duke of Norfolk. The playwrights conflate the actual dates of father and son so that both may appear as important characters in the play.

=== Books ===
Norfolk is an important character in:

- The Philippa Gregory novels The Other Boleyn Girl and The Boleyn Inheritance
- The Man on a Donkey by H.F.M. Prescott
- The Fifth Queen by Ford Madox Ford
- Hilary Mantel's Wolf Hall, Bring Up the Bodies, and The Mirror & the Light

=== Films and television ===
- In The Private Life of Henry VIII (1933) he was played by Frederick Culley.
- In The Prince and the Pauper (1937) he was played by Henry Stephenson.
- In A Man for All Seasons (1966), he was played by Nigel Davenport.
- In Anne of the Thousand Days (1969), Peter Jeffrey took the role. He went on to reprise the role in a 1996 BBC adaptation of Mark Twain's 1881 novel The Prince and the Pauper.
- In the 1970 BBC TV series The Six Wives of Henry VIII, the role was played by Patrick Troughton.
- In the 1972 film The Six Wives of Henry VIII, based on the TV series, he was played by Michael Gough.
- Sir Rex Harrison portrayed him in the 1977 adaptation of the Mark Twain novel, The Prince and the Pauper.
- Mark Strong portrayed Norfolk in the 2003 ITV feature Henry VIII.
- In the 2003 BBC adaptation of The Other Boleyn Girl, he was played by John Woodvine.
- In the Showtime series The Tudors (2007), he was played by Henry Czerny.
- David Morrissey played the Duke in the 2008 film The Other Boleyn Girl.
- Bernard Hill played the Duke in the 2015 BBC adaptation of Hilary Mantel's Wolf Hall. Timothy Spall plays him in the second series, Wolf Hall: The Mirror and the Light.
- Peter Firth played Norfolk, in the 2024 series Shardlake, an adaptation of the series of books of the same name by C. J. Sansom.

== Family tree ==
Family tree of the Dukes of Norfolk and Suke of Surrey; Earls of Arundel, East Anglia, Norfolk, Norwich, Nottingham, and Surrey; and Barons Mowbray, Segrave and Stourton

Earl of East Anglia (Earls of Norfolk and Suffolk) (1st creation), a. 1069
Ralph the Staller c. 1011–1068; 1st Earl of Norfolk and Suffolk, or of the East Angles (Earl c. 1066/67 – 1068)
Earl of Surrey (1st creation), c. 1088
Ralph de Gael a. 1040–1100; 2nd Earl of Norfolk and Suffolk, or of the East Angles (Earl 1068–1074)	Roger Bigod (Bigot) d. 1107; Sheriff of Norfolk and Suffolk	William de Warenne c. 1035–1088; 1st Earl (of) Warenne / Earl of Surrey, Lord of Lewes, Seigneur de Varennes
Earldom forfeit, 1074
Earl of Norfolk (2nd creation), 1141
King Henry I c. 1068–1135	Maud Bigod	William Bigod d. 1120	Hugh Bigod; 1095–1177; 1st Earl of Norfolk (Earl 1141–1177)	William de Warenne d. 1138; 2nd Earl (of) Warenne / Earl of Surrey
Earl of Arundel, Earl of Sussex (1st creations), c. 1138
Empress Matilda c. 1102–1167	Geoffrey Plantagenet; 1113–1251; Count of Anjou	Adeliza of Louvain c. 1103–1151	William d'Aubigny c. 1109–1176; 1st Earl of Arundel (Sussex), Earl of Lincoln	William de Warenne; 1119–1148; 3rd Earl of Surrey
King Henry II; 1133–1189	William d'Aubigny b. c. 1138/1150–1176; 2nd Earl of Arundel (Sussex)	Roger Bigod c. 1144/1150–1221; 2nd Earl of Norfolk (Earl 1189–1221, disputed 1177–1189)	William of Blois c. 1137–1159	Isabel de Warenne c. 1130 – 1203; 4th Countess of Surrey suo jure	Hamelin de Warenne c. 1130–1202; Comte de Warenne / Earl of Surrey, jure uxoris
King John; 1166/1167–1216	William d'Aubigny a. 1180–1221; 3rd Earl of Arundel (Sussex)	Hugh Bigod; 1186–1225; 3rd Earl of Norfolk (Earl 1221–1225)	Maud Marshal; 1192–1248	William de Warenne c. 1160s/1170s–1240 5th Earl of Surrey
William d'Aubigny c. 1203–a. 1124; 4th Earl of Arundel (Sussex)	Hugh d'Aubigny d. 1243; 5th Earl of Arundel (Sussex)	Isabel d'Aubigny	John Fitzalan; 1200–1240; Lord of Clun and Oswestry	Roger Bigod c. 1209–1270; 4th Earl of Norfolk (Earl 1233–1270)	Hugh Bigod c. 1211–1266
Earl of Sussex (1st creation), 1282
King Henry III; 1207–1272	John Fitzalan; 1223–1267; 6th Earl of Arundel (Sussex), jure matris	John de Warenne; 1231–1304; 1st Earl of Sussex (Earl of Sussex 1282–1304), 6th Earl of Surrey (Earl of Surrey 1240–1304)
Baron Segrave of Se(a)grave, 1283
Nicholas Segrave c. 1238–a. 1295; 1st Baron Segrave	King Edward I 1239–1307	Edmund Crouchback; 1245–1296; Earl of Lancaster	John Fitzalan; 1246–1272; 7th Earl of Arundel (Sussex), jure matris	Roger Bigod c. 1245–1306; 5th Earl of Norfolk (Earl 1270–1306)
Earldom extinct, 1270
Baron Mowbray, 1283	Earl of Arundel (2nd (1st by writ) creation), 1289
John Segrave c. 1256–1325; 2nd Baron Segrave	Roger de Mowbray; 1254–1297; 1st Baron Mowbray	Richard Fitzalan; 1267–1302; 1st (or 6th) Earl of Arundel	William de Warenne; 1256–1286
Earl of Norfolk (3rd creation), 1312
Stephen Segrave d. 1325; 3rd Baron Segrave	Thomas of Brotherton; 1300–1338; 1st Earl of Norfolk (Earl 1312–1338)	John Mowbray; 1286–1322; 2nd Baron Mowbray	Henry c. 1281–1345; Earl of Leicester, Earl of Lancaster	Edmund Fitzalan; 1286–1326; 2nd (or 7th) Earl of Arundel	Alice de Warenne; 1287–1388 heir apparent to the Earldom of Surrey	John de Warenne; 1286–1347; 7th Earl of Surrey, 2nd Earl of Sussex
Earldom of Arundel (2nd creation) forfeit, 1326	Earldom of Sussex extinct(?), 1347
Earldom of Arundel (2nd creation) restored, 1331
John Segrave; 1315–1353; 4th Baron Segrave	Margaret of Brotherton; 1320–1399; Duchess of Norfolk "for life" (Duchess 1397–1399), 2nd Countess of Norfolk (Countess 1338–1399),	John Mowbray; 1310–1361; 3rd Baron Mowbray	Joan of Lancaster c. 1312–1349	Eleanor of Lancaster; 1318–1372	Richard FitzAlan c. 1313–1376; 3rd (or 8th) Earl of Arundel (Earl of Arundel 1331–1376), 8th Earl of Surrey (Earl of Surrey 1347–1376)
Baron Arundel, 1377
Elizabeth de Segrave; 1338–1368; 5th Baroness Segrave	John de Mowbray; 1340–1368; 4th Baron Mowbray	Richard FitzAlan; 1346–1397; 4th (or 9th) Earl of Arundel, 9th Earl of Surrey	John FitzAlan c. 1348–1379; 1st Baron Arundel	Alice FitzAlan
Earldom of Arundel (2nd creation) forfeit, 1397
Earl of Nottingham (1st creation), 1377	Earl of Nottingham (2nd creation), 1383; Duke of Norfolk (1st creation), 1397	Duke of Surrey, 1397
John de Mowbray; 1365–1383; Earl of Nottingham (Earl 1377–1383), 6th Baron Segrave, 5th Baron Mowbray (Baron 1368–1383)	Thomas de Mowbray; 1366–1399; 1st Duke of Norfolk, etc. (Duke 1397–1399), 3rd Earl of Norfolk (Earl 1399), 7th Baron Segrave, 6th Baron Mowbray (Baron 1377–1399)	Elizabeth Fitzalan; 1366–1425	John FitzAlan; 1364–1390; 2nd Baron Arundel	Thomas Holland; 1372–1400; Duke of Surrey, Earl of Kent, Baron Holland
Earldom of Nottingham extinct, 1383	Titles forfeit, 1399	Dukedom of Surrey renounced, 1400
Baron Stourton, 1448	Duke of Norfolk (1st creation restored), 1425	Earldom of Arundel (2nd creation) restored, 1400
John Stourton; 1400–1462; 1st Baron Stourton (Baron 1448–1462)	Thomas de Mowbray; 1385–1405; 4th Earl of Norfolk, 8th Baron Segrave, 7th Baron Mowbray (Earl 1399–1405)	John de Mowbray; 1392–1432; 2nd Duke of Norfolk (Duke 1425–1432), 5th Earl of Norfolk, 9th Baron Segrave, 8th Baron Mowbray (Earl 1405–1432)	Margaret de Mowbray c. 1388–1459	Robert Howard; 1385–1436	Isabel de Mowbray c. 1400–1452	Thomas FitzAlan; 1381–1415; 5th (or 10th) Earl of Arundel, 10th Earl of Surrey	John Fitzalan; 1385–1421; 6th (or 11th) Earl of Arundel, 3rd Baron Arundel, 3rd Baron Maltravers
Duke of Norfolk (4th creation), 1483
William Stourton a. 1426–1478; 2nd Baron Stourton (Baron 1462–1478)	John de Mowbray; 1415–1461; 3rd Duke of Norfolk, 6th Earl of Norfolk, 10th Baron Segrave, 9th Baron Mowbray (Duke 1432–1461)	John Howard; 1425–1485; 1st Duke of Norfolk, 13th Baron Segrave, 12th Baron Mowbray (Duke 1483–1485)	John Fitzalan; 1408–1435; 7th (or 12th) Earl of Arundel, 4th Baron Arundel, 4th Baron Maltravers	William Fitzalan; 1417–1487; 9th (or 14th) Earl of Arundel, 6th Baron Arundel, 6th Baron Maltravers
Titles forfeit, 1485
Earl of Surrey (2nd creation), 1451	Duke of Norfolk (4th creation) restored and Earl of Surrey, 1514
John Stourton c. 1454–1485; 3rd Baron Stourton (Baron 1479–1485)	William Stourton c. 1457–1524; 5th Baron Stourton (Baron 1487–1524)	John de Mowbray; 1444–1476; 4th Duke of Norfolk, 7th Earl of Norfolk, 11th Baron Segrave, 10th Baron Mowbray (Duke 1461–1476), Earl of Surrey (Earl 1451–1476)	King Edward IV; 1442–1483	Thomas Howard; 1443–1524; 2nd Duke of Norfolk, 1st Earl of Surrey (Duke 1514–1524)	Humfrey Fitzalan; 1429–1438; 8th (or 13th) Earl of Arundel, 5th Baron Arundel, 5th Baron Maltravers	Thomas Fitzalan; 1450–1524; 10th (or 15th) Earl of Arundel, 7th Baron Arundel, 7th Baron Maltravers
Dukedom of Norfolk, Earldom of Nottingham, Earldom of Surrey extinct, 1476
Duke of Norfolk (3rd creation), Earl of Nottingham (3rd creation), and Earl of Surrey, 1477
Francis Stourton; 1485–1487; 4th Baron Stourton (Baron 1485–1487)	Edward Stourton; 1463–1535; 6th Baron Stourton (Baron 1524–1535)	Anne de Mowbray; 1472–1481; 8th Countess of Norfolk, 12th Baroness Segrave, 11th Baroness Mowbray (Countess 1476–1481)	Richard of Shrewsbury; 1473–1483; Duke of York, Duke of Norfolk, Earl of Nottingham, Earl of Warenne (Duke 1477–1483)	Anne of York; 1475–1511	Thomas Howard; 1473–1554; 3rd Duke of Norfolk, 2nd Earl of Surrey (Duke 1524–1554)	Edmund Howard c. 1478–1539	Elizabeth Boleyn c. 1480–1538	William Fitzalan; 1476–1544; 11th (or 16th) Earl of Arundel, 8th Baron Arundel, 8th Baron Maltravers
Earldom of Norfolk extinct and Baronies Segrave and Mowbray in abeyance, 1481	Dukedom of Norfolk, Earldom of Nottingham, Earldom of Surrey extinct, 1483	Attainted, 1547; Restored, 1553
William Stourton c. 1505–1548; 7th Baron Stourton	Earl of Nottingham (5th creation), 1525	King Henry VIII; 1491–1547	Anne Boleyn c. 1501 or 1507–1536
Viscount Howard of Bindon, 1559
Charles Stourton c. 1520–1557; 8th Baron Stourton	Henry Howard; 1517–1547 styled Earl of Surrey	Thomas Howard c. 1520–1582; 1st Viscount Howard of Bindon	Mary FitzRoy; 1519–1557	Henry FitzRoy; 1519–1536; Duke of Richmond and Somerset, Earl of Nottingham	Catherine Howard c. 1524–1542	Henry Fitzalan; 1512–1580; 12th (or 17th) Earl of Arundel, 9th Baron Arundel, 9th Baron Maltravers
Earldom of Nottingham extinct, 1536
Thomas Howard; 1536–1572; 4th Duke of Norfolk, 3rd Earl of Surrey, 13th Baron Mowbray (Duke 1554–1572)	Henry Howard; 1540–1614; Earl of Northampton	Queen Elizabeth I 1533–1603	Mary FitzAlan; 1540–1557
Dukedom (3rd creation) forfeit, 1572
Earl of Arundel (3rd creation), 1580	Earl of Suffolk (4th creation), 1603
John Stourton; 1553–1588; 9th Baron Stourton	Edward Stourton c. 1555–1633; 10th Baron Stourton	Philip Howard; 1557–1595; 20th/13th/1st Earl of Arundel, styled Earl of Surrey	Thomas Howard; 1561–1626; Earl of Suffolk	Lord William Howard; 1563–1640
Earldom of Arundel and Barony of Mowbray attainted, 1589	see Earls, Marquesses, and Dukes of Suffolk family tree
Earl of Arundel (3rd creation) and Barony of Mowbray restored, 1604; Earl of Norfolk (5th creation), 1644
William Stourton c. 1594–1672; 11th Baron Stourton	Thomas Howard; 1585–1646; 21st/14th/2nd Earl of Arundel, 2nd/4th Earl of Surrey, 1st Earl of Norfolk, 14th Baron Mowbray (Earl 1644–1646)	Philip
see Earls of Shrewsbury family tree
Edward Stourton; 1617–1644	Alethea Talbot; 1585–1654; 17th Baroness Strange of Blackmere, 14th Baroness Talbot, 13th Baroness Furnivall	Henry Frederick Howard; 1608–1652; 22nd/15th/3rd Earl of Arundel, 3rd/5th Earl of Surrey, 2nd Earl of Norfolk, 15th Baron Mowbray (Earl 1646–1652)	William Howard; 1614–1680; Viscount Stafford	William
Duke of Norfolk (4th creation restored), 1660	Baron Howard of Castle Rising, 1669; Earl of Norwich (3rd creation), 1672
William Stourton d. 1685; 12th Baron Stourton	Thomas Howard; 1627–1677; 5th Duke of Norfolk, 21st/14th/2nd Earl of Arundel, 4th/6th Earl of Surrey, 16th Baron Mowbray (Duke 1660–1677) 18th Baron Strange of Blackmere, 15th Baron Talbot, 14th Baron Furnivall (Baron 1654–1677)	Henry Howard; 1628–1684; 6th Duke of Norfolk, 22nd/15th/3rd Earl of Arundel, 5th/7th Earl of Surrey; 18th Baron Strange of Blackmere, 17th Baron Mowbray, 15th Baron Talbot, 14th Baron Furnivall (Duke 1677–1684) 1st Earl of Norwich, etc. (Earl 1672–1684)	Charles Howard; 1630–1713	Col. Bernard Howard; 1641–1717	Charles Howard; 1628–1685; Earl of Carlisle
Edward Stourton; 1665–1720; 13th Baron Stourton	Thomas Stourton; 1667–1744; 14th Baron Stourton	Charles Stourton; 1669–1739	Henry Howard; 1655–1701; 7th Duke of Norfolk, 22nd/15th/3rd Earl of Arundel, 5th/7th Earl of Surrey, 2nd Earl of Norwich, etc. 18th Baron Mowbray, 19th Baron Strange of Blackmere, 15th Baron Talbot, 14th Baron Furnivall (Duke 1684–1701)	Lord Thomas Howard; 1662–1689	Henry Charles Howard d. 1720
Thomas Howard; 1683–1732; 8th Duke of Norfolk, 23rd/16th/4th Earl of Arundel, 6th/8th Earl of Surrey, 3rd Earl of Norwich, etc. 18th Baron Strange of Blackmere, 15th Baron Talbot, 14th Baron Furnivall, 19th Baron Mowbray (Duke 1701–1732)	Edward Howard; 1685–1777; 9th Duke of Norfolk, 24th/17th/5th Earl of Arundel, 7th/9th Earl of Surrey, 4th Earl of Norwich, etc. 20th Baron Mowbray, 20th Baron Strange of Blackmere, 15th Baron Talbot, 14th Baron Furnivall (Duke 1732–1777)	Philip Howard; 1688–1750	Bernard Howard; 1674–1735
Earldom of Norwich (3rd creation) and Barony of Howard of Castle Rising extinct and Baronies of Furnivall, Mowbray, Segrave, Strange of Blackmere, and Talbot abeyant, 1777
Charles Stourton; 1702–1753; 15th Baron Stourton	William Stourton; 1704–1781; 16th Baron Stourton	Winifred Howard; 1726–1753	Anne Howard; 1742–1787	Charles Howard; 1720–1786; 10th Duke of Norfolk, 25th/18th/6th Earl of Arundel, 8th/10th Earl of Surrey (Duke 1777–1786)	Henry Howard; 1713–1787
Charles Philip Stourton; 1752–1816; 17th Baron Stourton	Charles Howard; 1746–1815; 11th Duke of Norfolk, 26th/19th/7th Earl of Arundel, 9th/11th Earl of Surrey (Duke 1786–1815)
William Stourton; 1776–1846; 18th Baron Stourton	Bernard Howard; 1765–1842; 12th Duke of Norfolk, 27th/20th/8th Earl of Arundel, 10th/12th Earl of Surrey (Duke 1815–1842)	Henry Howard-Molyneux-Howard; 1766–1824
Charles Stourton; 1802–1872; 19th Baron Stourton	Henry Howard; 1791–1856; 13th Duke of Norfolk, 28th/21st/9th Earl of Arundel, 11th/13th Earl of Surrey (Duke 1842–1856)	Henry Howard-Molyneux-Howard; 1802–1875
Baron Mowbray and Baron Segrave abeayance restored, 1878	Baron Howard of Glossop, 1869
Alfred Joseph Stourton; 1829–1893; 24th Baron Segrave, 21st/23rd Baron Mowbray, 20th Baron Stourton	Henry Granville Fitzalan-Howard; 1815–1860; 14th Duke of Norfolk, 29th/22nd/10th Earl of Arundel, 12th/14th Earl of Surrey (Duke 1856–1860)	Edward George Fitzalan-Howard; 1818–1883; 1st Baron Howard of Glossop
Baron Howard of Penrith, 1830
Charles Botolph Joseph Stourton; 1867–1936; 25th Baron Segrave, 22nd/24th Baron Mowbray, 21st Baron Stourton	Henry Fitzalan-Howard; 1847–1917; 15th Duke of Norfolk, 30th/23rd/11th Earl of Arundel, 13th/15th Earl of Surrey, Lord Maltravers, Earl of Arundel and Surrey (Duke 1860–1917)	Francis Fitzalan-Howard; 1859–1924; 2nd Baron Howard of Glossop	Esmé Howard; 1863–1939; 1st Baron Howard of Penrith
William Marmaduke Stourton; 1895–1965; 26th Baron Segrave, 23rd/25th Baron Mowbray, 22nd Baron Stourton	Bernard Fitzalan-Howard; 1908–1975; 16th Duke of Norfolk, 31st/24th/12th Earl of Arundel, 14th/16th Earl of Surrey (Duke 1917–1975)	Bernard Edward Fitzalan-Howard; 1885–1972; 3rd Baron Howard of Glossop	Francis Howard; 1905–1999; 2nd Baron Howard of Penrith
Charles Edward Stourton; 1923–2006; 27th Baron Segrave, 24th/26th Baron Mowbray, 23rd Baron Stourton	Miles Fitzalan-Howard; 1915–2002; 17th Duke of Norfolk, 32nd/25th/13th Earl of Arundel, 15th/17th Earl of Surrey, 4th Baron Howard of Glossop (Duke 1975–2002) m. Mary Teresa Constable-Maxwell
Edward William Stephen Stourton; 1953–2021; 28th Baron Segrave, 25th/27th Baron Mowbray, 24th Baron Stourton	Marsha Howard b. 1953	Edward Fitzalan-Howard b. 1956; 18th Duke of Norfolk, 33rd/26th/14th Earl of Arundel, 16th/18th Earl of Surrey, 5th Baron Howard of Glossop (from 2002) m. Georgina Susan Gore	Philip Esmé Howard b. 1945; 3rd Baron Howard of Penrith
Sarah Louise Stourton b. 1982	Isabella Laura Stourton b. 1983	Camilla Charlotte Stourton b. 1987	Francesca Jane Stourton b. 1988	James Charles Peter Stourton b. 1991; 29th Baron Segrave, 26th/28th Baron Mowbray, 25th Baron Stourton	Henry Fitzalan-Howard b. 1987 styled Earl of Arundel and Surrey	Thomas Philip Howard b. 1974
Co-heir presumptive to the Baronies Segrave, Mowbray, and Stourton	Co-heir presumptive to the Baronies Segrave, Mowbray, and Stourton	Co-heir presumptive to the Baronies Segrave, Mowbray, and Stourton	Co-heir presumptive to the Baronies Segrave, Mowbray, and Stourton	Heir apparent to the dukedom	Heir apparent to the Barony Howard of Penrith

== Bibliography ==
- Angus, Caroline (2022). The Private Life of Thomas Cromwell. Yorkshire: Pen & Sword. ISBN 9781399095815.
- Archer, Ian W. (October 2006) [2004]. "Wyatt, Sir Thomas (b. in or before 1521, died 1554)". Oxford Dictionary of National Biography (online ed.). Oxford University Press. doi:10.1093/ref:odnb/30112. (Subscription, Wikipedia Library access or UK public library membership required.)
- Brigden, Susan (2008). "Howard, Henry, earl of Surrey (1516/17–1547), poet and soldier". Oxford Dictionary of National Biography (online ed.). Oxford University Press. doi:10.1093/ref:odnb/13905. (Subscription, Wikipedia Library access or UK public library membership required.)
- Chaney, Edward (1998). "Early Tudor tombs and the rise and fall of Anglo-Italian relations; Quo Vadis?". The Evolution of the Grand Tour. Psychology Press. ISBN 978-0-7146-4577-3.
- Chisholm, Hugh, ed. (1911). "Norfolk, Earls and Dukes of" . Encyclopædia Britannica. Vol. 19 (11th ed.). Cambridge University Press. pp. 742–744.
- Cokayne, G. E. (1926). H. A. Doubleday; Duncan Warrand; Lord Howard de Walden (eds.). The Complete Peerage, or a history of the House of Lords and all its members from the earliest times (Gordon to Hustpierpoint). Vol. 6 (2nd ed.). London: The St Catherine Press.
- Croft, Pauline (2004). "Howard, Henry, earl of Northampton (1540–1614)". Oxford Dictionary of National Biography (online ed.). Oxford University Press. doi:10.1093/ref:odnb/13906. (Subscription, Wikipedia Library access or UK public library membership required.)
- Everett Green, Mary Anne (1852). Lives of the Princesses of England. Vol. 3. London: Longman, Brown, Green, Longman and Robers.
- Great Britain. Record Commission (1834). State papers, published under the authority of His Majesty's Commission. Volume II. King Henry the Eighth part III. Correspondence between the Governments of England and Ireland 1515–1538.
- Graves, Michael A.R. (2004). "Howard (née Stafford), Elizabeth, duchess of Norfolk (1497–1558), noblewoman". Oxford Dictionary of National Biography (online ed.). Oxford University Press. doi:10.1093/ref:odnb/13897. (Subscription, Wikipedia Library access or UK public library membership required.)
- Graves, Michael A.R. (January 2008) [2004]. "Howard, Thomas, third duke of Norfolk (1473–1554)". Oxford Dictionary of National Biography (online ed.). Oxford University Press. doi:10.1093/ref:odnb/13940. (Subscription, Wikipedia Library access or UK public library membership required.)
- Graves, Michael A.R. (January 2008a). "Howard, Thomas, fourth duke of Norfolk (1538–1572), nobleman and courtier". Oxford Dictionary of National Biography (online ed.). Oxford University Press. doi:10.1093/ref:odnb/13941. (Subscription, Wikipedia Library access or UK public library membership required.)
- Harris, Barbara J. (2002). English Aristocratic Women, 1450–1550. Oxford: Oxford University Press.
- Head, David M. Ebbs & Flows of Fortune: The Life of Thomas Howard, Third Duke of Norfolk (University of Georgia Press, 1995) 360pp.
- Horrox, Rosemary (2006). "Edward IV (1442–1483), king of England and lord of Ireland". Oxford Dictionary of National Biography (online ed.). Oxford University Press. doi:10.1093/ref:odnb/8520. (Subscription, Wikipedia Library access or UK public library membership required.)
- Ives, E.W. (2004). "Anne (Anne Boleyn) (c. 1500–1536), queen of England, second consort of Henry VIII". Oxford Dictionary of National Biography (online ed.). Oxford University Press. doi:10.1093/ref:odnb/557. (Subscription, Wikipedia Library access or UK public library membership required.)
- Knafla, Louis A. (2008). "Stanley, Edward, third earl of Derby (1509–1572), magnate". Oxford Dictionary of National Biography (online ed.). Oxford University Press. doi:10.1093/ref:odnb/26262. (Subscription, Wikipedia Library access or UK public library membership required.)
- Leithead, Howard (2009). "Cromwell, Thomas, earl of Essex (b. in or before 1485, died 1540), royal minister". Oxford Dictionary of National Biography (online ed.). Oxford University Press. doi:10.1093/ref:odnb/6769. (Subscription, Wikipedia Library access or UK public library membership required.)
- MacCulloch, Diarmaid (2018). Thomas Cromwell: A Life. London: Allen Lane. ISBN 9780141967660.
- McDermott, James (2008). "Howard, William, first Baron Howard of Effingham (c.1510–1573), naval commander". Oxford Dictionary of National Biography (online ed.). Oxford University Press. doi:10.1093/ref:odnb/13946. (Subscription, Wikipedia Library access or UK public library membership required.)
- Panton, James (2011). Historical Dictionary of the British Monarchy. Scarecrow Press. ISBN 978-0-810-87497-8.
- Richardson, Douglas (2004). Everingham, Kimball G. (ed.). Plantagenet Ancestry: A Study in Colonial and Medieval Families. Baltimore, Maryland: Genealogical Publishing Company, Inc.
- Richardson, Douglas (2011). Everingham, Kimball G. (ed.). Magna Carta Ancestry: A Study in Colonial and Medieval Families. Vol. IV (2nd ed.). Salt Lake City, Utah. ISBN 978-1460992708.
- Ustinov, Vadim Georgievich (2015). Richard III. Moscow: Young Guard. ISBN 978-5-235-03852-3.
- Warnicke, Retha M. (2008). "Katherine (Catherine; née Katherine Howard) (1518x24–1542), queen of England and Ireland, fifth consort of Henry VIII". Oxford Dictionary of National Biography (online ed.). Oxford University Press. doi:10.1093/ref:odnb/4892. (Subscription, Wikipedia Library access or UK public library membership required.)
- Waugh, Scott L. (2004). "Thomas (Thomas of Brotherton), first earl of Norfolk (1300–1338), magnate". Oxford Dictionary of National Biography (online ed.). Oxford University Press. doi:10.1093/ref:odnb/27196. (Subscription, Wikipedia Library access or UK public library membership required.)
- Weir, Alison (1992). The six wives of Henry VIII. New York: Grove Weidenfeld. ISBN 0-8021-1497-0. OCLC 1036941209.
- Weir, Alison (2001a). Henry VIII, King and Court. Random House. ISBN 9780224060226.
- Weir, Alison (2011). Britain's Royal Families: The Complete Genealogy. Random House. ISBN 978-1-446-44911-0.
- Wood, Mary Anne Everett (1846). Letters of Royal and Illustrious Ladies of Great Britain. Vol. II. London: Henry Colburn. Archived from the original on 19 July 2023.

=== Attribution ===
- This article incorporates text from a publication now in the public domain: Creighton, Mandell (1891). "Howard, Thomas II (1473-1554)". In Lee, Sidney (ed.). Dictionary of National Biography. Vol. 28. London: Smith, Elder & Co. pp. 64–67.

Political offices
Preceded by Sir Edward Howard	Lord High Admiral; 1513–1525	Succeeded by The Duke of Richmond
Preceded by The Duke of Norfolk	Lord High Treasurer; 1522–1546	Succeeded by The Duke of Somerset
Preceded by The Duke of Suffolk	Earl Marshal; 1533–1547	Succeeded by The Duke of Somerset
Preceded by The Duke of Northumberland	Earl Marshal; 1553–1554	Succeeded by The Duke of Norfolk
Peerage of England
Preceded by Thomas Howard	Duke of Norfolk; 3rd creation 1524–1547; 1553–1554	Succeeded by Thomas Howard
Preceded by Thomas Howard	Earl of Surrey; 3rd creation 1514–1554	Succeeded by Thomas Howard
