= Hugh d'Aubigny, 5th Earl of Arundel =

Hugh d'Aubigny

5th Earl of Arundel
- Tenure: 1224–1243
- Predecessor: William d'Aubigny
- Successor: John FitzAlan
- Died: 7 May 1243
- Buried: Wymondham Abbey
- Spouse: Isabel de Warenne
- Father: William d'Aubigny
- Mother: Mabel of Chester

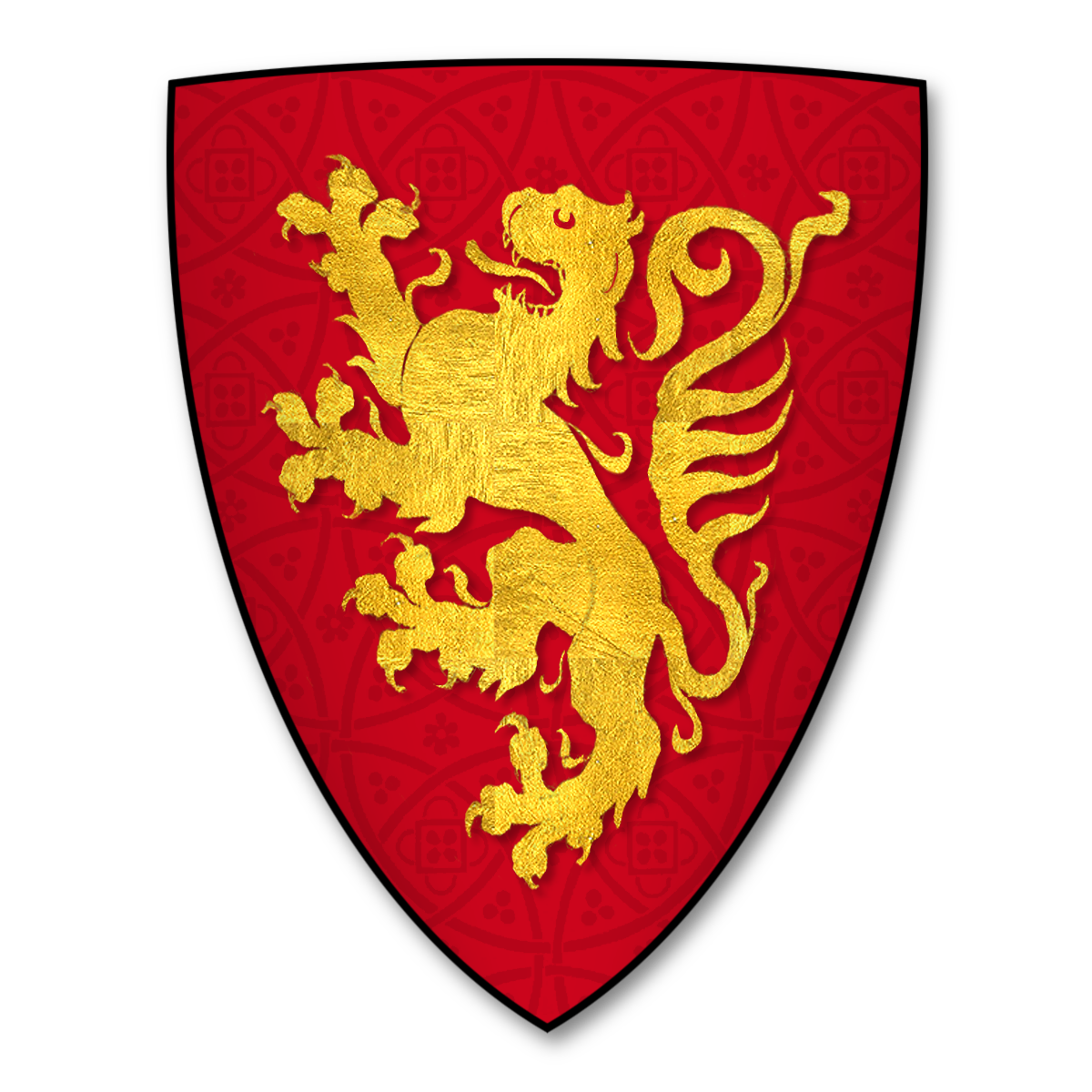
Arms of d'Aubigny, Earls of Arundel, as blazoned in Charles's Roll of Arms (13th century), for Hugh d'Aubigny, 5th Earl of Arundel (d.1243): Gules, a lion rampant or. These arms were adopted by the family of FitzAlan, successors in the Earldom of Arundel; They were recorded as the arms of Richard FitzAlan, 8th Earl of Arundel (1266–1302) in the Falkirk Roll, Glover's Roll and in the Caerlaverock Poem (1300). They are today shown in the 4th quarter of the arms of the Duke of Norfolk, of the family of Fitz-Alan Howard, who holds the subsidiary title Earl of Arundel

Hugh d'Aubigny, 5th Earl of Arundel (died 7 May 1243) was the last in the Aubigny male line to hold Arundel Castle.

He was the son of William d'Aubigny, 3rd Earl of Arundel and younger brother of William d'Aubigny, 4th Earl of Arundel. He inherited his title on the death of his elder brother in 1224. He also inherited the position of hereditary Chief Butler of England for life. In 1242, he was one of the seven earls who accompanied King Henry in his expedition to Aquitaine.

He died on 7 May 1243 and was buried at Wymondham Abbey in Norfolk. His large estates were divided amongst his four sisters and their issue. His title of Earl of Arundel was inherited by his nephew John FitzAlan, 6th Earl of Arundel, son of his sister Isabel d'Aubigny.

He had married Isabel de Warenne (c. 1228–1282), daughter of William de Warenne, 5th Earl of Surrey and Maud Marshal (1192–1248). She was 17 at the time of his death and they had no children. His widow never remarried but became an important countess who founded the Cistercian Abbey at Marham and may have been buried in the Convent Church in Marham.

Peerage of England
Preceded by William d'Aubigny	Earl of Arundel; 1224–1243	Succeeded by John FitzAlan
