= William d'Aubigny, 4th Earl of Arundel =

William d'Aubigny

4th Earl of Arundel
- Tenure: 1221–1224
- Predecessor: William d'Aubigny
- Successor: Hugh d'Aubigny
- Born: c. 1203; Arundel, East Sussex, England
- Died: before 7 August 1224
- Buried: Wymondham Abbey
- Father: William d'Aubigny
- Mother: Mabel of Chester

William d'Aubigny, 4th Earl of Arundel, also known as William de Albini V (b. c. 1203 – before 7 August 1224) was the eldest son of William d'Aubigny, 3rd Earl of Arundel and Mabel of Chester, daughter of Hugh de Kevelioc, 3rd Earl of Chester and Bertrade de Montfort of Évreux. He became Earl of Arundel and Earl of Sussex on 30 March 1221. He was buried at Wymondham Abbey, Norfolk. There is no evidence that he married or had children. He was the Chief Butler of England and was succeeded by his brother, Hugh.

Peerage of England
Preceded by William d'Aubigny	Earl of Arundel; 1221–1224	Succeeded by Hugh d'Aubigny
