= William d'Aubigny, 3rd Earl of Arundel =

English Earl of Arundel (died 1221)

William d'Aubigny
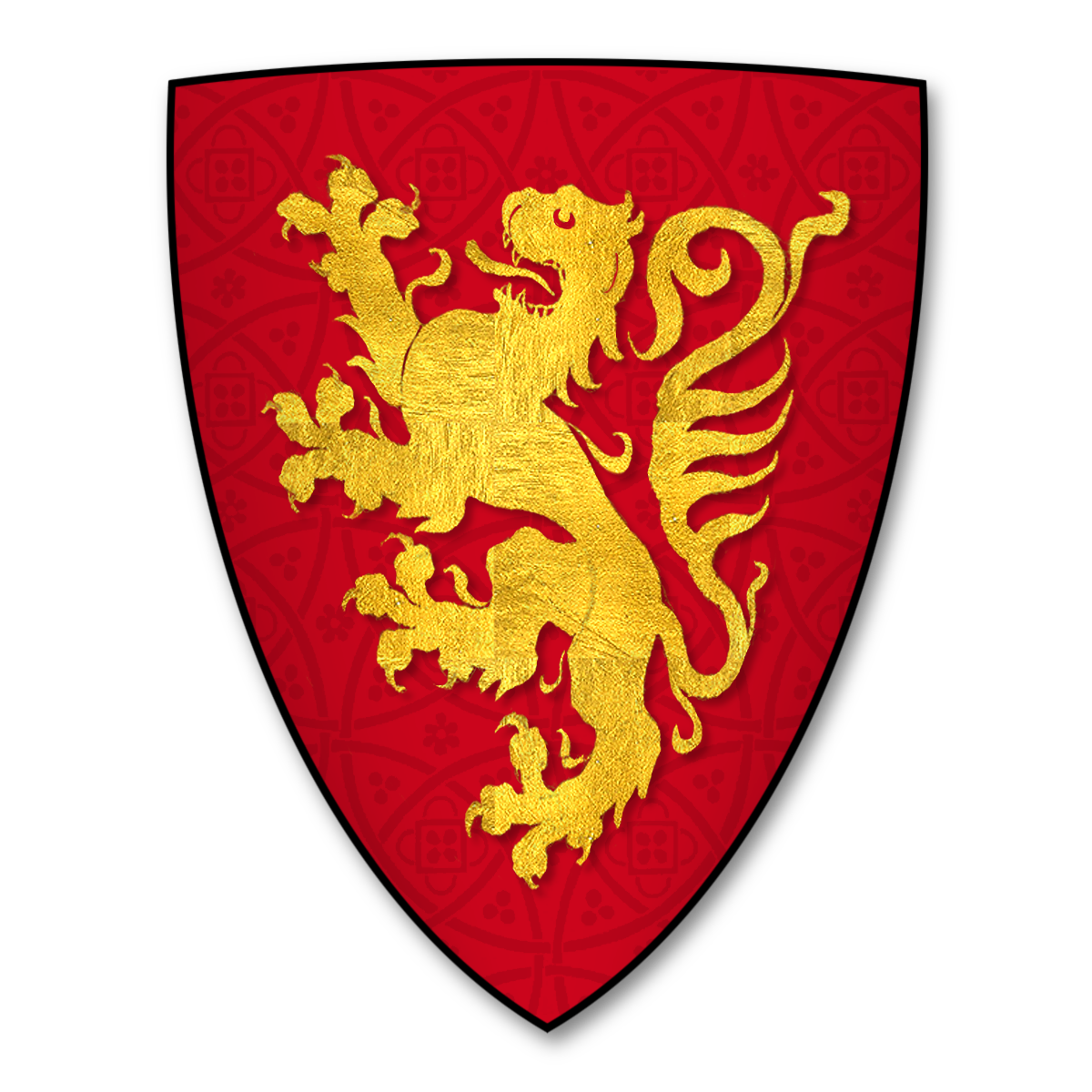

3rd Earl of Arundel
- Tenure: 1193–1221
- Predecessor: William d'Aubigny
- Heir: William d'Aubigny
- Born: before 1180; Arundel, West Sussex, England
- Died: 1 February 1221; Italy
- Buried: Wymondham Abbey
- Spouse: Mabel of Chester
- Issue: William d'Aubigny; Hugh d'Aubigny; Maud d'Aubigny; Isabel d'Aubigny; Nicole d'Aubigny; Cicely d'Aubigny
- Father: William d'Aubigny
- Mother: Matilda de St Hilary

William d'Aubigny, 3rd Earl of Arundel, also called William de Albini IV, (before 1180 – 1 February 1221) was an English nobleman, a favourite of King John, and a participant in the Fifth Crusade.

== Lineage ==
William was a son of William d'Aubigny, 2nd Earl of Arundel and Matilda de St Hilary, and grandson of Queen Adeliza of Leuven. Their family seat was Arundel Castle.

== A royal favourite ==
William was a favourite of King John. He witnessed King John's concession of the kingdom to the Pope on 15 May 1213. On 14 June 1216 he joined Prince Louis (later Louis VIII of France) after King John abandoned Winchester. He returned to the allegiance of the King Henry III after the Royalist victory at Lincoln, on 14 July 1217.

== Death returning from the Fifth Crusade ==
He joined in the Fifth Crusade (1217–1221), in 1218. He died on his journey home, in Canelli, Italy, near Rome, on 1 February 1221. News of his death reached England on 30 March 1221. He was brought home and buried at Wymondham Abbey in Norfolk.

His title was inherited by his son William, the fourth Earl. The fourth earl died childless and in 1224 the title passed to his brother, Hugh.

== Marriage and issue ==
At some time between 1196 and 1200 William married Mabel of Chester (born c. 1173), the second daughter of Hugh de Kevelioc, 5th Earl of Chester (aliter "Hugh le Meschin"), by his wife Bertrade de Montfort, a daughter of Simon, Count of Evreux in Normandy. By his wife he had the following issue:

- William d'Aubigny, 4th Earl of Arundel (d. 1224); buried in Wymondham Abbey.
- Hugh d'Aubigny, 5th Earl of Arundel (d. 7 May 1243); buried in Wymondham Abbey.
- Maud d'Aubigny, (d. bet. 1238 and 1242), married before 1222, Robert de Tateshal.
- Isabel d'Aubigny; married John Fitzalan, Lord of Oswestry.
- Nicole d'Aubigny (d.abt 1240); married Roger de Somery II, Baron Somery of Dudley Castle (died 26 August 1273).
- Cicely d'Aubigny married Roger de Mahaut/Montalt/Monte Alto of Hawarden (d.1260). Received Castle Rising, co Norfolk.

== Secondary Sources ==
- Lewis Weis, Frederick. Ancestral Roots of Certain American Colonists Who Came to America Before 1700.
- Remfry, P.M. (8 September 1997). Buckenham Castles, 1066 to 1649. SCS. ISBN 1-899376-28-3.
- Cokayne, George .E.; Gibbs, Vicary; Doubleday, Harry.A.; White, Geoffrey H.; Warrand, Duncan; de Walden, Lord Howard (2000) [1910–1959]. The Complete Peerage of England, Scotland, Ireland, Great Britain and the United Kingdom, Extant, Extinct or Dormant. Vol. I (new ed., 13 volumes in 14 ed.). Gloucester: Alan Sutton Publishing.

Peerage of England
| Preceded by William d'Aubigny | Earl of Arundel; 1193–1221 | Succeeded by William d'Aubigny |
