= William d'Aubigny, 2nd Earl of Arundel =

12th-century English Earl of Arundel

William d'Aubigny
- 2nd Earl of Arundel
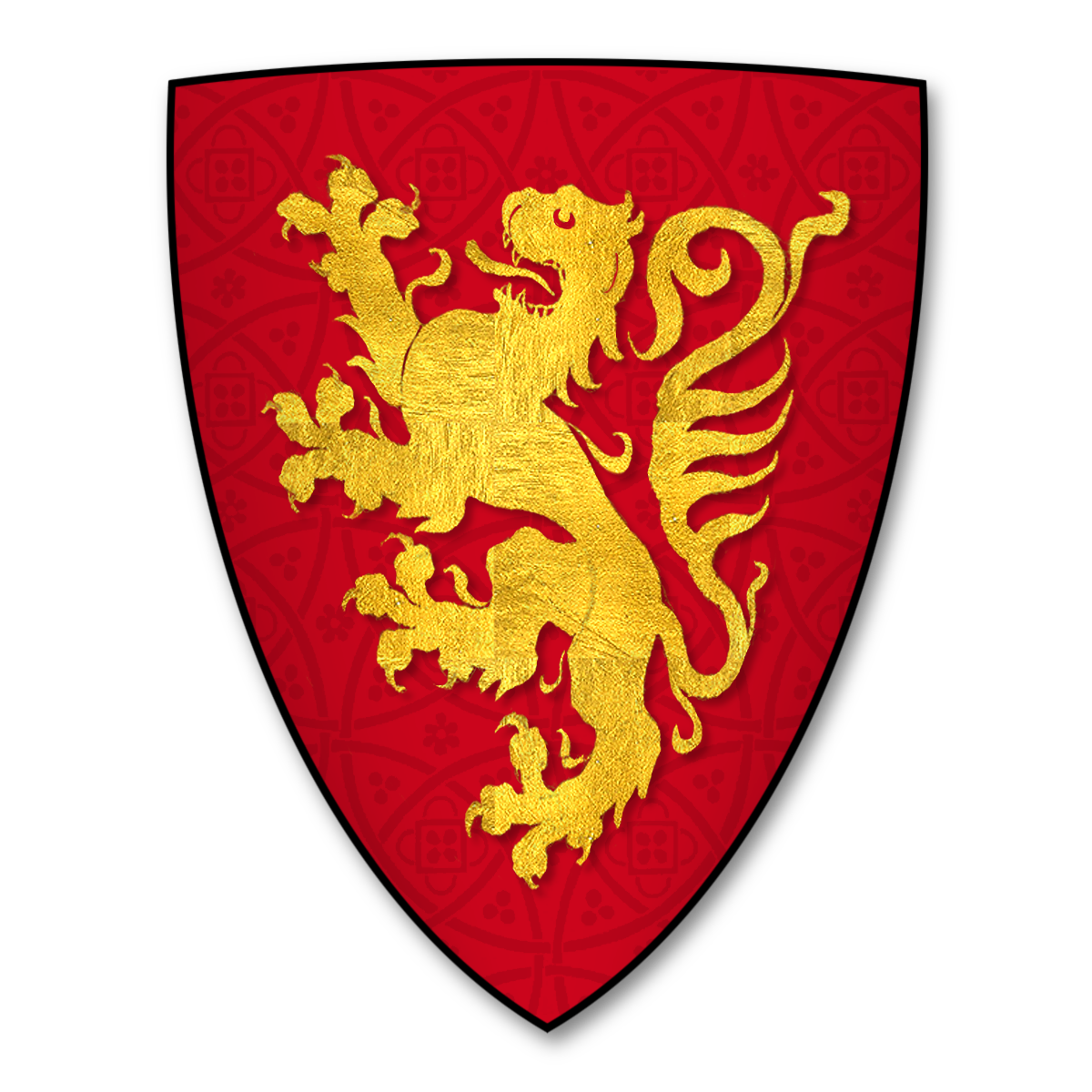
- Died: 24 December 1193
- Spouse: Matilda (or Maud) de St. Hilary
- Issue: William d'Aubigny, 3rd Earl of Arundel; Alan d'Aubigny; Geoffrey d'Aubigny; Matilda, d'Aubigny, countess of Stathearn
- Father: William d'Aubigny, 1st Earl of Arundel
- Mother: Adeliza of Louvain

William d'Aubigny, 2nd Earl of Arundel (b. [1138–1150], d. 24 December 1193), also called William de Albini III, was the son of William d'Aubigny, 1st Earl of Arundel and Adeliza of Louvain, widow of Henry I of England.

== Biography ==
He married Matilda (or Maud) de St. Hilary, widow of Roger de Clare, 2nd Earl of Hertford, and among their children was William d'Aubigny, 3rd Earl of Arundel. The Duke of Norfolk's Archives Assistant Librarian Sara Rodger wrote that William "did have three sons, William who succeeded him as Earl in 1196, and Alan and Geoffrey, of whom we know nothing". His daughter, Matilda d'Aubigny, married Gilbert, earl of Strathearn on an unknown date. They had ten children, and she died between 1200 and 1210, and presumably buried in Inchaffrey abby, which she and her husband founded in 1198. In 1176/7 he was created Earl of Sussex and in 1190 he inherited the earldom of Arundel.

Peerage of England
Preceded by William d'Aubigny	Earl of Sussex; Earl of Arundel; 1176–1193	Succeeded by William d'Aubigny
