= Margaret Bryan =

English noble (c. 1468–1552)

Margaret Bryan (née Bourchier; c. 1468 – c. 1551/52) was lady governess to the children of King Henry VIII of England, the future monarchs Mary I, Elizabeth I, and Edward VI, as well as the illegitimate Henry FitzRoy. The position of lady governess in her day resembled less that of the popular modern idea of a governess, more that of a nanny.

She was born in Beningbrough, Yorkshire, to Elizabeth Tilney and Sir Humphrey Bourchier, who was killed at the Battle of Barnet on 14 April 1471 during the series of dynastic civil wars now known as the Wars of the Roses. Humphrey Bourchier was heir to the title Baron Berners, but having predeceased his father John Bourchier, 1st Baron Berners, Margaret's brother John instead succeeded to the title as second Baron Berners. Humphrey Bourchier and Elizabeth Tilney had one further daughter who survived to adulthood. Margaret's younger sister was Anne Bourchier (1470–1530) who married Thomas Fiennes, 8th Lord Dacre in 1492. Their son, also Thomas, was the 9th Lord Dacre who was executed for murder in 1541.

== Marriages ==
Margaret Bourchier was married three times. Her first husband, with whom there may only have been a marriage agreement (a 'pre-contract'), was Sir John Sandys, son of Sir William Sandys of the Vyne. The marriage agreement was signed when Margaret was 10 or 11 years old on 11 November 1478. They had one child.

She married Sir Thomas Bryan before 1495. Margaret was a lady-in-waiting to Catherine of Aragon and was present at Catherine's wedding to Henry VIII in 1509. Margaret Bryan claimed to have been made Baroness Bryan suo jure on 18 February 1516, upon the birth of Henry and Catherine's daughter Mary, when she was appointed the infant's lady governess.

Sir Thomas Bryan died around 1517, and his widow married her final husband, David Soche before 1523. He was a younger son of John Soche, Esq and his wife, Eleanor St. John. On 7 July 1519, there is a record in the archives of Henry VIII's court that notes the payment of an annuity of 25 pounds to Margaret. "MARGARET BRYAN, widow of Sir Thomas Bryan, and now wife of David Soche." The annuity paid "for services to the King and Queen Katharine" included "one tun of Gascon wine yearly, out of the wine received for the King's use." David Soche may have died in 1536.

== Lady governess ==
Margaret Bryan has been claimed to have been the lady governess for Mary in February 1516. Other sources however notes that it was Elizabeth Denton, king Henry's own former lady governess, who was appointed Mary's first governess. More well known primary evidence exists to connect Bryan with Henry's younger children, Elizabeth and Edward. From August 1536, there is a widely quoted letter from her to Thomas Cromwell, Henry VIII's chief minister, in which she complains of the economic difficulties of the household of "lady Elizabeth" since the change in her status (from legitimate to illegitimate) following the annulment of the King's marriage to her mother Anne Boleyn, and Anne's execution in May.

Now, as my lady Elizabeth is put from that degree she was in, and what degree she is at now I know not but by hearsay, I know not how to order her or myself, or her women or grooms. I beg you to be good lord to her and hers, and that she may have raiment, for she has neither gown nor kirtle nor petticoat, nor linen for smocks, nor kerchiefs, sleeves, rails, bodystychets, handkerchiefs, mufflers, nor "begens."
(The more obscure items in this list are identified by the Oxford English Dictionary (2nd edn) as: rails = nightdresses; bodystychets = corsets; begens = nightcaps.)

She also reports that: "My lady has great pain with her teeth, which come very slowly." (Elizabeth was to have serious difficulties with her teeth on and off for much of her life.)

Margaret Bryan passed over responsibility for Elizabeth to Katherine Champernowne in October 1537 following the birth of Prince Edward, who became her new charge. A second letter to Cromwell, dated 11 March 1539, describes the Prince.

My lord Prince is in good health and merry. Would to God the King and your Lordship had seen him last night. The minstrels played, and his Grace danced and played so wantonly that he could not stand still ...

Margaret Bryan continued to receive payment from a 20-pound annuity until her death.

She died in Leyton, now a suburb of London but at the time a village in Essex.

== Family connections ==
Margaret Bryan had royal Plantagenet bloodlines through her paternal great-grandmother, Anne of Gloucester, who was the granddaughter of King Edward III. She was also the maternal aunt of Henry VIII's wives Anne Boleyn and Catherine Howard as well as a member of the wider circle of kin and dependents around the Howard family.

== Legacy ==
Three of her five children by Sir Thomas Bryan survived: Margaret Bryan, who married Sir Henry Guildford, Elizabeth Bryan, who became the wife of Sir Nicholas Carew, and Sir Francis Bryan, who became Lord Chief Justice of Ireland. Through her daughter, Elizabeth, she was the great-grandmother of Elizabeth Throckmorton, Lady Raleigh, wife to Walter Raleigh and chief lady-in-waiting to Queen Elizabeth I.

== In fiction ==
Margaret Bryan makes an appearance in Kathryn Lasky's novel for young readers, Elizabeth I, Red Rose of the House of Tudor. In the book she is nicknamed "Muggie" by the four-year-old Princess Elizabeth. She also appears in The Lady Elizabeth by Alison Weir.

In the TV series The Tudors, the role of "Lady Margaret Bryan" is played by Jane Brennan. Like many of the characters in the show, she is a composite of the woman on whom she was based and also of Anne Shelton, who was in overall charge of Princess Elizabeth's household. Unlike Margaret Bryan, Anne Shelton had a very difficult relationship with Mary Tudor when she was living in Elizabeth's household.
