= Barbara Strozzi =

Venetian baroque singer and composer

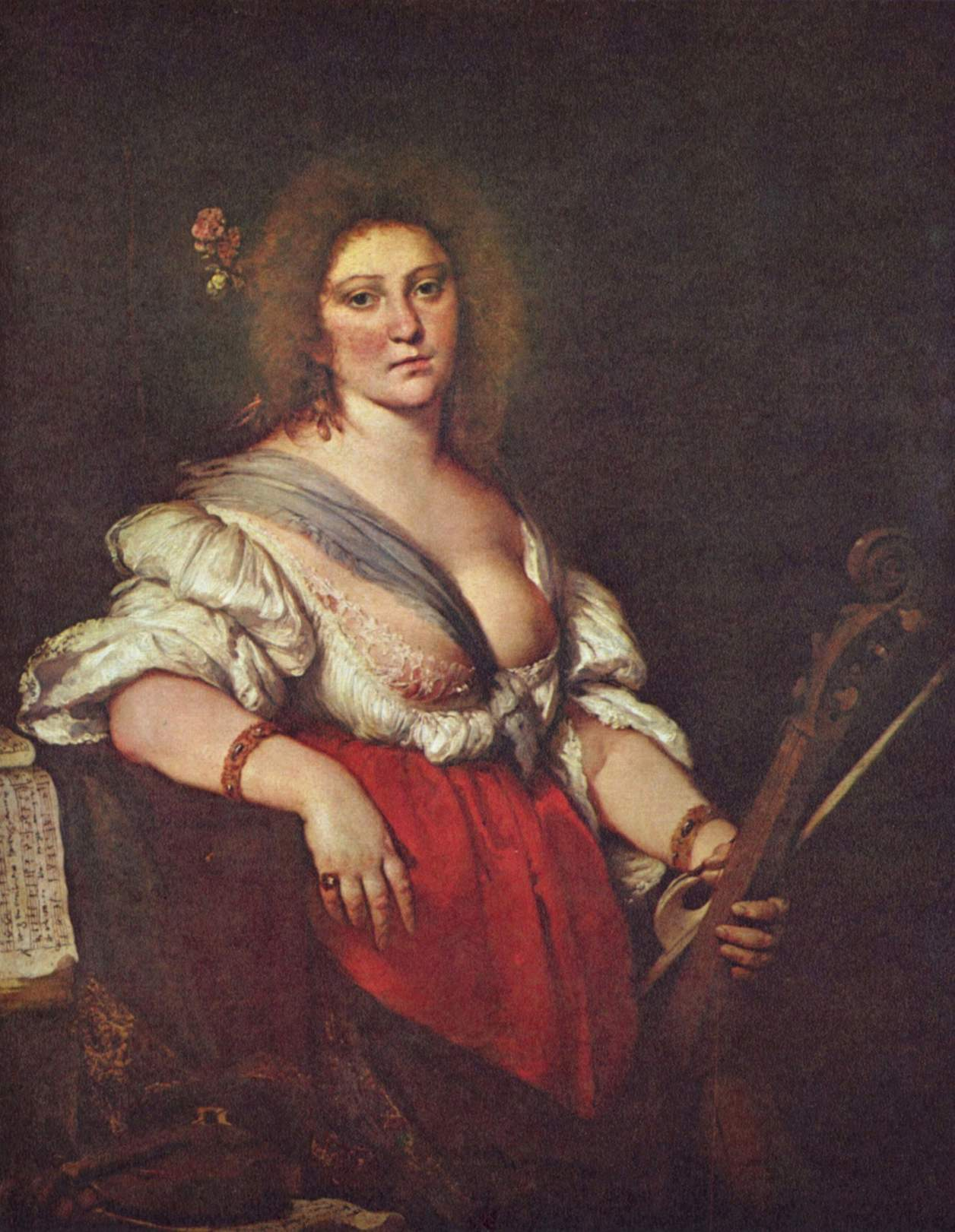
- The Viola da Gamba Player, c. 1630–1640, by Bernardo Strozzi, believed to be of Barbara Strozzi. It is unclear whether the painter is immediately related to the Strozzi family.
- Born: Barbara Valle; 6 August 1619; Venice
- Died: 11 November 1677 (aged 58); Padua
- Occupations: Composer; Singer

Barbara Strozzi (also called Barbara Valle; baptised 6 August 1619 – 11 November 1677) was an Italian composer and singer of the middle Baroque Period. During her lifetime, Strozzi published eight volumes of her own music, and had more secular music in print than any other composer of the era. This was achieved without support from the Church or consistent patronage from the nobility.

== Personal life ==
=== Early life and childhood ===
Barbara Strozzi (at birth, Barbara Valle) was born in Venice in 1619 to a woman known as "La Greghetta" (in other sources she is also referred to as Isabella Griega or Isabella Garzoni). She was baptized in the church of Santa Sofia in the Cannaregio district of Venice. Although her birth certificate does not state her father's identity, it is assumed that her biological father was Giulio Strozzi, a poet and librettist, and a very influential figure in seventeenth-century Venice. He was a member of the Accademia degli Incogniti, one of the largest and most prestigious intellectual academies in Europe and a major political and social force in the Republic of Venice and beyond. He wrote in many literary media, for example, poetry, operas, prose, plays and lyrics for songs. Little is known about Barbara's mother, but historians suspect that Isabella was a servant of Giulio, as both Barbara and her mother lived in Giulio's household and were listed in his will. Although Barbara was an illegitimate child, her father Giulio referred to her as his "adoptive daughter" and was instrumental in helping her establish her career as a musician later in her life. Barbara grew up in a household frequented by the greatest literary and musical minds of the age.

More detailed accounts of Barbara's life concern the end of her childhood and early adolescence. Throughout her childhood, Venice had suffered plagues that killed much of its population. Barbara and her mother survived. She reached the age of 12 by the first Festa della Salute in 1631. By this time, she had begun to develop as a musician and to demonstrate virtuosic vocal talent. Alongside this, she developed the ability to accompany herself on the lute or theorbo. In her book Sounds and Sweet Airs, historian Anna Beer states that Strozzi's musical gifts became more evident in her early adolescence, which led Giulio to arrange lessons in composition for her with one of the leading composers, Francesco Cavalli. By the age of 15, Barbara was described as "la virtuosissima cantatrice di Giulio Strozzi" (Giulio Strozzi's extremely virtuosic singer). Around Barbara's 16th birthday, Giulio started to publicise her talents, ensuring dedications of works for her. Giulio subsequently established the Accademia degli Unisoni, a subsidiary of the Incogniti, which welcomed musicians into the privileged social circle. Unisoni, operating from the Strozzi household, ensured Barbara opportunities of performing as a singer, as well as semi-public performances of her own works. In 1637, at the age of 18, Barbara took her father's last name, Strozzi, keeping it until her death.

=== Later life, children and death ===
Little is known of Strozzi's life during the 1640s. However, it is assumed that she was the concubine of a Venetian nobleman, Giovanni Paolo Vidman. He was a patron of the arts and an associate of Giulio Strozzi. Although Strozzi never married him (or anyone), the relationship led to three or, possibly four children. Vidman was the father of her son Giulio, then of two daughters, Isabella in 1642 and Laura in 1644, and possibly of a further son, Massimo. Her two daughters joined a convent and one of her sons became a monk. A letter written after Strozzi's death reports she "was raped by Count Vidman, a Venetian nobleman. She had a son who also [that is, like her father] bears the name Giulio Strozzi." It has been suggested that the rape allegation may have been a story circulated to protect Strozzi's reputation, as she had children out of wedlock. However, there is evidence to suggest that she was coerced into the relationship.

During this time, there were financial dealings between Strozzi and Vidman. It is believed that she gave him a loan that would have to be repaid after his death. The near 10% interest might have been a way of ensuring some support for Strozzi and her children after his death.

Strozzi died in Padua in 1677 aged 58. She is believed to have been buried at Eremitani. She did not leave a will so, on her death, her son Giulio Pietro claimed her inheritance in full.

== Professional life ==
=== Life as a young musician ===
By her late teens, Strozzi had started to gain a reputation for her singing. In 1635 and 1636, two volumes of songs were published by Nicole Fontei, called the Bizzarrie poetiche (poetic oddities), full of praise for Strozzi's singing ability. The performance experience that she had at Unisoni equipped her with the vocal expertise that also manifested itself in her later publications, signifying her compositional talent.

As a young musician, Strozzi sought out patronage, but was not always successful. Her opus 2, dedicated to Ferdinand III of Austria and Eleanora of Mantua on the occasion of their marriage, went unnoticed. Other notable dedicatees include Anne de' Medici, the Archduchess of Austria, Nicolò Sagredo, later Doge of Venice, for whom she dedicated her opus 7, and Sophia, Duchess of Brunswick and Lüneburg. She is also assumed to have composed several songs for the Duke of Mantua in 1665, a year after her last known published works.

=== Professional career ===
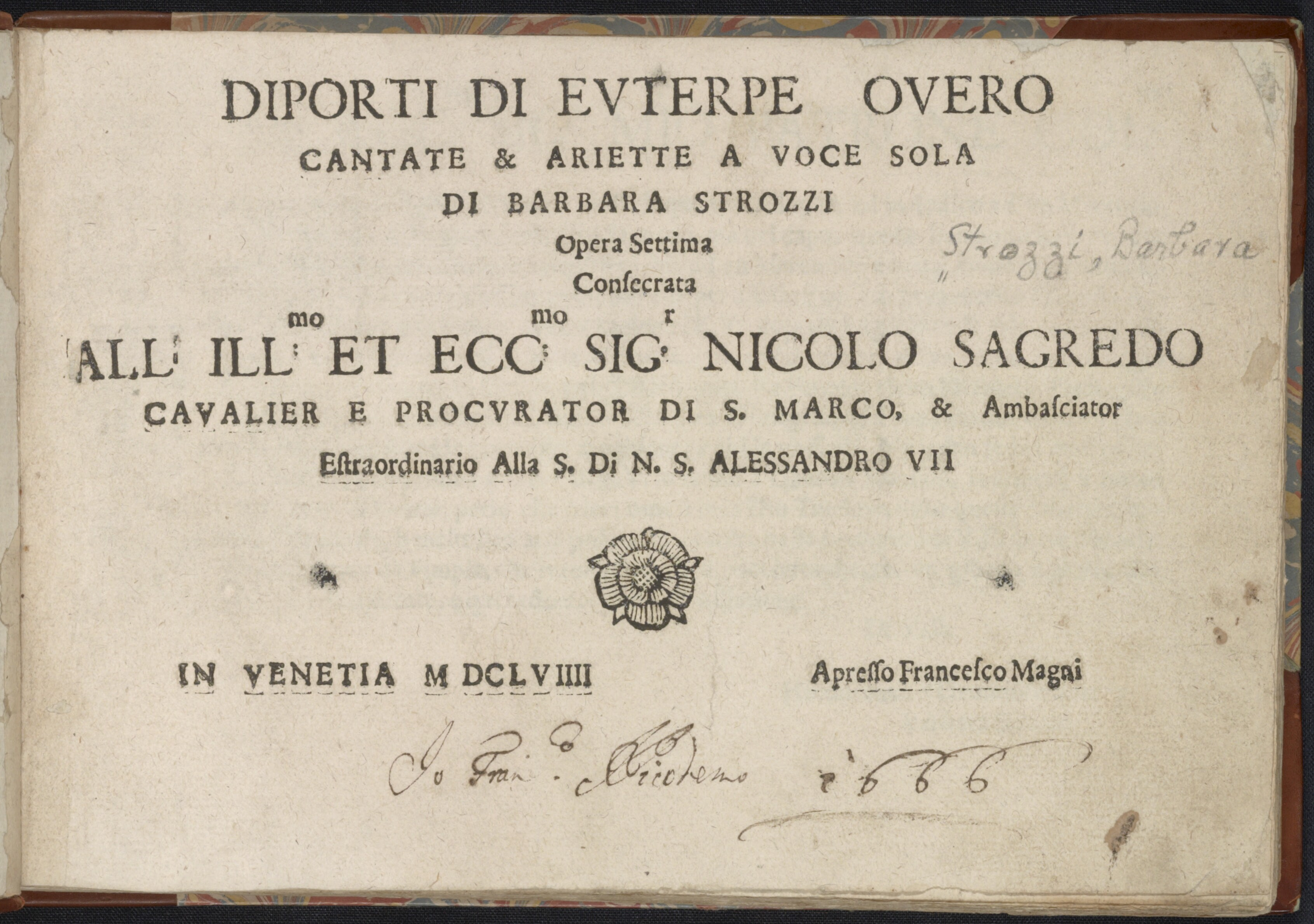
Title page of Diporti di Euterpe, Strozzi's Opus 7, consisting of 8 cantatas.

Strozzi was said to be "the most prolific composer – man or woman – of printed secular vocal music in Venice in the middle of the [17th] century." Her output is also unique in that it only contains secular vocal music, with the exception of one volume of sacred songs. She was renowned for her poetic ability as well as her compositional talent. Her lyrics were often poetic and well-articulated.

=== Compositional style ===
Like many of her contemporary composers, Strozzi mostly used texts from the poet Marino. These Marinist texts would serve as a vehicle to express herself as well as to challenge the gender roles of her time. Il primo libro di madrigali, per 2–5 voci e basso continuo, op. 1 (1644), was dedicated to Vittoria della Rovere, the Venetian-born Grand Duchess of Tuscany. The text is a poem by her father, Giulio Strozzi. Strozzi published one known work of religious pieces. Her opus 5, written in 1655, was dedicated to the Archduchess of Innsbruck, Anna de Medici. Her motet "Mater Anna" paid homage not only to the Catholic saint/mother of the Virgin Mary but also to the Archduchess. Strozzi was highly sensitive to the subliminal meaning in her texts, and, as is the case with Arcangela Tarabotti, the texts she set often hinted at underlying issues regarding gender.

== Publications, recordings and performances ==
=== Publications ===
- Il primo libro di madrigali, per 2–5 voci e basso continuo, op. 1 (1644)
- Cantate, ariette e duetti, per 2 voci e basso continuo, op. 2 (1651)
- Cantate e ariette, per 1–3 voci e basso continuo, op. 3 (1654)
- Sacri musicali affetti, libro I, op. 5 (1655)
- Quis dabit mihi, mottetto per 3 voci (1656)
- Ariette a voce sola, op. 6 (1657)
- Diporti di Euterpe ovvero Cantate e ariette a voce sola, op. 7 (1659)
- Arie a voce sola, op. 8 (1664)

=== Recordings ===
There are numerous recordings. Some of them contained Barbara's works exclusively, others only indexed few pieces.

- Barbara Strozzi: La Virtuosissima Cantatrice (2011)
- Barbara Strozzi: Ariette a voce sola, Op. 6 / Miroku, Rambaldi (2011)
- Barbara Strozzi: Passioni, Vizi & Virtu / Belanger, Consort Baroque Laurentia (2014)
- Barbara Strozzi: Opera Ottava, Arie & Cantate (2014)
- Barbara Strozzi: Lagrime Mie (2015)
- Due Alme Innamorate – Strozzi, etc / Ensemble Kairos (2006)
- A Golden Treasury of Renaissance Music (2011)
- Lamenti Barocchi Vol 3 / Vartolo, Capella Musicale Di San Petronio (2011)
- Ferveur & Extase / Stephanie D'oustrac, Amarillis (2012)
- La Bella Piu Bella: Songs from Early Baroque Italy (2014)
- Dialoghi A Voce Sola (2015)
- O Magnum Mysterium: Italian Baroque Vocal Music (2015)
- Barbara Strozzi: La Voce Sola, Renata Dubinskaite (Mezzo Soprano) with Canto Fiorito (2021)

=== Performances ===
With the flourishing of the historical performance movement, an increasing number of performances featuring Strozzi's works have been staged over the past few years.

- Chamber Music Foundation of New England, Music of Claudio Monteverdi & Barbara Strozzi (2017)
- Early Music America's 2018 Emerging Artists Showcase during the Bloomington Early Music Festival. (2018)
- Old First Concerts, Ensemble Draca performs Amante Fedele, August 12, 2018. (2018)
- WWFM radio broadcast, Brooklyn Baroque Presents Barbara Strozzi and Her World (2018)

== See also ==
- Women in music
- List of Baroque composers
- List of classical music composers by era

== Citations ==
=== Sources ===
- Beer, Anna (2016). Sounds and Sweet Airs: The Forgotten Women of Classical Music. London: Oneworld Publications. ISBN 978-1-78074-856-6.
- Glixon, Beth L. (1997). "New light on the life and career of Barbara Strozzi". The Musical Quarterly. 81 (2): 311–335. doi:10.1093/mq/81.2.311.
- Glixon, Beth L. (1999). "More on the life and death of Barbara Strozzi". The Musical Quarterly. 83 (1): 134–141. doi:10.1093/mq/83.1.134.
- Heller, Wendy (2006). "Usurping the place of the muses: Barbara Strozzi and the female composer in seventeenth-century Italy". In Stauffer, George B. (ed.). The World of Baroque Music: New Perspectives. Bloomington: Indiana University Press. pp. 145–168. ISBN 978-025334798-5.
- Kendrick, Robert (2002). "Intent and intertextuality in Barbara Strozzi's sacred music". Recercare. 14. Rivista per lo Studio e la Practica della Musica Antica: 65–98. JSTOR 41701379.
- Rosand, Ellen (1986). "The voice of Barbara Strozzi". In Bowers, Jane; Tick, Judith (eds.). Women Making Music: The Western Art Tradition, 1150–1950. Urbana, Illinois: University of Illinois Press. pp. 168–190. ISBN 978-025201204-4.
