= Elizabeth Carew =

Mistress of Henry VIII

- Born: c. 1500
- Died: c. 1546
- Spouse: Nicholas Carew
- Father: Thomas Bryan
- Mother: Margaret Bouchier

Elizabeth Carew (née Bryan; c. 1500 – 1546) was an English courtier and reputed mistress of King Henry VIII.

The Carew coat of arms. Or, 3 lions passant in pale sable

A daughter of Sir Thomas Bryan and Margaret Bourchier, Elizabeth became the wife of Henry VIII's close friend Sir Nicholas Carew, an influential statesman who was eventually executed for his alleged involvement in the Exeter Conspiracy. She is described as being beautiful by many historians.

Her brother, Sir Francis, a member of the Privy Chamber and one of the king's closest friends, sat on the jury that convicted his sister's husband, who was sentenced to death, and thus reduced her to penury.

== Relations ==
She was a first half-cousin of both Anne Boleyn and Catherine Howard and a second half-cousin of Jane Seymour, which increased her standing at court. Her only brother was Sir Francis Bryan, called "the Vicar of Hell" for his lack of principles. She is said to have been friends with Bessie Blount, Henry's mistress who produced an illegitimate son in 1519. Her mother, Margaret Bourchier, was a half-sister of Anne Boleyn's mother, Elizabeth Howard, and also of Catherine Howard's father, Edmund Howard, sharing the same mother but different fathers. Through her mother she was also related to Edward III, Anne Plantagenet, and was the step-granddaughter of Thomas Howard. With Jane Seymour they both shared a great-grandmother; their grandmothers were half-sisters who shared the same mother but had different fathers. Her sister, Margaret Bryan, was married to Sir Henry Guildford.

Through her granddaughter, Elizabeth Throckmorton, Carew is related to Sir Walter Raleigh.

== Life ==
Carew had been raised at court because both of her parents held offices in the royal household. Her father was vice chamberlain of the queen's household and her mother was a lady-in-waiting to Queen Catherine of Aragon. Prior to Elizabeth's marriage, Henry VIII made a grant of £500 to her mother. The grant was "to [Elizabeth's] marriage, which by Gods grace shall be espoused to and wedded to Nicholas Carewe, son and heir apparent to Sir Richard Carewe, knight, before the feast of the Purification of Our Blessed Lady the Virgin," The grant was made on November 7 and both Elizabeth and her mother signed it. Nicholas and Elizabeth were married that December. At that time he was 19 and she was 14. Henry almost certainly arranged their marriage: he attended their wedding and endowed them with a gift of 50 marks' worth of land.

In the early, halcyon days of Henry VIII's reign, Elizabeth and her future husband were members of the king's inner social circle and performed regularly in the masques and dances that were among his favorite pastimes. Notably, she danced in Greenwich in both 1514/1515 and 1518.

Elizabeth also showed an interest in literature. She is credited with persuading her uncle, John Bourchier, to translate the Spanish tale The Castle of Love into English. He is also known to have translated the courtly romance, Huon of Bordeaux, for Elizabeth. Included in her collection of books were copies of Recuyell of the Histories of Troye, The Voyage of Sir Nicholas Carewe, and John Lydgate’s Fall of Princes. Like The Castle of Love and Huon of Bordeaux, Recuyell of the Histories of Troye falls under the genre of romance.

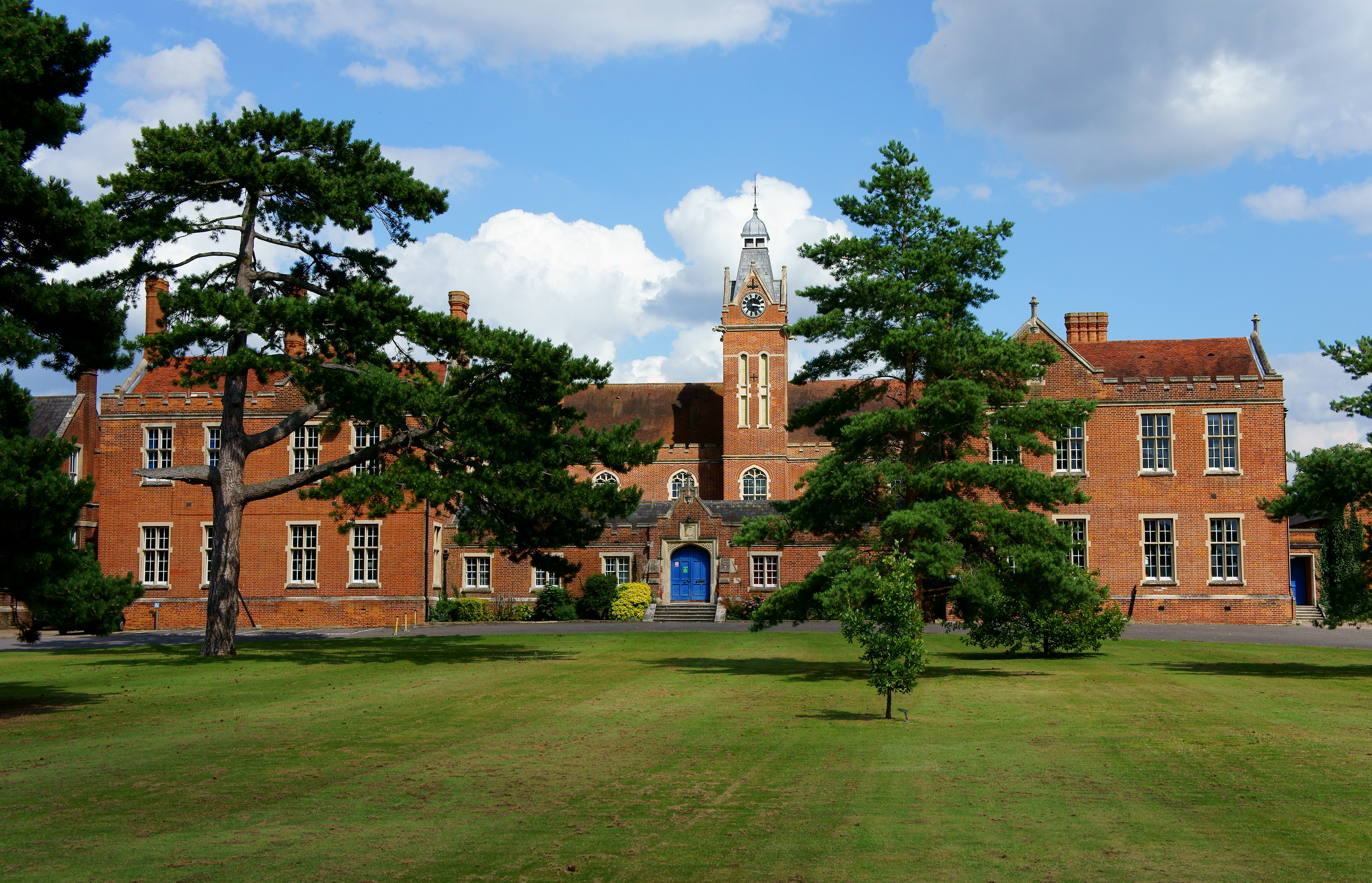
Carew Manor, Beddington

According to a letter written by Cardinal Wolsey, on March 27, 1518, "Mr.Carew and his wife returned to the King's Grace" while the court was in Abingdon. The implication is that they had been sent away from court until then. In February of 1519, the king visited the Carew's home of Beddington for a week and hunted in the adjoining park. In 1520, Elizabeth hosted the duke of Suffolk and his wife (Mary Tudor, former Queen of France). That same year, Elizabeth Carew attended the Field of the Cloth of Gold as one of the Queen's gentlewomen. In 1522, the manor of Bletchingley, Surrey was granted to Elizabeth and Nicholas. Between 10 and 14 November 1528 Henry VIII and Anne Boleyn were guests of Nicholas and Elizabeth at Beddington. This preceded Anne and Henry's marriage. Similarly, prior to Jane Seymour's marriage to Henry, she stayed with the Carews in 1536. After Jane's death a year later, Elizabeth was one of 29 ladies included in her funeral procession.

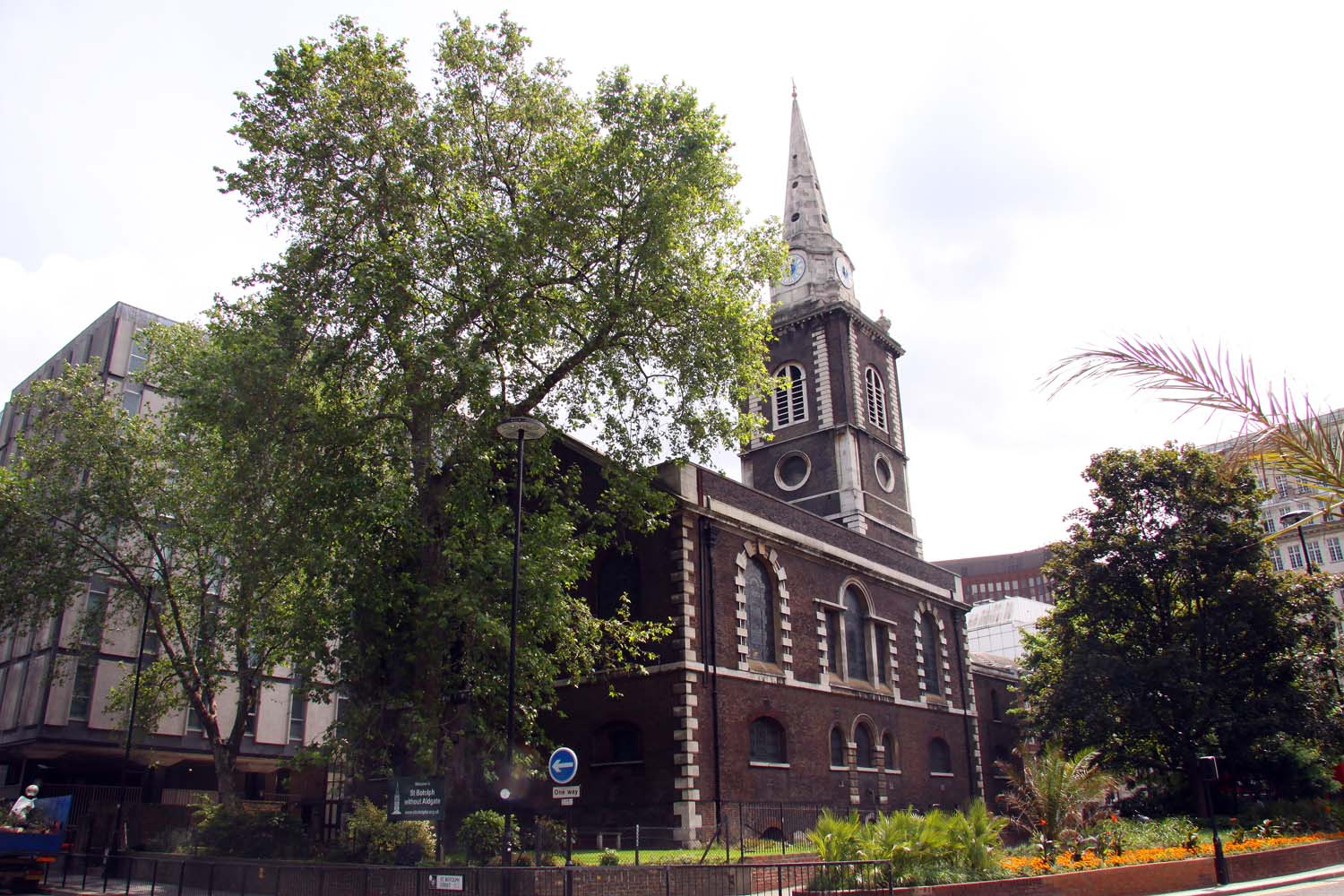
St.Botolph's Aldgate

Elizabeth's husband was beheaded on Tower Hill on March 3, 1539. After this Elizabeth was evicted from Beddington and took refuge at her other property in Wallington. She wrote to Cromwell from there, asking him to intercede for her with the king. Her mother also wrote to Cromwell, saying that Elizabeth "has not been used to straight living and it would grieve me in my old days to lose her." She wanted the king to grant her daughter the manor of Bletchingley, which Henry had given to the Carews in 1522, in addition to the Sussex property. Cromwell agreed to assist Elizabeth and met with her in person at least once. After their meeting, she reported that royal servants who were receiving the income from her husband's forfeited estates had given her £32 but that the money was inadequate for her needs. Furthermore, the house in Wallington was "in great decay," unlike the manor at Bletchingley, which had "a very fair house . . . and all things necessary about it." Elizabeth's previous properties in Bletchingly remained in the king's hands until he granted them to Anne of Cleves as part of their divorce settlement in 1540. Elizabeth was ultimately left with her property in Wallington and land in Sussex worth £120 a year.

Elizabeth died in 1546 and was buried in St.Botolph's Aldgate in London, with her husband.

== Mistress of Henry VIII? ==
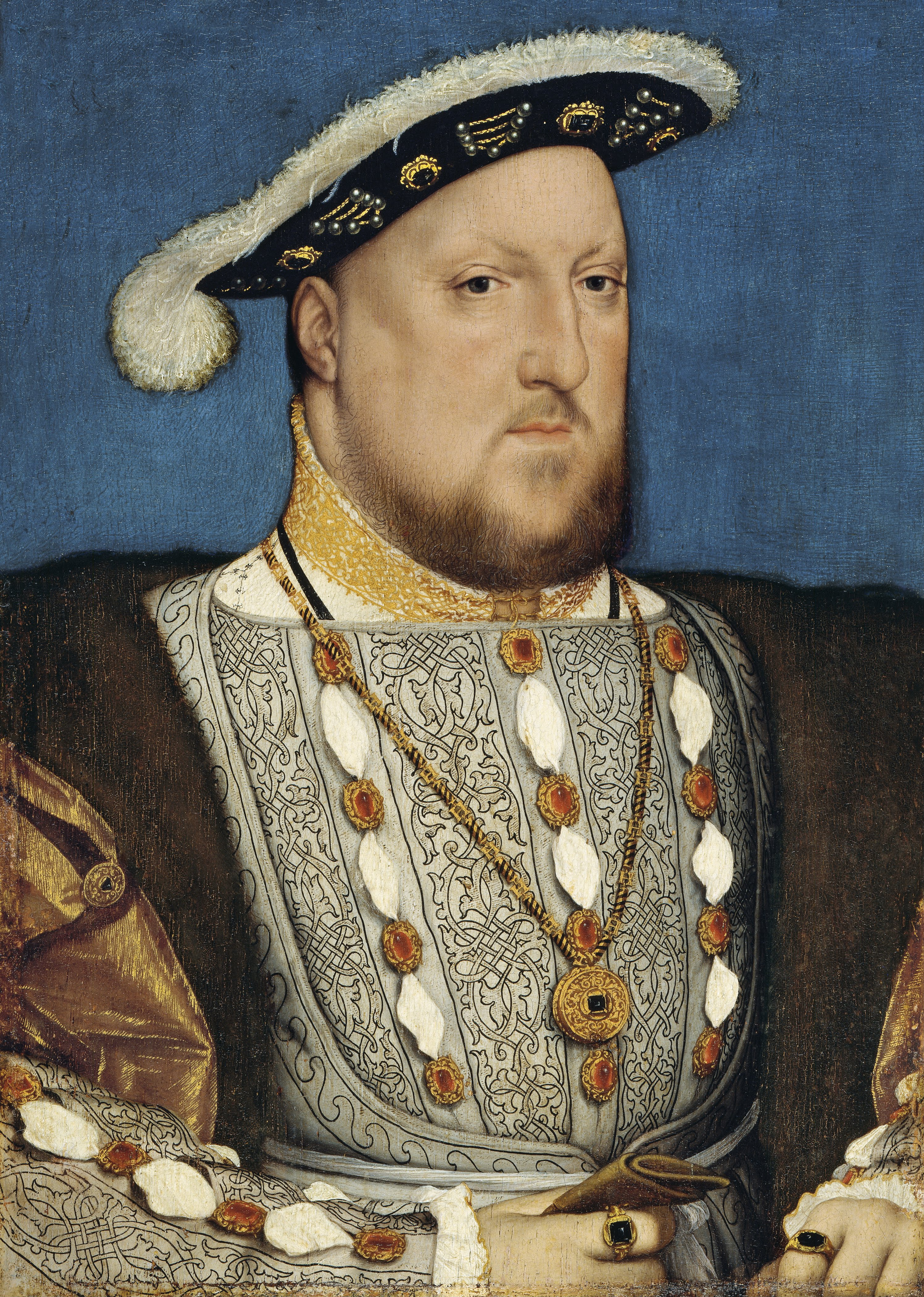
Portrait of Henry VIII by Hans Holbein, the Younger (1497-1543)

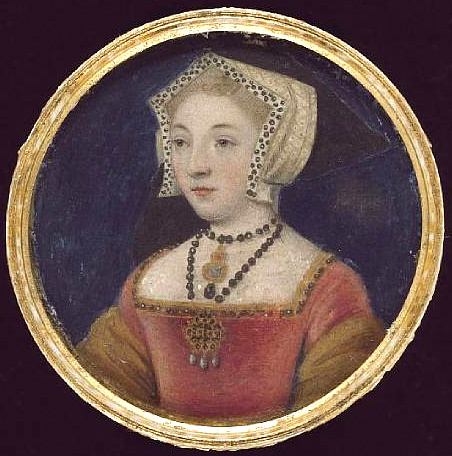
Miniature of Jane Seymour by Wencelaus Hollar

Elizabeth Carew was first rumored to be a mistress of Henry VIII in 1514, when she was 14. These rumors most likely stem from a letter written by Henry's brother in law, Charles Brandon, 1st Duke of Suffolk in which he implies he had been flirting with both Elizabeth and Bessie Blount. In this letter he wrote "I beseech your Grace to [tell] unto Mistress Blount and Mistress Carew the next time that I write unto them or send them tokens they shall either write to me or send me tokens again." This quote has been interpreted by some historians as an invitation to King Henry to take Suffolk's place as the flirtatious pursuer of the two girls. Others have interpreted it as meaning Henry was involved with Bessie Blount and Suffolk was involved with Elizabeth Carew, that the king was having an affair with both Blount and Carew, or that Suffolk was pursuing both women. Of the interpretation that Suffolk was pursuing both women, it has been proposed that his pursuit was one of courtly love rather than lust. In this case, Suffolk's courtly love may have been meant as a way to ingratiate himself to the king.

Further evidence that she may have been the king's mistress also includes the many gifts given to her by Henry VIII over the years In addition to the £500 grant and the 50 marks' worth of land that preceded and succeeded her wedding, Henry is also known to have presented her with other such gifts. These include a diamond necklace, a fur coat, lengths of velvet, cloth of silver and damask, an emerald, and "beautiful diamonds and pearls and innumerable jewels." Records show that the king gave Lady Carew extremely expensive gifts for New Year and on the birth of her son. This may have been because she was the wife of his close friend, although Henry was not usually so generous with the wives of his friends. There is no evidence that Henry and Elizabeth had an affair, but this pattern of gift giving is reminiscent of similar items given to Catherine of Aragon and Anne Boleyn when the king was wooing them.

Alternatively, Henry may have favored Elizabeth so much because he had affection for the whole Bryan family. Elizabeth's mother was one of Henry's most trusted family servants and was charged with caring for his children. Elizabeth's brother, Francis, was also one of the king's close friend. In her book, A Who's Who of Tudor Women, Kathy Lynn Emerson notes that "Queen Jane was very fond of Elizabeth Carew and left her several pieces of jewelry when she died. This gift, described as 'many beautiful diamonds and pearls and innumerable jewels,' seems to be the source of a totally unfounded story that Elizabeth Bryan, as a young teenager, was Henry VIII's mistress."

== Issue ==
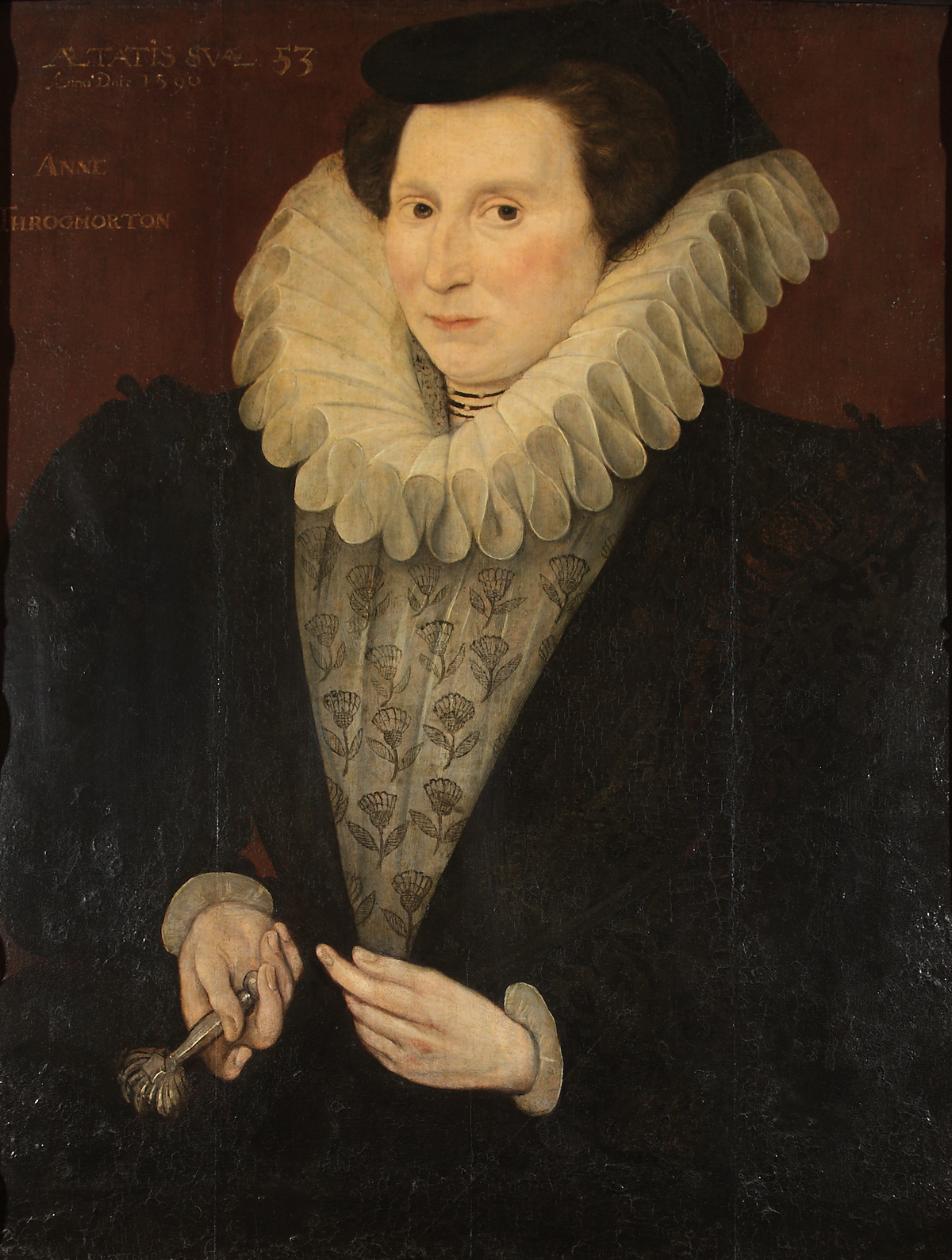
Anne Throckmorton (née Carew), Lady Throckmorton

Elizabeth's children with Nicholas Carew were:

- Anne Carew (about 1520 – 1581)
  - Married the diplomat Nicholas Throckmorton.
  - Their daughter Elizabeth married Sir Walter Raleigh.
- Sir Francis Carew of Beddington (1530 – 1611)
  - Was restored to Nicholas' estates, though he preferred to stay out of politics.
  - Unmarried. Adopted his nephew, Nicholas Throckmorton, who adopted his name.
- Mary Carew (born about 1520)
  - Married Sir Arthur Darcy.
  - They had ten sons and five daughters.
- Elizabeth Carew
- Isabel Carew (born about 1530)
  - Married Nicholas Saunders. They had three sons and four daughters.

== See also ==
- List of English royal mistresses
