= Dick Hosier =

16th-century Welshman fleeing to France

Dick Hosier (fl. 1531), also known as Blanche Rose, was a Welsh fugitive pursued by the agents of Henry VIII of England after his flight to France in 1531. Due to the English ambassador to France, Francis Bryan's, influence, Dick was imprisoned for eight years in Paris. The French refusal to have him sent to Henry, insisting that he was a French subject born in Orleans, was central in the demands of Henry VIII in 1543 as the two countries prepared for war.
