= Anne Bourchier (disambiguation) =

Anne Bourchier may refer to:

- Anne Bourchier, Baroness Dacre (1470–1530), daughter of Sir Humphrey Bourchier and Elizabeth Tilney
- Anne Bourchier, 7th Baroness Bourchier (1517–1571), daughter of Henry Bourchier, 2nd Earl of Essex, 6th Baron Bourchier
- Lady Anne Bourchier, Countess of Middlesex (born 1631), daughter of Edward Bourchier, 4th Earl of Bath
