= Elizabeth Raleigh =

English lady-in-waiting

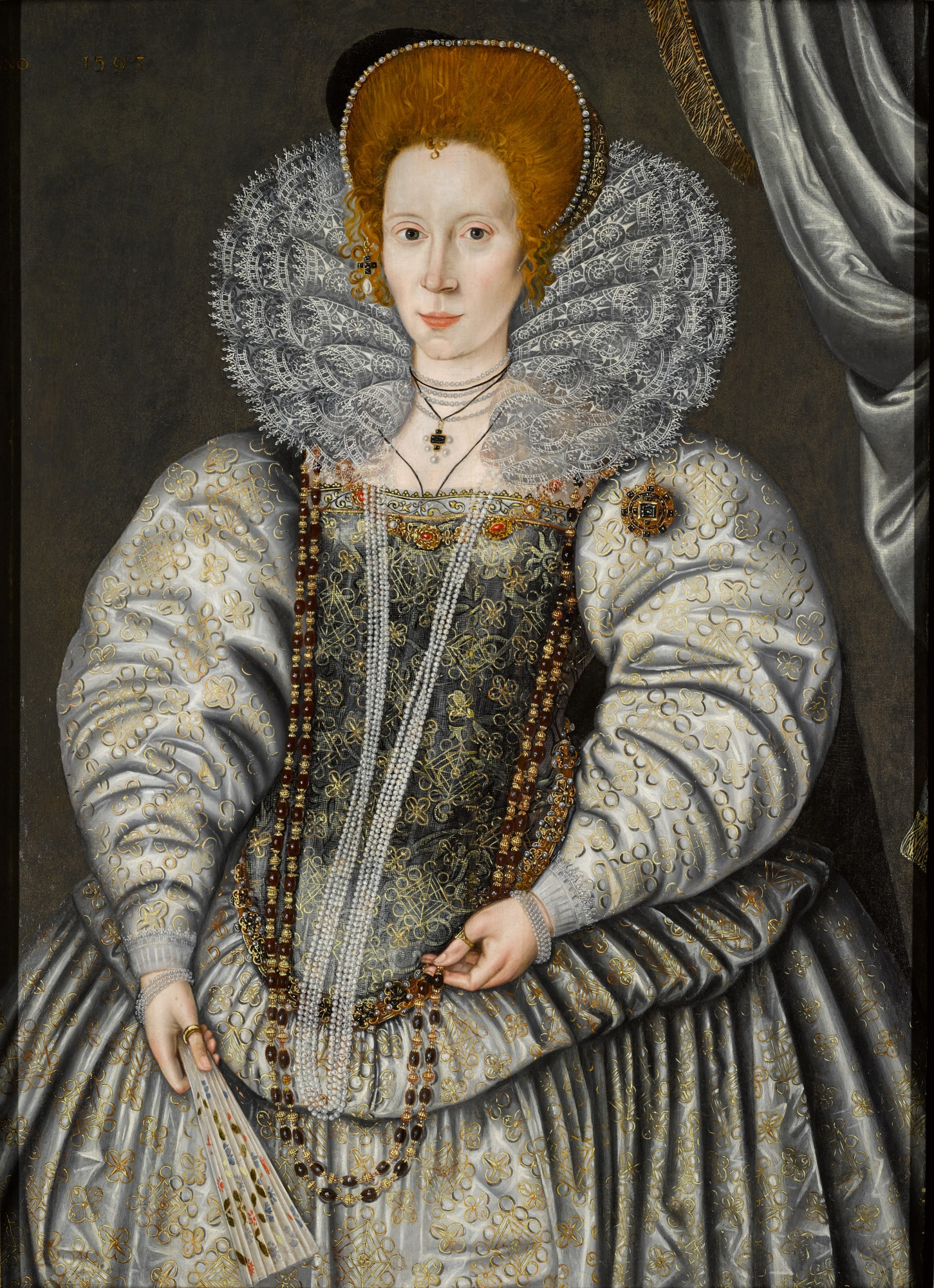
- 1595 portrait
- Born: Elizabeth Throckmorton; 16 April 1565
- Died: 1647 (aged 81–82)
- Spouse: Sir Walter Raleigh
- Children: Damerei Raleigh; Walter "Wat" Raleigh; Carew Raleigh
- Parent(s): Sir Nicholas Throckmorton; Anne Carew

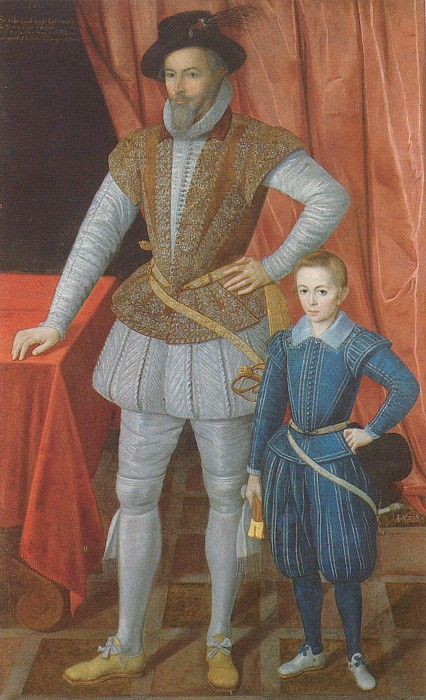
Sir Walter Raleigh and his son Walter, as painted in 1602

Elizabeth, Lady Raleigh (née Throckmorton; 16 April 1565 – c. 1647), was an English courtier, a Gentlewoman of the Privy Chamber to Queen Elizabeth I. Her secret marriage to Sir Walter Raleigh precipitated a long period of royal disfavour for both her and her husband.

== Life ==
Elizabeth, known also as "Bess", was the daughter of the diplomat Sir Nicholas Throckmorton and Anne Carew. Her father, Nicholas, was the nephew of Sir Thomas Parr making him a cousin to the late Queen, Catherine Parr, the sixth wife of King Henry VIII, to whom he served in her household. Her mother, Anne, was the daughter of Elizabeth Bryan who is reputed to have been a mistress of King Henry. That made Anne a niece of Sir Francis Bryan who had been a close confidant to King Henry. Both Elizabeth and Francis had been a first half-cousin of both Queen consorts Anne Boleyn and Catherine Howard and a second half-cousin of Jane Seymour, so Bess was well connected at court. Bess and her brother Arthur were cousins and courtiers to Elizabeth I.

In her book, The Life of Elizabeth I (1998), British author and historian Alison Weir states Throckmorton and Raleigh's first child was conceived by July 1591, the couple were married "in great secrecy" in the autumn of 1591, and their son was born in March 1592. The boy was christened Damerei, after Sir Walter's claimed ancestors, the D'Ameries. Damerei is believed to have died during infancy.

Weir states that Queen Elizabeth first became aware in May 1592 of the secret marriage and of Damerei's birth, despite Bess and Sir Walter's denials. The couple had married without royal permission, but, significantly, Robert Devereux, 2nd Earl of Essex, was in on the secret and acting as godfather to the Raleighs' son. Once the queen found out, she first placed Bess and Raleigh under house arrest, then sent them to the Tower of London, in June 1592. Raleigh was released from the Tower in August 1592 and Bess in December 1592, at which time she joined her husband at Sherborne Castle, his Dorset estate. The couple remained devoted to each other, although, according to Weir, Bess proved to be a domineering wife. Anna Beer, Lady Raleigh's biographer, offers a different perspective, pointing out that due to Raleigh's frequent absences, whether on expeditions, diplomatic duties, or in prison, Bess had to shoulder an unusual level of responsibility for a woman of her time. The Raleighs' second son, Walter, was born in 1593 at Sherborne.

After the Union of Crowns in 1603, many courtiers travelled to Northamptonshire to greet the new queen, Anne of Denmark, and her children, and to seek royal favour. Lord Buckhurst wrote on 21 June 1603 that he and the Lord Keeper Thomas Egerton were travelling "to do our duties to the Queen, the Prince, and Princess, all the world flying beforehand to see her". Bess made the same trip, but was disappointed. Sir Robert Crosse wrote that she had persuaded him to make an "idle journey" to meet the queen and she had received "but idle graces".

The couple's third son was born in January 1605, by which time Raleigh was again a prisoner in the Tower of London. Named Carew, which was both Bess's mother's maiden name and the name of one of Raleigh's brothers, he was christened within the walls of the Tower in the church of St Peter ad Vincula. After Raleigh's execution in 1618, Bess worked tirelessly to re-establish her late husband's reputation and, in 1628, saw a Bill of Restitution restore the Raleigh name 'in blood', which allowed her one surviving son to inherit.

Bess is said to have had her husband's head embalmed and to have carried it around with her for the rest of her life, although the only documented reference to Raleigh's head is from the day of his execution, when it was noted that Lady Raleigh and her ladies left the scene carrying Sir Walter's head in a red bag. An account from 1740 claims that, after Bess's death, Raleigh's head was returned to his tomb in St Margaret's, Westminster.

Through both her parents, Bess had connections to Henry VIII. Her father, Nicholas Throckmorton, was the cousin of Henry's sixth wife, Queen Catherine Parr. Anne Carew, Elizabeth's mother, was the daughter of Nicholas Carew and Elizabeth Carew née Bryan. Nicholas had been a close friend of Henry, from childhood until his execution in 1539.

== Fictional depictions ==
Bessie Throckmorton is a major character in Edward German's operetta Merrie England (1902).

Norah Lofts in her 1936 fictionalised biography of Walter Raleigh, Here Was a Man, depicted a full-fledged love triangle, with the two Elizabeths - the Queen and the much younger Lady in Waiting - fiercely vying for Walter Raleigh's love and deeply hating each other. There is no clear historical evidence that things went that far. In later parts of the book, Elizabeth Raleigh is depicted as trying to get Walter to leave the court and live quietly with her at Sherborne, and feeling neglected and abandoned when he returned to the Queen's favor, and as loyally standing by him during his disgrace under King James and voluntarily sharing his twelve years of imprisonment in the Tower.

In the film The Virgin Queen (1955), Elizabeth Throckmorton (referred to as Beth Throgmorton in the film) is portrayed by Joan Collins, Queen Elizabeth by Bette Davis.

Elizabeth Throckmorton is the subject of Rosemary Sutcliff's novel Lady in Waiting (1956). Sutcliff usually refers to her as "Bess".

Elizabeth "Bess" Throckmorton, portrayed by Abbie Cornish, was a featured character in the film Elizabeth: The Golden Age (2007) as a blonde. This sequel to Elizabeth (1998) focuses on the relationships of Elizabeth I (Cate Blanchett) and Bess with Walter Raleigh (Clive Owen), and shows Bess and Raleigh marrying prior to the Spanish Armada (1588), though in fact the couple married in 1591.

Elizabeth Throckmorton, played by actress Phoebe Thomas, appears in the BBC 2 three-part drama documentary series Armada: 12 Days to Save England (2015) as lady-in-waiting to Queen Elizabeth (Anita Dobson), whom the Queen calls "Bes"'. One scene shows the Queen's jealousy of Bess when she realises, from seeing her wearing a brooch, that Bess has a male admirer unknown to the Queen. Another scene shows the Queen's paranoia about the great danger she feels she is in while the Armada is attacking England, with the Queen forcing Bess to taste her food to check for poison.

== Further reading and external links ==
- My Just Desire: The Life of Bess Raleigh, Wife to Sir Walter (ISBN 0-345-45290-9), by Anna Beer
- Elizabeth Throckmorton, Lady Raleigh, West Horsley Pace
- Portrait of Elizabeth Raleigh, National Gallery of Ireland
