= John Bourchier, 2nd Baron Berners =

English soldier, statesman and translator (1467–1533)

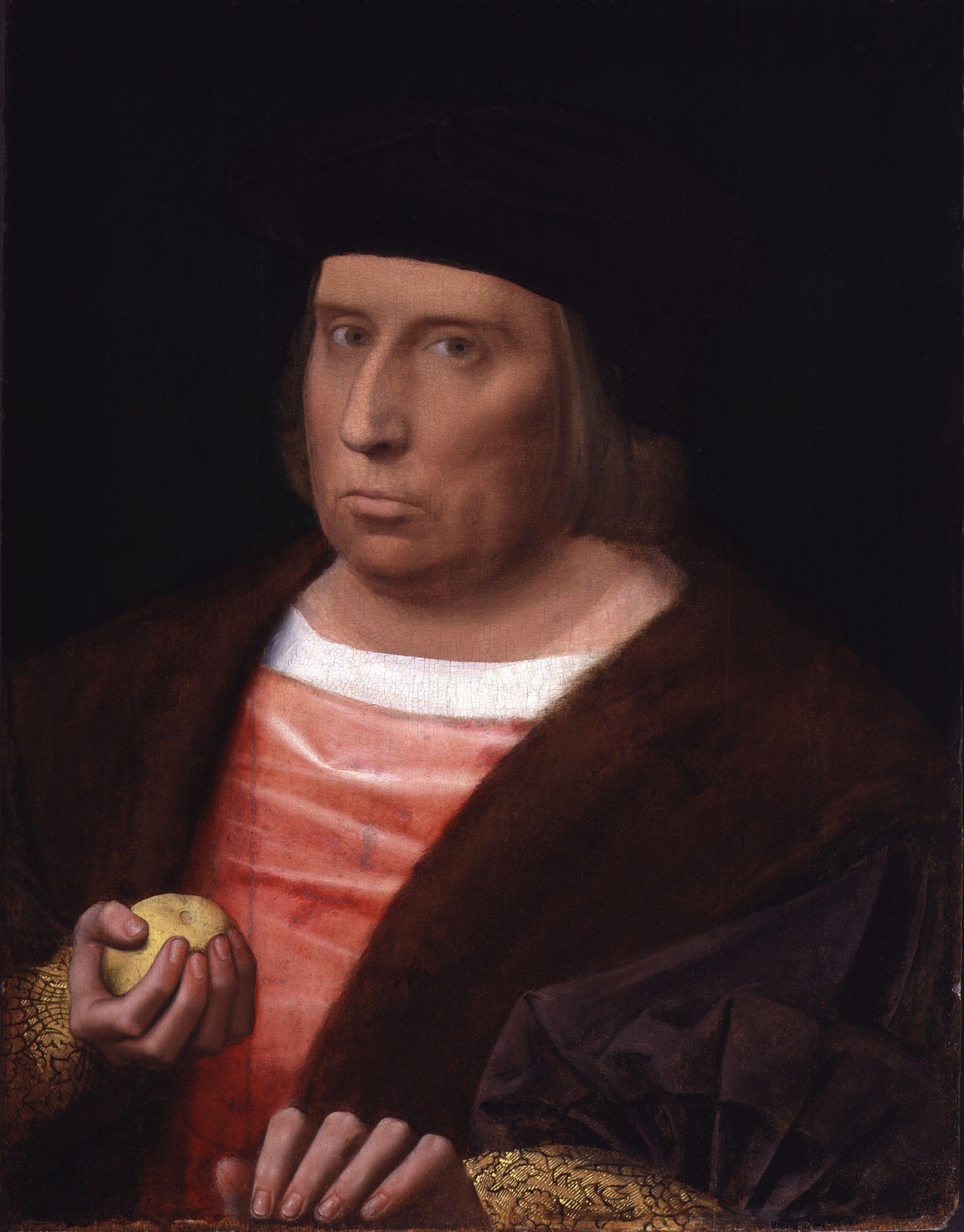
- Portrait by Ambrosius Benson, 1520–1526
- Born: c. 1467
- Died: 19 March 1533; Calais
- Buried: Calais
- Spouses: Katherine Howard; Margaret Chedworth
- Issue: Thomas Bourchier; Joan Bourchier; Margaret Bourchier; Mary Bourchier; Humphrey Bourchier; James Bourchier; George Bourchier; Ursula Bourchier
- Father: Humphrey Bourchier
- Mother: Elizabeth Tilney

John Bourchier, 2nd Baron Berners (1467 – 19 March 1533) was an English soldier, statesman and translator.

== Family ==
John Bourchier, born about 1467, was the only son of Humphrey Bourchier (d. 1471 at the Battle of Barnet) and Elizabeth Tilney (d. 1497), the daughter and sole heir of Sir Frederick Tilney of Boston, Lincolnshire. Through his father, Bourchier was descended from King Edward III; his great-grandmother, Anne of Gloucester, was the daughter of Thomas of Woodstock, King Edward's youngest son.

By his mother's first marriage, Bourchier had two sisters, Margaret, who married firstly, John Sandys, secondly, Thomas Bryan, and thirdly, David Zouche, and Anne, who married Thomas Fiennes, 8th Baron Dacre of Gilsland.

After the death of the elder Bourchier, his widow, Elizabeth, married Thomas Howard, then Earl of Surrey, and later Duke of Norfolk. By his mother's second marriage Bourchier had ten half-siblings, Thomas Howard, Edward Howard, Edmund Howard, John Howard, Henry Howard, Charles Howard, Henry Howard, Richard Howard, Elizabeth Howard, and Muriel Howard.

== Career ==
After his father was slain fighting on the Yorkist side at the Battle of Barnet in 1471, Bourchier became a ward of John Howard. Duke of Norfolk. As noted above, Bourchier's mother, Elizabeth, had married as her second husband Thomas Howard, the eldest son and heir of Bourchier's guardian. In 1474, Bourchier's grandfather, John Bourchier, Baron Berners, died, and Bourchier inherited the title at the age of seven.

Bourchier was educated at Oxford University and in 1477 was created a Knight of the Bath. In 1492, he contracted to serve in the wars overseas and took part in suppressing the Cornish rebellion of 1497 in support of Perkin Warbeck. He owned a manor at West Horsley Place, which would be in the path of rebels as they moved from Guilford to Banstead.

In 1513 Bourchier was engaged at the capture of Thérouanne and in 1520 accompanied Henry VIII and his entourage of peers and knights to the king's meeting in France with Francis I of France at the Field of the Cloth of Gold.

Bourchier held various offices of state under King Henry VIII, including Lieutenant of Calais from 28 November 1520 and Chancellor of the Exchequer from 14 July 1524.

Bourchier translated, at the King's request, Froissart's Chronicles (1523–1525), in such a manner as to make a distinct advance in English historical writing, and the Golden Book of Marcus Aurelius (1534), as well as Arthur of Britain: The History of the Most Noble and Valiant Knight Arthur of Little Britain (that is, Brittany; c. 1560), and the romance of Huon of Bordeaux.

Bourchier died at Calais in 1533.

== Marriage and issue ==
Before 13 May 1490 Bourchier married his step-father's half-sister, Katherine Howard, the daughter of John Howard, by his second wife, Margaret Chedworth, and by her had a son and three daughters:

- Thomas Bourchier, who predeceased his father.
- Joan Bourchier (d. 1561), who married Edmund Knyvet (d. 1 May 1539), sergeant porter to King Henry VIII
- Margaret Bourchier, who predeceased her father.
- Mary Bourchier, who married Alexander Unton of Wadley, but died without issue, predeceasing her father.

By a mistress Bourchier had three illegitimate sons and an illegitimate daughter:

- Humphrey Bourchier (d. 1540), esquire, who married Elizabeth Bacon, but had no issue.
- James Bourchier (d. 1554), who married Mary Bannaster, daughter of Humphrey Bannaster.
- George Bourchier
- Ursula Bourchier, who married Sir William Sharington.

After Humphrey Bourchier's death, his widow married George Ferrers.

== Footnotes ==
Peerage of England
Preceded by John Bourchier	Baron Berners; 1474–1533	Succeeded by Jane Knyvett
Political offices
Preceded by Sir Thomas Lovell	Chancellor of the Exchequer of England; 1524–?1533	Succeeded by Thomas Cromwell
