= Elizabeth Denton =

English lady-in-waiting (died 1519)

Elizabeth Denton (died 1519) also called Elizabeth Jerningham, was an English noblewoman and courtier. She was the governess of the English royal children, among them the future king Henry VIII and his daughter Mary I, between 1497 and 1516.

== Biography ==
Elizabeth Denton was born to Sir John Jerningham of Somerleyton Hall (d. 1474) and Agnes Darell. She was the spouse of John Denton (died before 1515).

Elizabeth Denton was the lady-in-waiting of queen Elizabeth of York. In the 1490s she was appointed as governess, Lady Governor or Lady Mistress, to Prince Henry, as well as of his sisters Margaret and Mary. She accompanied princess Margaret Tudor to Scotland in 1503. In 1511, she was appointed governess to the newborn son of Henry VIII and Catherine of Aragon, Henry, Duke of Cornwall, who however died not long afterward. In 1516, she was appointed to be the governess of princess Mary (later Mary I). She was succeeded in this position by Margaret Bryan.

Elizabeth Denton, who had been given a personal pension by the king as a widow in 1515, retired to Blackfriars Precinct, where her will is dated on 26 April 1518, and died in 1519.
