= Henry Guildford =

Member of the Parliament of England

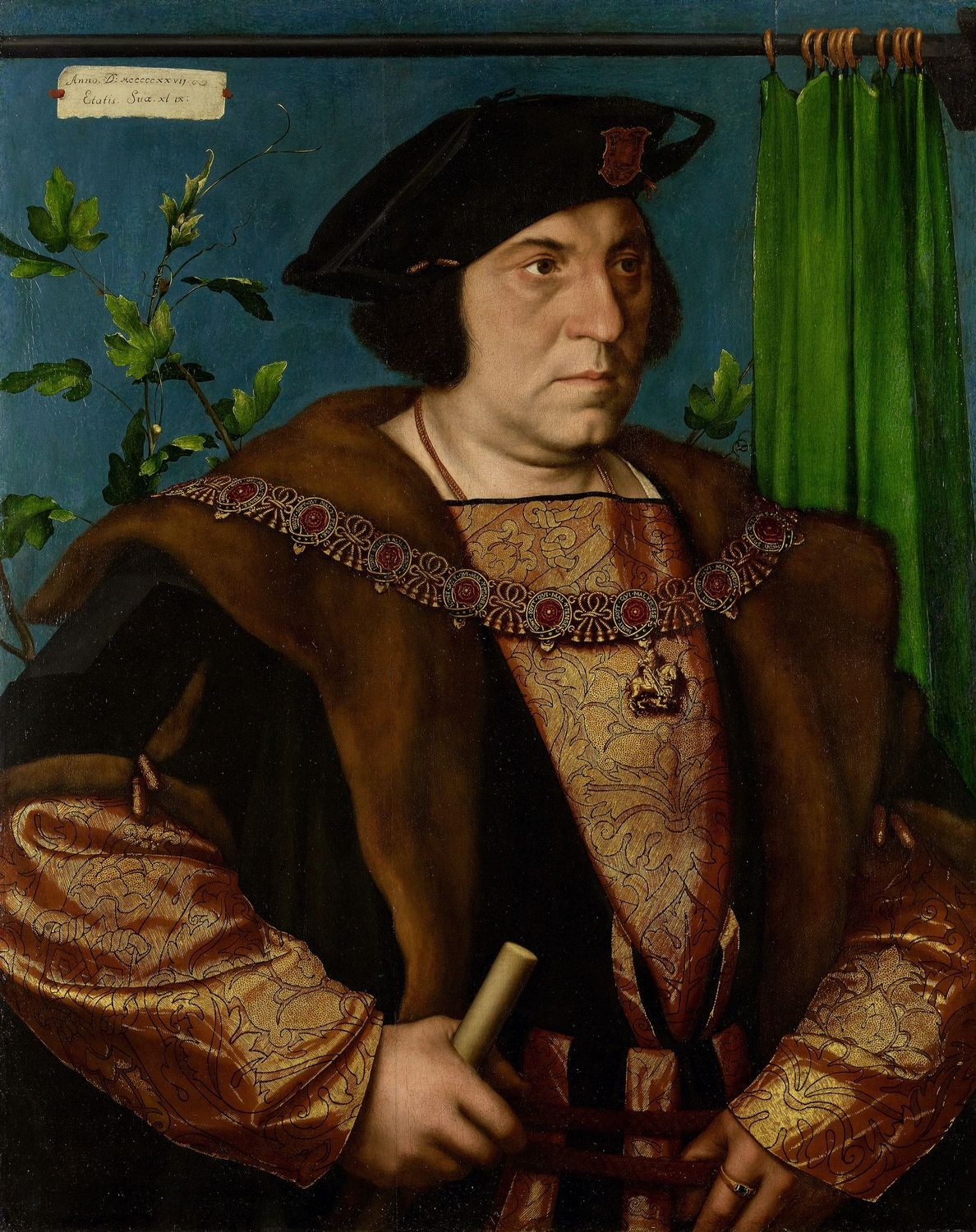
Portrait of Sir Henry Guildford from 1527, by Hans Holbein the Younger. He wears the Collar of the Garter

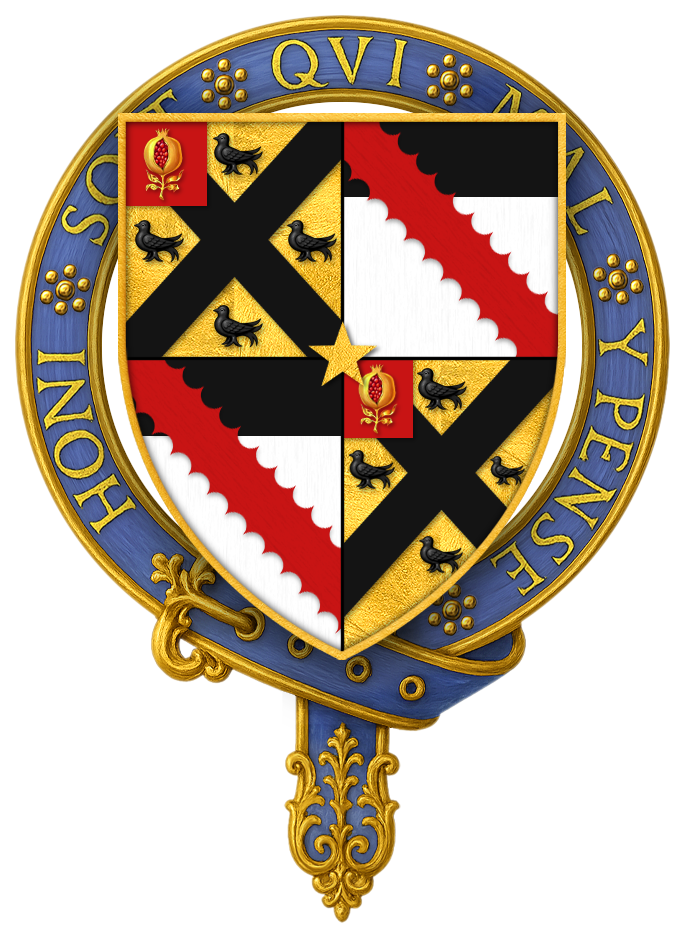
Arms of Sir Henry Guildford, KG

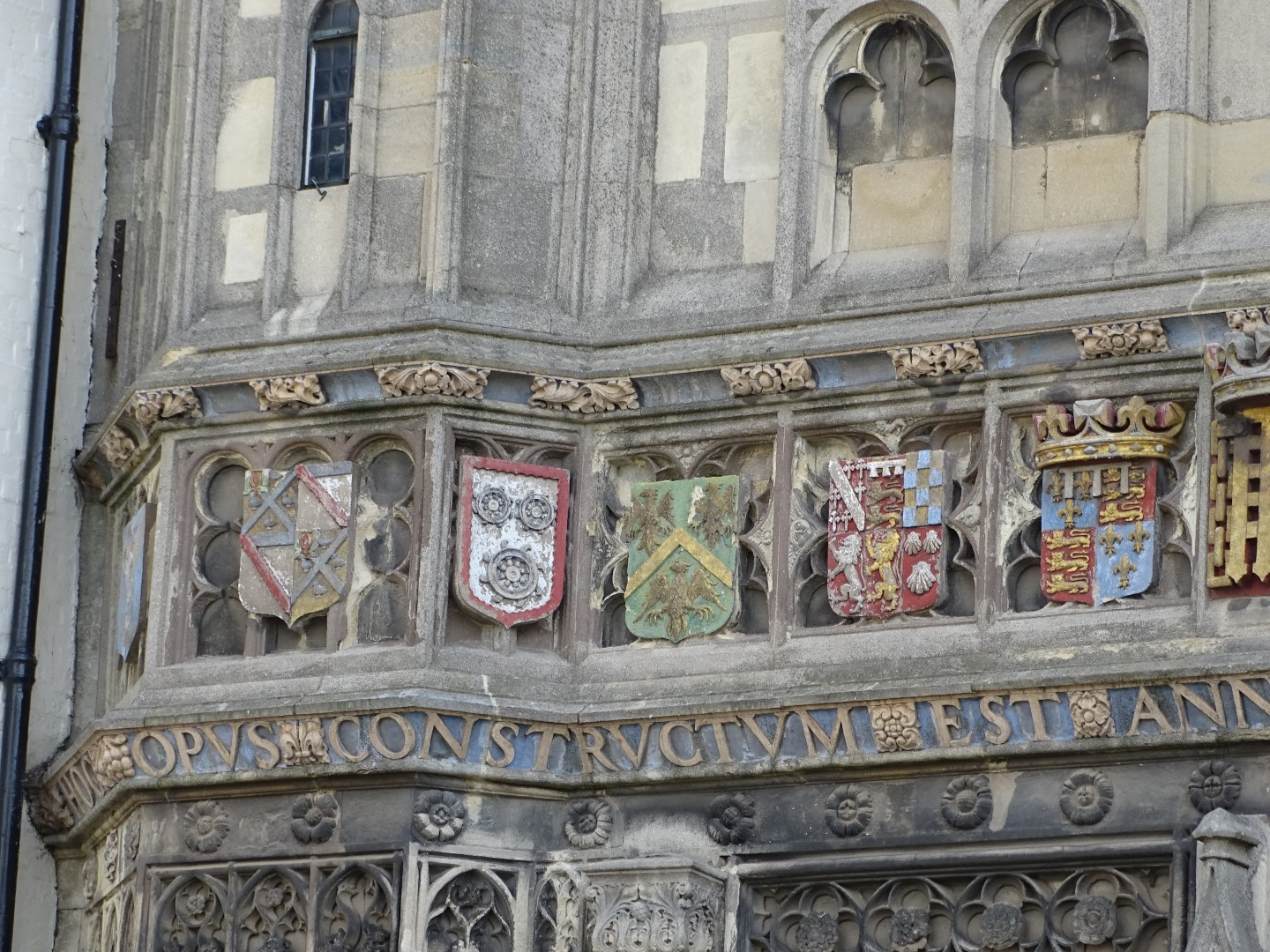
Christchurch Gate, Canterbury Cathedral, Kent, built 1517, displaying (far left) the arms of Sir Henry Guldeford (d.1532). Quarterly of 4: 1&4: Or, a saltire between four martlets sable; 2&3: Argent, a chief sable overall a bend engrailed gules (Halden). He distinguished himself in the Spanish wars against the Moors, and particularly upon the reduction of Grenada; in consequence of which the canton with the pomegranate was placed as an augmentation to his family arms; the pomegranate being the arms of that kingdom. Henry the Eighth, in the sixteenth year of his reign, granted to him the manor of Hadloe, in this county.

Sir Henry Guildford (1489–1532) was an English courtier of the reign of King Henry VIII, master of the horse and comptroller of the royal household.

== Early life ==
He was the son of Sir Richard Guildford by his second marriage to Joan, sister of Sir Nicholas Vaux, 1st Baron Vaux of Harrowden.

He had been a childhood companion and cupbearer of Henry, Duke of York and thus when the Duke acceded to the throne as Henry VIII, Guildford was a young man of twenty, and a favourite with the new king.

On 18 January 1510 he and his half-brother, Sir Edward, formed two of a company of twelve in a performance described by Hall, got up for the amusement of the queen. Eleven of them impersonated Robin Hood and his men, and with a woman representing Maid Marian surprised the queen in her chamber with their dancing and mummery. Next year, on Twelfth Night, he was the designer of the pageant with which the Christmas revelries concluded: a mountain which moved towards the king and opened, and out of which came morris-dancers.

At the tournament next month, held in honour of the birth of a prince, he signed the articles of challenge on the second day. Immediately afterwards he went with Lord Darcy's expedition to Spain against the Moors, where the English generally met with such a cool reception; but he and Sir Wistan Browne remained a while after their countrymen had returned home, and were dubbed knights by Ferdinand at Burgos on 15 September 1511. Early next year they had both returned, and received the same honour at the hands of their own king at the prorogation of the parliament on 30 March 1512. Hitherto he had been only squire of the body, a position he seems still to have retained along with the honour of knighthood. He was also a 'spear' in the king's service, and as of 29 March 1510 he had a grant of the wardship of Anne, daughter and heiress of Sir John Langforde.

== Marriage ==
In May 1512, he married Margaret, daughter of Sir Thomas Bryan. The king's sister, Mary, at that time called Princess of Castile, made an offering of six shillings and eightpence at his marriage. On 6 June, the king granted to him and his wife the manors of Hampton-in-Arden (Warwickshire) and Byker, Swineshead (Lincolnshire).

On 3 December, he was appointed bailiff of Sutton Coldfield in Warwickshire, and keeper of Sutton Park; on the 24th constable and doorward of Leeds Castle, and keeper of the parks of Leeds and Langley in Kent.

== Military service ==
In 1513, he embarked at Southampton with the army that invaded France, and was one of the commanders of "the middle ward", having been appointed on 28 May the king's standard-bearer in the room of Sir Edward Howard, the admiral, who was drowned.

He commanded a hundred men when he passed out of Calais on 30 June. He and Sir Charles Brandon had five shillings a day each as joint captains of the Sovereign, in which posts they crossed the English Channel.

At the winning of Tournai he was created a knight-banneret, and as master of the revels he celebrated the victory by an interlude, in which he himself played before the king.

== Courtier ==
On 6 November 1515, he was appointed Master of the Horse, with a salary of £40 a year, an appointment which he surrendered seven years later in favour of Sir Nicholas Carew. On the same day he had an annuity of fifty marks granted to him as squire of the body. In the same year he became an executor of Sir Thomas Cheney of Irthlingborough, Northamptonshire, and before Christmas was writing to a minstrel in the Low Countries named Hans Nagel, to allure him over to England as a spy who could make reports about the fugitive, Richard De la Pole.

In 1519, he received two letters from Erasmus in praise of the court of Henry VIII. Next year he attended the king as Master of the Horse to the Field of the Cloth of Gold, and also to the meeting with the Emperor Charles V at Gravelines. On 12 February 1521 he had a grant of the custody of the manor of Leeds in Kent, and of the lordship of Langley, near Maidstone, for forty years.

In May 1521, he was one of the justices both in Kent and in Surrey before whom indictments were found against Edward Stafford, 3rd Duke of Buckingham. Next year, on 24 April, the duke's manor of Hadlow in Kent was granted to him. In the autumn of 1521 he accompanied Thomas Wolsey to the Calais conferences, but on 21 September Richard Pace wrote to the cardinal to send him and Francis Brian home, as the king had few to attend him in his privy chamber.

In May 1522 he went again in Wolsey's train to meet the emperor at his landing at Dover. In 1522, after surrendering his post as master of the horse, he was appointed Comptroller of the Household.

In 1523, he became, on the return of Gerald FitzGerald, 9th Earl of Kildare to Ireland, one of the earl's sureties that he would come again on reasonable warning and present himself before the king. On 1 September on the death of his uncle Nicholas Vaux, 1st Baron Vaux of Harrowden, Guilford and three other executors received orders to deliver up Château de Guînes to Lord Sandes.

At this period his personal wealth was growing with many grants, and about this time he is said to have surrendered his office of standard-bearer, which was conferred upon his brother, Sir Edward, in conjunction with Sir Ralph Egerton. He took on administrative duties, such as Chamberlain of the Exchequer from 1525. In 1526, he was invested as a Knight of the Garter.

About 1527, he and the poet Sir Thomas Wyatt built a banqueting-house for the king at Greenwich. He then accompanied Cardinal Wolsey on a diplomatic mission to France, and was acknowledged by Francis I as an ambassador. He was actually receiving at this time a pension from Francis under the treaty of the Moore.

In the spring of 1528 there were seditious rumours in some parts of Kent about demanding repayment of the loan which the people had been forced to contribute to the king; and some even proposed to break into gentlemen's houses, among others that of Guildford's half-brother, Sir Edward, and steal their weapons. This gave Sir Henry much to do, and he ultimately sat on a commission at Rochester for the trial of the malcontents. When Thomas Cromwell came as Wolsey's agent to suppress the small priories in Kent for his college at Oxford, Guildford asked him to visit him at Leeds Castle, with a view to obtaining from him the farm of the suppressed house of Bilsington.

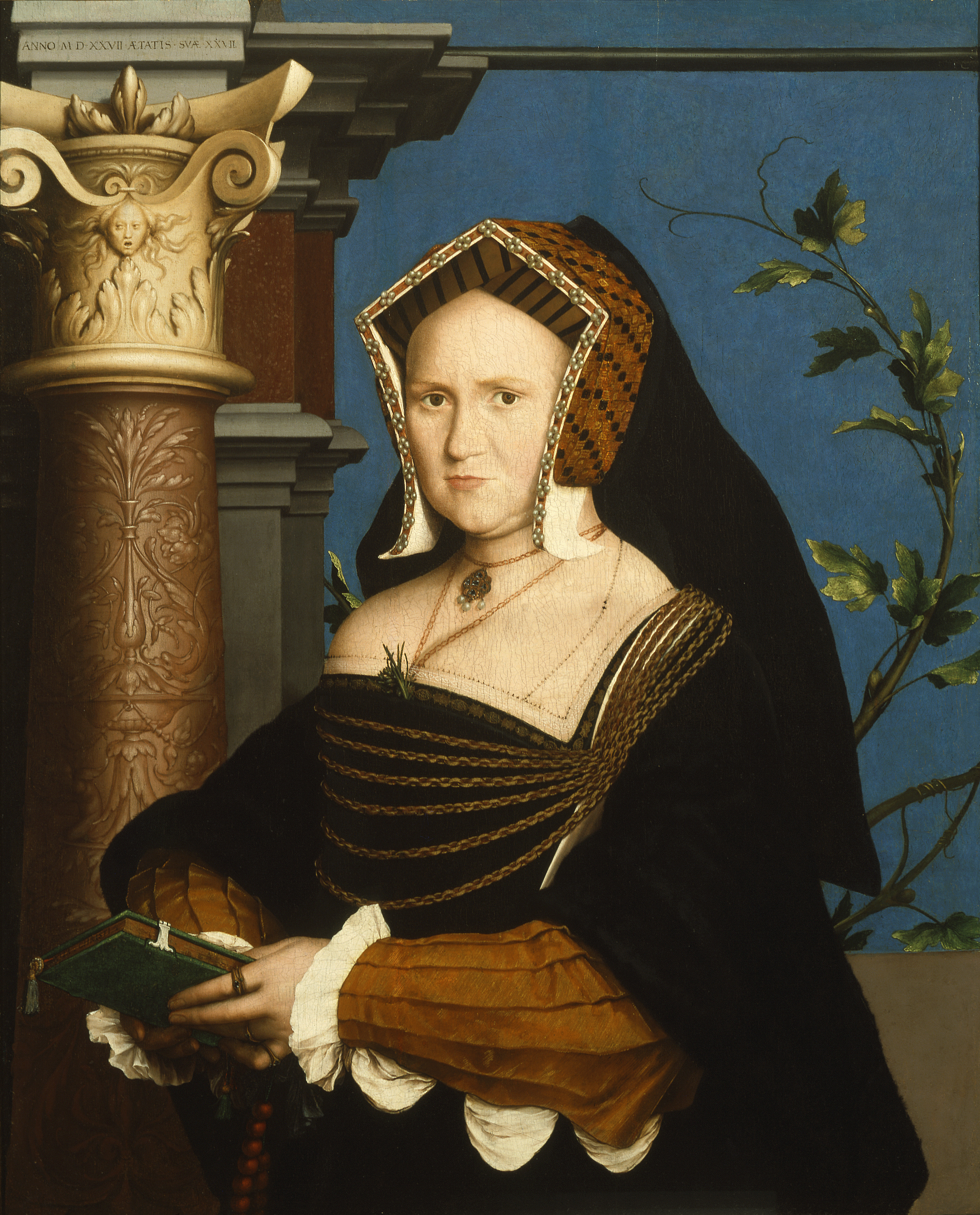
Mary, Sir Henry's second wife, portrait by Hans Holbein the Younger.

== Politics ==
The ravages of the sweating sickness in 1528 caused the justices in Kent, among whom were Sir Henry Guildford and his brother, Sir Edward, to adjourn the sessions at Deptford, where they met 'in a croft nigh unto the street,’ from June till October. At the end of June Sir William Compton died of it, and Guildford was his chief executor. On the arrival of Cardinal Campeggio in England at the end of September he was, as comptroller of the household, much occupied with the preparations for his reception. He met the legate on Barham Downs, and at Dartford informed him of the arrangements for his entering London. In the same year he made an exchange of lands with the priory of Leeds in Kent, and appointed Lord De la Warr and others trustees for the execution of his will. Next year (1529) he was one of the witnesses called to prove the consummation of the marriage between Prince Arthur and Catherine of Aragon; he said that he was not then twelve years old. In the parliament of 1529 he was knight of the shire for Kent, and it was he who gave point to the complaints of the commons against the spiritualty with regard to probates of wills by the statement that he had paid to Wolsey and Archbishop Warham a thousand marks as executor to Sir William Compton. On 1 December he signed the articles brought against Wolsey in parliament. On the 8th he witnessed at Westminster the charter which created Thomas Boleyn Earl of Wiltshire. He was one of those whose friendship the out-of-favour Wolsey secured, on Thomas Cromwell's advice, by a pension. On 13 July he signed the letter of the lords and councillors of England to the pope, urging him to comply with the king's wishes as regards the divorce.

On 23 April 1531 Guilford attended a chapter of the Order of the Garter at Greenwich. He was still in high favour with the king, but he was strongly opposed to the policy the king was now pursuing of casting off his wife without a papal sentence and fortifying himself against the pope and emperor by a French alliance. On this subject he spoke his thoughts freely to Eustace Chapuys and even in court he could not disguise his views; so that Anne Boleyn, looking upon him as an enemy, warned him that when she was queen she would deprive him of his office of comptroller of the household. He answered that she need take no trouble about that, for he would give it up himself, and he immediately went to the king to tender his resignation. The king told him he should not trouble himself about what women said, and twice insisted on his taking back his baton of office; but for a time Guildford retired from court. He still remained one of the king's council. He died in May 1532.

== Family ==
Guildford was twice married, but he died without issue. It does not appear when his first wife, Margaret Bryan, died; she was daughter of Thomas Bryan.

His second was Mary, daughter of Sir Robert Wotton of Boughton Malherbe, Kent and sister of Margaret Wotton, Marchioness of Dorset. She survived him, and as his executrix obtained a release from all her obligations to the king on 25 March 1533, and she afterwards married Sir Gawain Carew of Devonshire.
