= Anna Beer =

British author and lecturer

Anna Beer is a British author and lecturer, primarily known for her work as a biographer.

== Education ==
Anna Beer read English Language and Literature at Oxford from 1984 to 1987, and from 1990 to 1993 at the University of Reading took a MA degree in Politics, Patronage and Literature, and a PhD on the political writings of Walter Raleigh.

== Writings ==
Her particular interests as a biographer are "the relationship between literature, politics and history" (which was the basis for her life of John Milton in 2008), and the rediscovery of neglected lives, the motivation both for her book about Bess Throckmorton, the wife of Sir Walter Raleigh (2004) and her exploration of the lives and work of female composers, Sounds and Sweet Airs: the forgotten women of classical music, which was published by Oneworld Publications in 2016 and shortlisted for the Royal Philharmonic Society Awards in 2017 for Creative Communication. More recently Eve Bites Back: an Alternative History of English Literature explores the lives and work of eight authors, including Jane Austen. It was described in the Times Literary Supplement as 'invigorating'.

Peter Ackroyd described Beer's biography of Milton as "a persuasive reading of the power and complexity of Paradise Lost," while former Poet Laureate Andrew Motion esteems it "a reliable guide to nonspecialists" and "the anniversary present he [Milton] deserves". Philip Pullman called it "a beautifully clear account of a richly complex life...Fascinatingly vivid...It's the best narrative I've read of the life of our greatest public poet".

In 2025, Beer's first novel was published ('Death of an Englishman: an Oxford mystery'), with a sequel in 2026: 'An Inkling of Death', also set in Oxford and featuring Beer's literary sleuth, Eve Brook. Her website presents these books as 'Beer business as usual. Death of an Englishman and An Inkling of Death are filled with all the things that I love: strong female characters, fierce historical debates, beautiful old books, delicious meals and - of course - long train rides.'

== Academic career ==
She was Lecturer in Literature at the Department for Continuing Education at the University of Oxford between 2003 and 2010, and remains a Fellow of Kellogg College, Oxford. She is also a Royal Literary Fund Writing Fellow. She was a Fulbright Distinguished Scholar from 2009 to 2010, is a mentor for the Fulbright Commission and chair of the Fulbright Alumni Council. She was elected a Fellow of the Royal Society of Arts in 2015.

== Gender Inequality in Arts ==
In recent years, Beer's work has focused increasingly on gender inequality in the arts. In an interview in 2022 she said "every day I see something in the news that echoes a tired, sexist cliché (some more toxic than others) from the past – whether the 1400s or 1900s – and that fires me up again. We owe it to these historical women to celebrate their lives and work and there are people right here, right now, who need to think again about their views of women with knowledge and authority".

In this connection, she participated in a 2023 television documentary about Fanny Mendelssohn, whose life as a composer was restricted until she was encouraged by her husband, Wilhelm Hensel. Beer described Hensel as "an unsung hero of the 19th century ... that rare beast, a husband, an artist in his own right, who supported 100% his artist wife ... he gave Fanny Hensel ... year after year the encouragement to take her music out to the wider world."

== Bibliography ==
- Ackroyd, Peter. "Peter Ackroyd examines the legacy of Milton." The Times. 22 February 2008. (accessed April 6, 2010).
- Beer, Anna. Bess: the Life of Lady Ralegh, Wife to Sir Walter. Constable and Robinson. 2004. ISBN 9781841195421
- Beer, Anna. Milton: Poet, Pamphleteer and Patriot. 1st Edition. St Ives Printing and Publishing Company: Bloomsbury, 2008. ISBN 9780747584254
- Beer, Anna. John Milton: Poet, Pamphleteer and Patriot. Lecture. Produced by Oxford University Department for Continuing Education. Performed by Anna Beer. 2008.
- Beer, Anna.
- Beer, Anna. Sounds and Sweet Airs: The Forgotten Women of Classical Music. Oneworld Publications. 2016. ISBN 9781780748566
- Crown, Sarah, and Anna Beer. "Anna Beer on her new biography of poet John Milton." The Guardian Books Podcast. 2008. Podcast.
- guardian.co.uk. "Anna Beer." guardian.co.uk. 6 April 2010. (accessed April 6, 2010).
- Motion, Andrew. "The mystery of genius." The Guardian. 19 January 2008. (accessed April 6, 2010).

== Notes ==
Anna Beer author website
