= Thomas Bryan (courtier) =

English courtier

Sir Thomas Bryan (died c. 30 January 1517) was an English courtier during the reign of Henry VIII.

== Life ==
He was the son of Sir Thomas Bryan. He became a knight of the body to Henry VII and Henry VIII and vice-chamberlain to Catherine of Aragon.

== Family ==
His wife, Lady Margaret, was governess to the King's four acknowledged children, Mary, Elizabeth, Edward, and his illegitimate son, Henry Fitzroy, 1st Duke of Richmond and Somerset. She impressed the King so much that he made her Baroness Bryan in her own right.

Thomas and Margaret had two sons and three daughters: Francis, Thomas, Margaret (wife of Sir Henry Guildford), Anne, and Elizabeth. Francis was a close friend of the King's and of his brother-in-law, Nicholas Carew.

As Lady Bryan was the half-sister of Elizabeth Boleyn, Countess of Wiltshire, she was aunt to Anne Boleyn, the second wife of King Henry VIII. The fortunes improved for the Bryan family during the 1520s and early 1530s. But it was not only Thomas Bryan's nieces by marriage who attracted the King, but also his daughter, Elizabeth Carew; Elizabeth was linked to Henry from 1514 and was said to have been given jewels by Henry VIII that technically belonged to the queen, Catherine of Aragon.
