= Francis Bryan =

English courtier (1490–1550)

Sir Francis Bryan

Lord Justice of Ireland
- Preceded by: William Brabazon
- Succeeded by: Thomas Cusack

Personal details
- Born: June 1490 Buckinghamshire, England
- Died: 2 February 1550 (aged 59) Clonmel, Ireland
- Parents: Thomas Bryan (father); Margaret Bourchier (mother)
- Relatives: Anne Boleyn (half-cousin); Catherine Howard (half-cousin); Jane Seymour (half second cousin)

Sir Francis Bryan (June 1490 – 2 February 1550) was an English courtier and diplomat during the reign of Henry VIII. He was Chief Gentleman of the Privy chamber and Lord Justice of Ireland. Unlike many of his contemporaries, Bryan always retained Henry's favour, achieving this by altering his opinions to conform to the king's. His rakish sexual life and his lack of principle at the time of his cousin Anne Boleyn's downfall led to his earning the nickname the Vicar of Hell.

== Career ==
Francis Bryan emerged from a well-connected and ambitious gentry family whose rise was secured through legal service and advantageous marriage. As the grandson of Sir Thomas Bryan, Chief Justice of the Common Pleas, and the son of Margaret Bourchier, a royal governess with ties to the Boleyn and Howard families, Bryan was born into a world of courtly expectation and noble ambition. Educated and fluent in French, he was well prepared for royal service. His early career began with a naval commission during Henry VIII’s 1513 campaign against France, and he quickly distinguished himself at court through his wit, athleticism, and loyalty. Bryan became a close companion of the king, a member of the group of favored young courtiers known as the "minions", and was appointed Gentleman of the Privy Chamber, Cupbearer, and Master of the Toils. His presence at high-profile events such as the Field of the Cloth of Gold, where he participated in a masque of the Nine Worthies, and his diplomatic assignments in France and the Low Countries reflected the king's confidence in his ability and character.

Though briefly expelled from court in 1519 amid concerns over undue influence, Bryan was soon restored to favor, a testament to his enduring rapport with Henry VIII. He was rewarded for his friendship with the king by a number of public offices, Master of the Toils (1518–48), Constable of the castles of Hertford (1518–34), Harlech (1521-death) and Wallingford (1536). He was also Joint Constable of Esquire of the Body by 1522. Culturally adaptable and politically astute, Bryan embraced French customs and played an increasingly significant role in diplomacy, serving Cardinal Wolsey and participating in secret negotiations with Emperor Charles V. His willingness to speak candidly with the king, combined with a bold yet tactful demeanor, positioned him as a trusted royal servant whose influence would continue to grow throughout the Tudor period.

He was knighted in 1522 for his courage during the capture of Morlaix in Brittany along with the capture of Hesdin and his part in the Duke of Surrey's invasion of France.

Sir Francis Bryan's military career was not his primary path to power, but he did participate in several important campaigns and martial assignments, particularly in the service of Henry VIII's foreign policy goals. His military involvement as part of his broader role as a courtier-diplomat, emphasizes his adaptability more than his battlefield prowess. Bryan's early military experience was shaped during Henry VIII's youthful enthusiasm for war with France. He was present during the 1513 campaign in northern France, including the Siege of Thérouanne and the Battle of the Spurs.

In 1519, Bryan and Sir Edward Neville disgraced themselves in the eyes of the minions' detractors when, during a diplomatic mission to Paris, they threw eggs and stones at the common people. Under the influence of Cardinal Wolsey, Sir Francis was removed from the Privy chamber in 1519, and again in 1526 as part of the Eltham Ordinances.

Shortly after this he lost an eye in a tournament at Greenwich, and had to wear an eyepatch from then on. In 1528, when Sir William Carey's death left a vacancy in the Privy chamber, Bryan returned to fill his place, possibly through the good offices of his cousin Anne Boleyn. From then on he was highly influential, becoming one of the king's most favoured companions, and a leading member of the faction who wished to break Wolsey's grip on power. He was employed on a number of important overseas diplomatic missions. He also sat in the Parliament of England as Member for Buckinghamshire probably in 1529 and certainly in the parliaments of 1539, 1542 and 1545.

Bryan was a half cousin of both Anne Boleyn and Catherine Howard as well as half second cousin to Jane Seymour. He promoted the family of the latter, which was less well connected than the Boleyns and tried to find her a husband after her family had grown notorious because of the affair between Catherine Fillol and Jane's father.

He remained a friend of the King, with Henry even ending his pursuit of a lady when he heard that Bryan was seriously interested in her. 'The Vicar of Hell', as Francis was known, was also a close ally of Nicholas Carew, the husband of Francis's sister, Elizabeth Carew. However, by 1536, Bryan was working with Thomas Cromwell to bring about his cousin's downfall as queen. When Anne Boleyn fell in May 1536, the destruction was comprehensive. Her brother George Boleyn, Viscount Rochford, was executed alongside her. Mark Smeaton, Sir Henry Norris, Sir Francis Weston, and William Brereton all went to the block on charges of adultery and treason. The Boleyn name became poison overnight. And yet Francis Bryan — Anne's own blood cousin, a man who had benefited enormously from the Boleyn ascendancy, who had served on diplomatic missions partly because of his proximity to the queen's faction — emerged not merely unscathed but enhanced. There is evidence suggesting that Bryan actively cooperated with Thomas Cromwell's investigation into Anne, possibly supplying information or at minimum making clear that his loyalties had already migrated elsewhere. Within weeks of Anne's execution, Bryan was visibly aligned with the Seymour faction, smoothly transferring his allegiance to Jane Seymour — who was, conveniently, also his cousin. This moved Cromwell himself to coin Bryan's nickname, in a letter to the Bishop of Winchester, referring to his abandonment of Anne. After Boleyn's death, Bryan became chief Gentleman of the Privy chamber, but was removed from this post in 1539 when Cromwell turned against his former allies. Sir Francis returned to favour following Cromwell's demise, becoming vice-admiral of the fleet, and then Lord Justice of Ireland during the reign of Edward VI.

His appointment as Vice-Admiral in 1543 came amid rising tensions with France and Scotland - responsible for organising and leading naval patrols to intercept French intervention in Scotland. His subsequent appointment as ambassador to Emperor Charles V underscored the trust placed in his diplomatic abilities; his negotiations aimed at securing the emperor’s military support against France revealed political insight and deep loyalty to the crown although ultimately misled by the emperor’s reassurances. His role in the siege of Montreuil and his defence of the Duke of Norfolk’s leadership highlighted his tactical judgement and integrity. Later, amid widespread fears of a French invasion, he was tasked with coordinating coastal defences and investigating unauthorised civil actions in Somerset.

== Character ==
Bryan was a distinguished diplomat, soldier, sailor, cipher, man of letters, and poet. However, he had a lifelong reputation as a rake and a libertine, and was a rumoured accomplice in the king's extramarital affairs. He was a trimmer, changing his views to suit Henry's current policy, but was also one of the few men who dared speak his mind to the king. Patronage and networks at court were crucial mechanisms of power, and Bryan understood and navigated them masterfully. His ability to adapt to shifting power allowed him to thrive where others fell. His career offers a window into the dangerous politics of Henry VIII’s reign.

Bryan’s most defining trait was his political adaptability. Bryan survived nearly the entire reign of Henry VIII, maintaining royal favor despite the downfall of friends and family members — including Anne Boleyn, to whom he was closely connected. His flexibility, charm, and willingness to shift alliances enabled him to endure political upheavals that destroyed others.

Bryan was a complex and cultured man—a Renaissance figure skilled in diplomacy, literature, and espionage. His talents went beyond court intrigue, as a skilled diplomat (especially in France and Ireland); a court poet and translator (he contributed to the early development of English poetry); and, a spy and intelligence agent, possibly involved in gathering sensitive information abroad.

No portrait of Sir Francis survives.

The earliest known person to describe Sir Francis Bryan as “the Vicar of Hell” was John Bale, a 16th-century Protestant polemicist and historian. Bale, who knew many of Henry VIII’s courtiers and had strong reformist views, used the epithet “Vicar of Hell” to condemn Bryan’s moral flexibility and opportunism in Tudor politics—especially his service to Henry VIII during the king’s shifting religious and political loyalties. Bale’s phrase appears in his work Illustrium Majoris Britanniae Scriptorum Summarium (first published in 1548–49), where he criticized various figures at Henry’s court. His description of Bryan as “hell’s vicar” (Latin: vicarius inferni) became the enduring tag attached to Bryan’s reputation thereafter.

Franciscus Bryanus, nobilis Anglus, aulae Henrici VIII a primis adolescentiae annis addictissimus, vir omni flagitio deditus, et (ut vulgo dicebatur) inferni vicarius.

Literal translation:

“Francis Bryan, an English nobleman, most devoted to the court of Henry VIII from his earliest youth, a man given over to every vice, and (as he was commonly called) the Vicar of Hell.”

So Bale attributes the epithet “inferni vicarius” (“Vicar of Hell”) not necessarily as his own invention, but as a nickname already circulating at court — ut vulgo dicebatur (“as it was commonly said”).

The word choice, if it is indeed Bale's, is precise and theologically loaded. A vicar is one who acts in place of another — the word derives from the Latin vicarius, a substitute or deputy. In ecclesiastical usage, a vicar represents a higher authority. To call someone the Vicar of Hell is to say that he acts as the devil's representative on earth, carrying out infernal business in the temporal world. For Bale, who was deeply invested in the idea that the Reformation was a cosmic struggle between Christ and Antichrist, this was not mere name-calling. It was a theological judgment: Bryan, by his moral vacuity, his willingness to serve any master and betray any ally, his indifference to religious truth, had made himself into an agent of spiritual destruction. He did not need to be openly wicked in the manner of a tyrant; his wickedness was subtler and, in Bale's framework, perhaps more dangerous — the wickedness of a man who believed in nothing and would do anything.

== Marriage ==
Before 1522, he married Philippa Spice, who was the daughter of Humphrey Spice of Black Notley, Essex, and the widow of John Fortescue of Ponsbourne.

On 28 August 1548 he married Lady Joan Fitzgerald, the widow of James Butler, 9th Earl of Ormond, and the mother of seven sons. It is believed the marriage was a political manoeuvre to prevent Joan from marrying her cousin, the 15th Earl of Desmond, and the union was not a happy one. After Bryan's death, Lady Joan married in 1551 her third husband, Gerald FitzGerald, 15th Earl of Desmond, who was many years her junior.

On 2 February 1550 Bryan died at the port of Clonmel. Three weeks later Richard Scudamore, financial agent of Philip Hoby, wrote a somewhat disparaging comment concerning Bryan's death:

'Sir Francis Bryan is dead in Ireland, and it is said he died easily, sitting at a table leaning on his elbow, none perceiving any likelihood of death in him. He said these words, "I pray you let me be buried amongst the good fellows of Waterford, who were good drinkers", and upon those words immediately died.'

Irish Chancellor Allen, who was present both at Bryan's death and autopsy, contradicted this account, professing that '...whatever Bryan died of, he departed very godly'. The doctors, who detected no physical ailment, declared that Bryan had died of grief, although we are not told why.

== Portrayals in fiction ==
Bryan is a character in Hilary Mantel's novel Wolf Hall. He is portrayed by actor Felix Scott in the BBC television adaptation.

Bryan is played by actor Alan van Sprang in Season 3 of the television series, The Tudors. In the series, he arrives at Court in 1536 and wears an eye patch, much later than the actual Sir Francis, and so his family ties to the Boleyns are not mentioned, nor are his successes afterwards.

In the 2003 two-part drama Henry VIII starring Ray Winstone, a character named 'Sir Francis' who sports an eye patch and is a former soldier friend of Henry's, makes several appearances.

== Notes ==
Political offices
Unknown	Custos Rotulorum of Buckinghamshire bef. 1544–bef.1547	Succeeded by Francis Russell
