= Anne Say =

15th-century English baroness

- Coat of arms of Say
- Born: c. 1453; Borough of Broxbourne
- Died: 1484–1494 (aged 31–41); Nettlestead, Suffolk
- Buried: Newsham Abbey
- Noble family: Say (by birth); Wentworth (by marriage)
- Spouse: Sir Henry Wentworth
- Issue: Sir Richard Wentworth; Edward Wentworth; Elizabeth Wentworth; Margery Wentworth; Dorothy Wentworth; Jane Wentworth
- Father: Sir John Say
- Mother: Elizabeth Cheney, Lady Say

Anne Say (born c. 1453 – died between 1484 and 1494) was an English baroness through her marriage to Sir Henry Wentworth in c. 1470 until her death. She was the daughter of Sir John Say (c. 1415–1478) and Elizabeth Cheney, Lady Say. She was the maternal grandmother of Jane Seymour, the third wife of King Henry VIII, and the great-grandmother of Edward VI.

== Early life and family ==
Anne Say was born c. 1453 to Sir John Say and Elizabeth Cheney, Lady Say, the daughter of Sir Lawrence Cheney and his wife, Elizabeth Cockayne, daughter of John Cokayne (died 1429) and Ida de Grey. Ida was a daughter of the Welsh Marcher Lord Reginald Grey, 2nd Baron Grey de Ruthyn, and Eleanor Le Strange of Blackmere. Through her mother, Ida was a direct descendant of the Welsh prince Gruffydd II ap Madog.

Anne's father represented Hertfordshire in several Parliaments between 1453 and 1478. He served as Speaker of the House of Commons from 1463 to 1465 and again from 1467 to 1468. From 1455 to 1478, he held the office of under-Treasurer of the Exchequer, and from 1476 he served as Keeper of the Great Wardrobe. Through her mother's first marriage to Sir Frederick Tilney of Ashwellthorpe, Norfolk, and Boston, Lincolnshire, Anne was the half-sister of Elizabeth Tilney. Both sisters would become grandmothers of three of King Henry VIII's wives: Elizabeth was the grandmother of Anne Boleyn and her cousin, Catherine Howard, while Anne was the grandmother of Jane Seymour.

Anne had six other siblings:

- Sir William Say (1452–1529), MP and Sheriff
- Thomas Say, of Liston Hall, Essex
- Leonard Say, clerk, Rector of Spaxton, Somerset
- Mary Say, who married Sir Philip Calthorpe
- Margaret Say, who married Thomas Sampson
- Katherine Say, who married Thomas Bassingbourne

== Marriage and issue ==
On about 25 February 1470, Anne married Henry Wentworth, of Nettlestead, Suffolk. He was the only son and heir of the courtier Philip Wentworth (died 18 May 1464) of Nettlestead, Suffolk, who was beheaded after the Battle of Hexham, and Mary Clifford. The couple had six children:

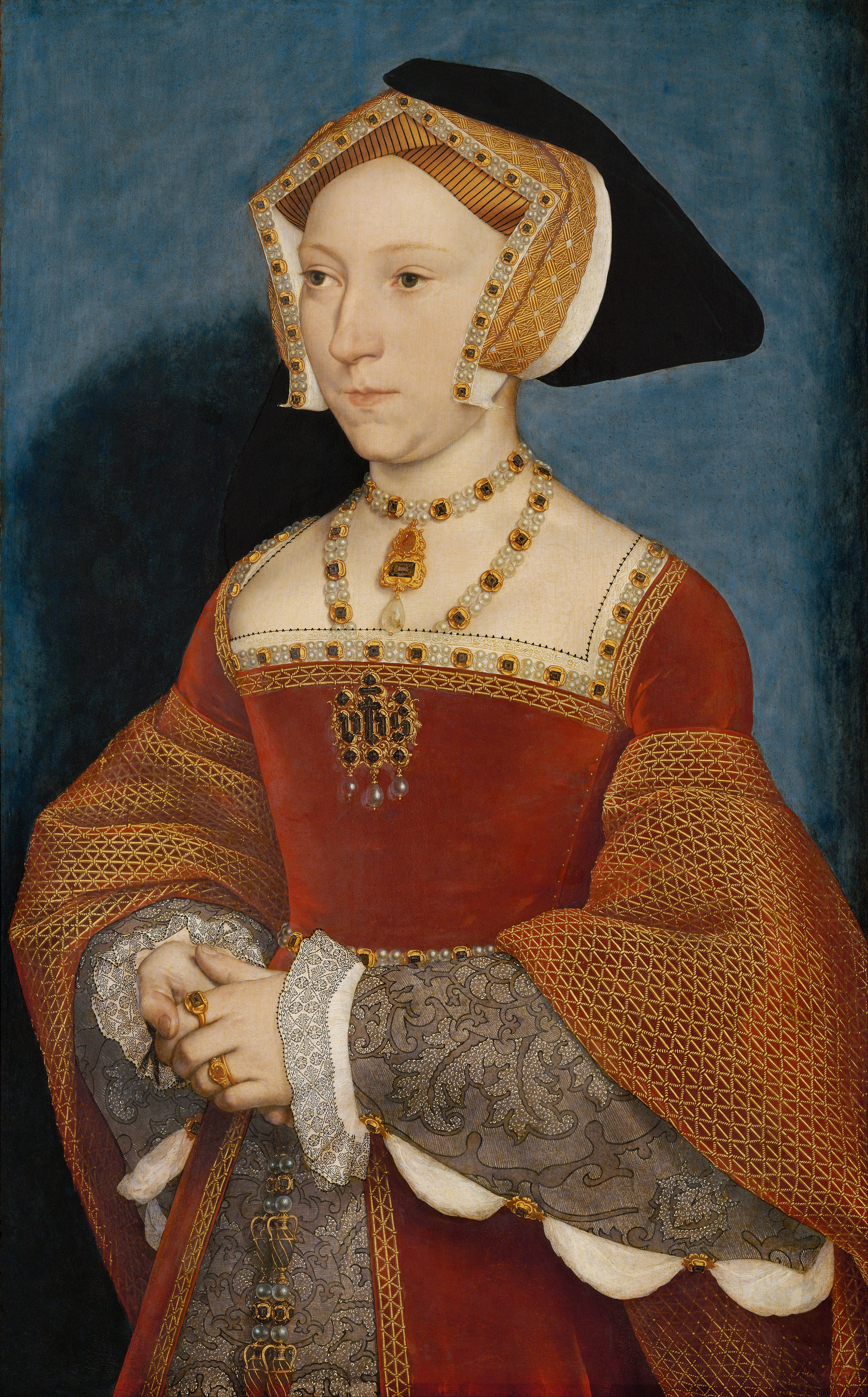
Anne's granddaughter, Jane Seymour.

- Richard Wentworth (c. 1480 – 17 October 1528), Baron le Despencer and Sheriff of Norfolk and Suffolk.
- Edward Wentworth.
- Elizabeth Wentworth (died after 22 September 1545), who married firstly Sir Roger Darcy (died 30 September 1508) of Danbury, Essex. She was appointed to attend on Catherine of Aragon in October 1501. She married secondly, as his second wife, Thomas Wyndham (died 1522) of Felbrigg, Norfolk.
- Margery Wentworth (c. 1478 – c. October 1550), who married, before 1500, John Seymour, by whom she was the mother of Jane Seymour, the third wife of Henry VIII and the mother of Edward VI.
- Jane Wentworth.
- Dorothy Wentworth, who married, as his second wife, Sir Robert Broughton.

== Death and burial ==
Anne's exact year of death remains uncertain. She was last mentioned in 1484, and her husband, Henry Wentworth, married his second wife, Elizabeth Neville (died September 1517), on 22 October 1494. Therefore, Anne must have died between 1484 and 1494. She is believed to have been buried at Newsham Abbey, Lincolnshire, England, where her husband was later buried in c. 1499.

== Royal relatives and descendants ==
Frederick Tilney	Elizabeth Cheney	John Say, courtier
Elizabeth Tilney	Anne Say
Lord Edmund Howard	Elizabeth Howard	Margery Wentworth
Catherine Howard	Anne Boleyn	Henry VIII	Jane Seymour
Elizabeth I	Edward VI

== Ancestry ==
Ancestors of Anne Say

8. Sir John de Say
4. Sir John Say (b. 1445)
9. Elizabeth le Boteler
2. Sir John Say
5. Maud
1. Anne Say
12. Sir William Cheney
6. Sir Lawrence Cheney
13. Katherine Pabenham
3. Elizabeth Cheney
14. Sir John Cockayne
7. Elizabeth Cockayne
15. Ida de Grey
