= Henry Wentworth =

English landowner (died c. 1500)

Sir Henry Wentworth
- Wentworth coat of arms
- Born: c. 1448; Nettlestead, Kent
- Died: c. 1500 (aged around 51-52); Lincolnshire
- Buried: Newhouse Abbey, Lincolnshire
- Spouses: Anne Say; Elizabeth Neville
- Issue: Sir Richard Wentworth; Edward Wentworth; Elizabeth Wentworth; Margery Wentworth; Dorothy Wentworth; Jane Wentworth
- Father: Sir Philip Wentworth
- Mother: Mary Clifford

Sir Henry Wentworth of Nettlestead, Suffolk, KB (c. 1448 – between 17 August 1499 and 27 February 1501), de jure 4th Baron le Despenser was an English baron who is notable for being the maternal grandfather of Henry VIII's third wife, Jane Seymour, and the great-grandfather of Edward VI.

== Life ==
Henry Wentworth, born about 1448, was the only son and heir of the courtier Sir Philip Wentworth (d. 18 May 1464) of Nettlestead, Suffolk, beheaded after the Battle of Hexham, and Mary Clifford, daughter of John Clifford, 7th Baron de Clifford, by Lady Elizabeth Percy, the daughter of Henry Percy. He was the grandson of Roger Wentworth and Margery le Despenser. In taking as her second husband Roger Wentworth, a younger son of John Wentworth of North Elmsall, Yorkshire, Sir Philip's mother, Margery, Lady Roos, who was the daughter and heiress of Philip le Despenser, 2nd Baron le Despenser, was said to have "married herself dishonourably without licence from the King". Sir Philip Wentworth served in the army of King Henry VI in the Wars of the Roses. He was taken prisoner at the Battle of Hexham, and beheaded at Middleham, Yorkshire, on 18 May 1464.

Wentworth was pardoned in 1462, and two years later his father's lands were restored to him by Parliament. In 1475 he went to France with the army of Edward IV. He was invested as a Knight of the Bath in 1489. He served as an Esquire of the Household and a Knight of the Body, and held the offices of Knight of the Shire for Yorkshire, and High Sheriff of Norfolk and Suffolk in 1482. He was High Sheriff of Yorkshire in 1489 and 1492.

== Marriages and issue ==
Wentworth married, firstly, Anne Say (died before 22 October 1494) on about 25 February 1470, the daughter of Sir John Say and Elizabeth Cheyney, by whom he had two sons and four daughters:

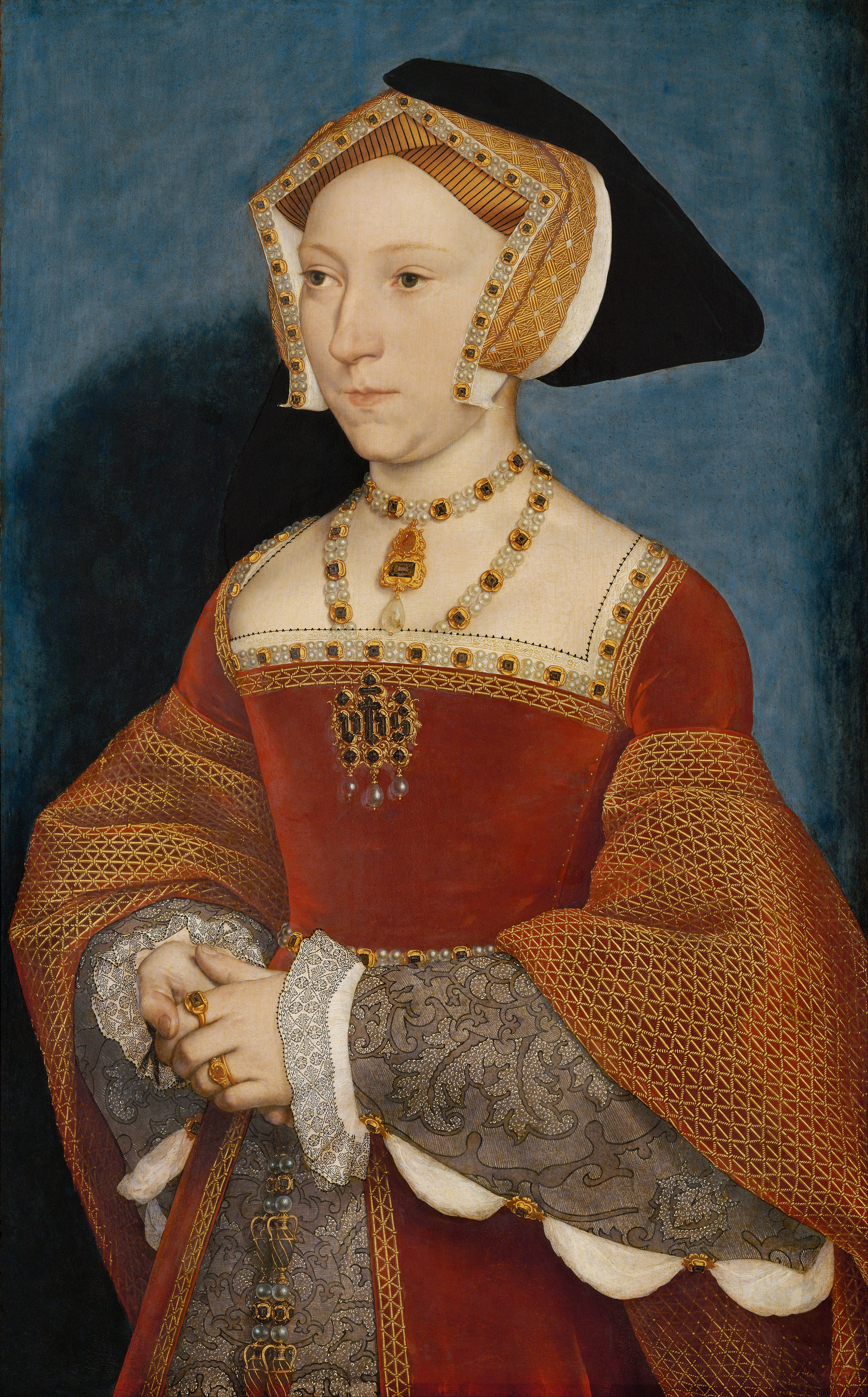
Henry's granddaughter, Jane Seymour

- Sir Richard Wentworth, who married Anne Tyrrell, the daughter of Sir James Tyrrell, by whom he had three sons, Thomas Wentworth, 1st Baron Wentworth, Richard and Philip, and five daughters, Anne, Elizabeth, Margery, Dorothy and Thomasine.
- Edward Wentworth.
- Elizabeth Wentworth (died after 22 September 1545), who married, firstly, Sir Roger Darcy (d. 30 September 1508) of Danbury, Essex. She was appointed to wait on Katherine of Aragon in October 1501. She was the mother of Thomas Darcy, 1st Baron Darcy of Chiche (1506 – 28 June 1558). She married, secondly, as his second wife, Sir Thomas Wyndham (d. 1522) of Felbrigg, Norfolk, Vice-Admiral and councillor to Henry VIII, by whom she was the mother of Sir Thomas Wyndham (1508–1554). She married, thirdly, as his third wife, John Bourchier, 1st Earl of Bath.
- Margery Wentworth (c. 1478 – c. October 1550), who married, in 1494, Sir John Seymour, by whom she was the mother of Jane Seymour, third wife of Henry VIII and mother of Edward VI.
- Jane Wentworth
- Dorothy Wentworth, who married, as his second wife, Sir Robert Broughton.

Wentworth married, secondly, by licence dated 22 October 1494, Elizabeth Neville (d. September 1517), widow of Thomas Scrope, 6th Baron Scrope of Masham and Upsall (d. 23 April 1493), and second daughter of John Neville, 1st Marquess of Montagu by Isabel, daughter of Sir Edmund Ingaldsthorpe, by whom he had no issue. Lady Margaret Beaufort gave her a primer book and a psalter. She died in September 1517, and left a will dated 7 March 1518, which was proved 9 December 1521. She was buried with her first husband at the Blackfriars, London.

== Death and burial ==
Wentworth's will, made on 17 August 1499, was proved 27 February 1501. Therefore it is estimated that he had died between those two dates. He was buried most possibly with his wife Anne in Newhouse Abbey, Lincolnshire.

== Ancestry ==
Ancestors of Henry Wentworth

8. John Wentworth of North Elmsall
4. Roger Wentworth
9. Agnes Dronsfield
2. Sir Philip Wentworth
10. Philip le Despenser, 2nd Baron le Despenser
5. Margery le Despenser
11. Elizabeth de Tibetot
1. Henry Wentworth
12. Thomas Clifford, 6th Baron Clifford
6. John Clifford, 7th Baron de Clifford
13. Elizabeth de Roos
3. Mary Clifford
14. Sir Henry "Hotspur" Percy
7. Elizabeth Percy
15. Elizabeth Mortimer
