= Richard Wentworth (nobleman) =

English nobleman, Sheriff of Norfolk and Suffolk

Sir Richard Wentworth
- Born: c. 1480
- Died: 17 October 1528
- Burial place: Ipswich Greyfriars
- Relatives: Mother: Anne Say; Father: Sir Henry Wentworth; Sister: Margery Wentworth; Niece: Jane Seymour (wife of Henry VIII)

Sir Richard Wentworth and 5th Baron le Despencer of the 1387 creation (c. 1480 – 1528) was an English nobleman who served as the Sheriff of Norfolk and Suffolk from 1509 to 1510, and later from 1516 to 1517.

== Knighthood ==
Although he was knighted two times, on the eve of King Henry VIII's coronation on 23 or 24 June 1509 and later on 16 August in 1512 or 1513 as Knight banneret (see also), possibly at the battle of the Spurs, historians Pollard and Richardson only cite either one of the two dates.

== Life ==
Wentworth served at the battle of the Spurs in 1513 against France and was present at the Field of the Cloth of Gold in Calais, seven years later, in June 1520.

He died on 17 October 1528 and was buried at the church of the Greyfriars in Ipswich, by his will (dated 15th and proved 21 October).

== Family ==
The Wentworths were originally from Yorkshire but a branch of the family had settled in Nettlestead, Suffolk, beginning with Richards great-grandfather Roger Westworth (d. 1452).

Richard Wentworth, who had one brother and four sisters, was the oldest son of Henry Wentworth and Anne Say. He married Anne Tyrrell (d. 11. November 1529), the daughter of Sir James Tyrrell and Anne Arundel. He had five sons and three daughters, most notably, Thomas Wentworth, 1st Baron Wentworth (1501 - 1551).

== Heraldry ==
In Metcalfe's book of Knights banneret, Knights of the bath, and Knights bachelor, made between the fourth year of King Henry VI and the restoration of King Charles II are two differing entries for Richard Wentworth's heraldic achievements, for the two times he was knighted. The first time, for his 1509 knighting, his coat of arms are described as follows:

Quarterly (of four)
1) Gules (red) background, with three Azure (blue) escallops placed on a Argent (silver) bend.	2) Divided into four quarters with the top left and bottom right quarters in Argent (silver), and the top right and bottom left quarters in Gules (red). Over the red and silver quarters is a Or (gold) interlacing fretty pattern. A black diagonal bend runs across this entire part with three Argent (silver) Mullets (stars with usually five sides and straight rays) placed on top. Fretty (on the left), to be distinguished from masculy (middle) and fret (right)
3) Argent (silver) background, with a Gules (red) saltire (diagonal cross) that has an engrailed edge.	4) Divided into six horizontal stripes of equal width (Barry of six), that alternate between Or (gold) and Gules (red). A canton, a rectangle in the upper left corner, typically occupying about one-third of the top part of the shield, is filled with an Ermine pattern. Some of the many variations of ermine spots found in heraldry over the centuries. In the case of Richard Wentworth, the design is not specified

To that, the crest is described as a Or (golden) griffin in the passant position (depicted as walking with the right forepaw raised from the ground). When knighted for the second time, his coat of arms has become more detailed:

Quarterly of six
1) Sable (black) background, with a chevron surrounded by three leopards' faces. Both the chevron and the faces are Or (gold). A Gules (red) crescent is added for distinction in the family tree. A crescent indicates the second son	2) The same as in 1509.
3) The same as in 1509.	4) Argent (Silver) background with three horizonzal bands (a fess surrounded by two bars-gemelles) in Gules (red).
5) Same as the fourth quarter of 1509.	6) Three pike fish in the hauriant position (head up; as if rising up from the water) between as many Or (golden) cross-crosslets. The Cross Crosslet, to be distinguished from similar Crosses in Heraldry and other Christian Cross variants

The crest has undergone major changes, as it is now an ewer, pitcher or jug encircled by an Argent (golden) wreath.
