= Ipswich Greyfriars =

13th–16th century monastery in Suffolk, England

Ipswich Greyfriars was a mediaeval monastic house of Friars Minor (Franciscans) founded during the 13th century in Ipswich, Suffolk. It was said conventionally to have been founded by Sir Robert Tibetot of Nettlestead, Suffolk (before 1230–1298), but the foundation is accepted (by Knowles and Hadcock) to be set back before 1236 (and therefore before Sir Robert's time). This makes it the earliest house of mendicant friars in Suffolk, and established no more than ten years after the death of St Francis himself. It was within the Cambridge Custody. It remained active until dissolved in the late 1530s.

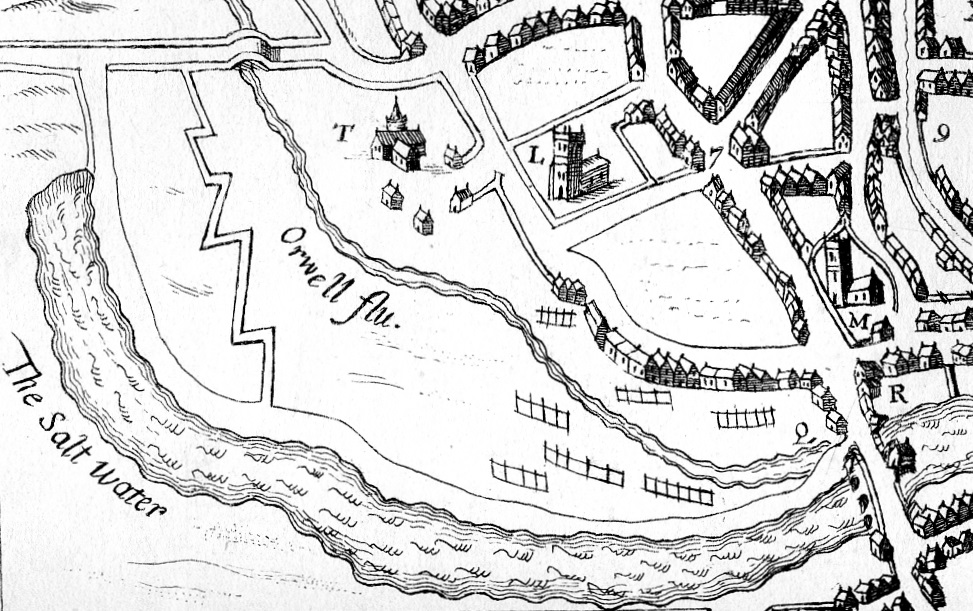
Ipswich Greyfriars (T), shown on John Speed's map of Ipswich, 1610, in relation to St Nicholas (L), St Peter's (M), and Stoke Bridge

Although some of the conventual buildings appear to have survived into the 17th century, by the early 19th century very little remained, and almost nothing is now visible, the few fragments being incorporated into a multi-storey development. It formerly stood in the neighbourhood of St Nicholas's church, Prince's Street and Franciscan Way, on a site opposite the Willis Faber building, with a frontage towards the River Gipping near its outflow into the River Orwell.

Less well-documented than the Ipswich Blackfriars (Dominicans) and the Ipswich Whitefriars (Carmelites), very few records concerning the Greyfriars survive. However its importance among the several religious houses of mediaeval Ipswich can be traced through its association with the Barons Tibetot, a title active from 1308 to 1372, immediate descendants of the supposed founder, as the place of burial for various members of the Tiptoft family and of other noble or titled persons associated with them. By the time of the dissolution its patronage had passed by descent to the Wentworths.

The locality is still referred to as "Greyfriars", but is associated more in popular imagination with a failed shopping complex of that name erected (and since demolished) there in 1965–66, and with the Ipswich Tax Office nearby. Excavations contingent to the site were conducted in 1990, and also in 2002 and 2006 by the Suffolk Archaeological Unit. A documentary survey of the site was conducted in connection with the Report.

== The founder and patrons ==
=== Sir Robert and Dame Eva de Tibetot ===
John Speed (1614) named "Robert Tilbot" as the founder, but John Weever (1631) has "founded by the Lord Tiptoth", and then names the earliest memorial he had observed at Greyfriars ("for I finde no further of it then the foundation") to be that of Sir Robert de Tiptoth and his wife "Una". The son of Henry de Tibetot, Sir Robert de Tibetot, of a family anciently associated with Bramford near Ipswich, had livery of his lands in 1250, and married Eva, daughter of Payn de Chaworth and Gundreda de la Ferté (a descendant of William de Briwere). Eva's brother Patrick de Chaworth was father of the younger Patrick, who succeeded him as Lord of Kidwelly and was the first husband of Isabella de Beauchamp, daughter of the 9th Earl of Warwick, and afterwards wife of Hugh le Despencer, 1st Earl of Winchester. These kinships exercised a strong influence over the future alliances of the patron family of Greyfriars.

Sir Robert was appointed governor of Portchester Castle in 1266 by King Henry III: he became a trusted servant to Prince Edward and accompanied him on the Ninth Crusade to the Holy Land, receiving a grant from the King in 1270 that if he failed to return his executors should have the wardship and marriage of his heir, Payn de Tibetot. Edward I made him governor of Nottingham Castle (1275), and in 1277 he was among the King's Commissioners to make peace with Owain Goch ap Gruffydd. Again governor of Nottingham in 1280, in the following year he was Justice of South Wales, and governor of Carmarthen and Cardigan Castles. Granted wardship of the lands of William de Braose (of Gower) in 1291, he defeated the revolt of Rhys ap Maredudd (allegedly prompted by Tibetot's governance) and took its leader prisoner. Soon afterwards he was in the King's expedition to Gascony, where he assisted John of Brittany, Lieutenant of Aquitaine, in concluding friendly relations with the King of Castile; but upon being besieged by a French army, he had not the strength to withstand them, and withdrew. In 1297 he fought in Scotland, and died the following year, leaving extensive estates in various parts of England to his son and two daughters.

=== From Tibetot to Wentworth ===
A sequel is found in Weever's record that the heart of Robert de Vere, 5th Earl of Oxford (who died in 1296, his body buried at Earl's Colne) was also buried there: and that the tomb of Margaret (Mortimer), daughter of Roger Mortimer, 1st Baron Wigmore and wife of the younger Robert de Vere, 6th Earl of Oxford (1257–1331), was in the same church. Payn de Tibetot, aged 19 at his father's death, married Agnes, daughter of William de Ros, 1st Baron de Ros of Helmsley: after taking part in several military expeditions, mainly in Scotland, he was summoned to Parliament among the Barons between 1307 and 1314, when he lost his life at the Battle of Bannockburn. His widow then married Thomas de Vere, who thus became stepfather to Payn's son and heir John Tibetot (1313–1367), aged only one. John succeeded his father as the 2nd Baron Tibetot when he came of age. John married Margaret (youngest daughter of Bartholomew de Badlesmere, 1st Baron Badlesmere), whose elder sister Maud de Badlesmere was Countess to John de Vere, 7th Earl of Oxford. The De Vere burials at Greyfriars reflect this phase of alliance with the Tibetot patrons, following the death of the 1st Baron. Weever recorded that Margaret (Badlesmere), wife of Sir John Tibetot, was also entombed there; and there were graves of Sir Thomas Tibetot the younger, and Robert Tibetot, Esquire, unidentified.

In 1319 Robert of Fornham left two tenements to the Greyfriars in his will, which, however, was neither signed nor witnessed. The executors brought this before the bailiffs and coroner of Ipswich, who granted probate when two of the grey friars themselves were brought in to witness that the testator had been of sound mind. King Edward III granted protection to the Warden and Friars Minor of Ipswich in September 1328 and February 1331. Sir Nicholas Fraunceys (manorial lord at East Bergholt) granted to them a messuage and toft to enlarge their dwelling-house, a grant which was licensed after inquisition in January 1332, and the friars were at the same time pardoned for two similar grants made without licence. One of these was from Sir William de Cleydon, knight: Weever recorded the monument of John, son of William Cleydon, in the Greyfriars church, who died in 1333 holding the manors of Claydon with Thurleston (Mortimer), Farnham (Montagu), Orford, and Westleton (de Ufford), a rent held from the Beauchamps, and rents in Baylham, Little Blakenham and Great Blakenham.

Elizabeth, daughter of Thomas de Beauchamp, 11th Earl of Warwick and wife of Sir Thomas Ufford (K.G.), was buried here: both died shortly before 1369. (Sir Thomas was the brother of William de Ufford, 2nd Earl of Suffolk, and Elizabeth was sister of his Countess, Isabella.) Weever also reports the burials of Dame Margery (aunt of Sir Robert Ufford), Elizabeth Ufford, and the heart of Petronilla Ufford. The Ufford family connection arose through Maud de Chaworth (daughter and sole heir of the younger Patrick de Chaworth and Isabella de Beauchamp) who married Henry, 3rd Earl of Lancaster. Their daughter Maud of Lancaster, Countess of Ulster by 1343 married Sir Ralph de Ufford, Justiciar of Ireland, brother of Robert de Ufford, 1st Earl of Suffolk (created 1337). Upon Sir Ralph's death in 1346 Maud buried him and established a chantry at the de Ufford house of Campsey Priory and retired into that convent. Soon afterwards her daughter Maud de Ufford was married to Thomas de Vere, 8th Earl of Oxford (died 1371), reconnecting with his Tibetot and Badlesmere descent. The Countess Maud in 1356 expressed special love for the friars minor and provided for alms to be given to the Ipswich Greyfriars whenever one of her chaplains died. She remained at Campsey until 1364, then establishing and joining the Poor Clares at Bruisyard Abbey. Robert Earl of Suffolk (d. 1369) and his son William the 2nd Earl (d. 1382), maintaining patronage of Butley Priory and Leiston Abbey, made Campsey Priory church their dynastic mausoleum.

The Tibetot memorials continued in the monument to Elizabeth, Lady Despencer (daughter of Sir Robert Tiptoft, the 3rd Baron and his wife Margaret Deincourt, and granddaughter of Sir John), wife of Philip le Despencer the younger of Nettlestead (1365–1424), with three of their children. Their daughter and heiress Margery le Despencer (born c. 1397), in her own right 3rd Baroness le Despenser, married (first) John de Ros, 7th Baron de Ros, who died without heir, and secondly Roger Wentworth of Nettlestead, Esq. (d.1452), son of John Wentworth of North Elmsall. Roger and Margery were the parents of Sir Philip Wentworth of Nettlestead. By this means the hereditary patron interest in the Greyfriars at Ipswich diverged from the Tiptoft family name (which continued in the Tiptoft Barons (1426), descendants of the younger Sir Payn Tiptoft (died c. 1413) and Agnes Wroth), and instead descended to Sir Philip's great-grandson Thomas Wentworth, created 1st Baron Wentworth in 1529, who had dealings with Thomas Cromwell in 1538 concerning the condition of the friary and its future.

=== Other early monuments ===
Weever refers to various other notable monuments in the Greyfriars church. His entry "Sir Hugh Peach and Sir Hugh Peach", sometimes taken for an error, probably refers to father and son of the same name. A descendant of Payn Peverel, the elder Sir Hugh Pecche (third son of Hamon de Pecche (died 1241) and brother of Sir Gilbert Pecche, last patron of Barnwell Priory) took sides with the rebel barons in 1265. He had free warren of his manors of Grundisburgh Hall (vested in him in 1270) and Great Bealings in 1285, and died in 1292 leaving them to his heir, the younger Sir Hugh, who died around 1310, when the manors passed to his sister, wife of Sir Robert de Tuddenham. Their tombs therefore belong to the same period as Sir Robert de Tibetot's. The family of Sir Gilbert Pecche were patrons and benefactors of Leiston Abbey and Butley Priory in the same period.

The tomb of Dame Alice de Holebrok (whom Weever calls widow of Sir John de Holebrok) may refer to John de Holebrok (inquisition post mortem 1311) and his wife Alicia (i.p.m. 1309), who died possessed of very extensive Suffolk estates within the sphere of Ipswich, or a near successor of the 14th century.

== The last years ==
=== Lord Curson's monument ===
The last important burial at Greyfriars was that of the soldier and courtier Sir Robert, Lord Curson (c.1460-1535), a very prominent figure in early Tudor Ipswich. Curson was knighted in 1489 and took part in the tournaments of 1494, and was Sheriff of Norfolk and Suffolk in 1496–97. Having married the widow of Sir George Hopton in 1498, he joined the Emperor Maximilian I to fight against the Turks in 1499 while in tenure of the post of captain of Hammes Castle in the approaches to Calais, taking time to visit Edmund de la Pole, 3rd Duke of Suffolk, at Guînes. It was reported that he had attempted to enlist the Emperor's support for a Yorkist attempt against King Henry VII, and he was proclaimed a traitor in 1501, but escaped the condemnation which led to the executions of Sir James Tyrrell and Sir John Wyndham in 1502, and was made a Count of the Holy Roman Empire for his exploits against the Turks. He built the large double courtyard mansion which stood on the corner of St Peter's Street and Silent Street, of which the retinue guesthouse survives on the opposite side of Silent Street. Conservative in his religious views, he fed the flames at the martyrdom of the Lollard Nicholas Peke at the Ipswich Cornhill in 1515, and wrote the account of the "Ipswich Miracle" which brought Katherine of Aragon and later King Henry to Ipswich where they resided in his house.

Curson's mansion stood very close to the house of Thomas Wolsey's father, and adjacent to the Priory of St Peter and St Paul, the site of which, with its church, was utilized by Wolsey for the building of his Collegiate School of St Mary at Ipswich. This overlooked the river frontage just below Stoke Bridge, as the Greyfriars had the frontage above the bridge, where a channel of the Gipping flowed towards the tidal water. Curson requested burial at the Greyfriars in his will, and although not listed by Weever his monument is shown to have existed by a reference in the friary's Dissolution Inventory to silk pillows of Lady Curson, and "a feyn herse clothe yt ley upon the lorde Cursons herse" (the "hearse" being a metal superstructure over the figures of the tomb). The will of Curson's second wife, Margaret, shows that the tomb was removed after the closure of the Greyfriars to St Peter's church (the former priory church), which, following the fall of Wolsey reverted to use as a parish church. Hence it was not seen by Weever at Greyfriars.

=== Lord Wentworth's interest ===
On 1 April 1538 Lord Wentworth wrote to Thomas Cromwell concerning the Greyfriars, which still had inmates but was in dire financial straits. Describing himself as the "founder in blood" (referring to his hereditary patronage), he explains that the people of Ipswich have been giving their charity to better causes than to this "nest of drones". The Warden had informed him that they had been compelled to sell their plate and jewellery to obtain a subsistence, and it was found that Archdeacon Thomas Sillesden had been buying it. Wentworth states that he has purchased the house for himself and his heirs, consisting of the site merely, with enclosed gardens, holding the Franciscan order not to be a divinely-planted stock but a hypocritical weed planted by the Bishop of Rome. He now begged for the grant of the house. A week later Richard Yngworth, Visitor for the friaries at the suppression, made an inventory of the goods, most of which were old, and removed all but the barest necessities to the Ipswich Blackfriars. He also recovered the church ornaments and utensils which had been sold, including a quantity of plate pledged to Lord Wentworth, to a total of nearly 260 ounces. The exact date of the closure is not known, but this marked the end of the friary.
