= Philip Wentworth =

15th-century English knight

Sir Philip Wentworth
- Wentworth coat of arms: Sable, a chevron between three leopard's faces or
- Born: c. 1424; England
- Died: 18 May 1464 (aged 39-40); Middleham, Yorkshire
- Spouse: Mary Clifford
- Children: Henry Wentworth; Margaret Wentworth; Elizabeth Wentworth
- Parent(s): Roger Wentworth; Margery le Despencer

Sir Philip Wentworth of Nettlestead, Suffolk (c. 1424 – 18 May 1464) was an English knight and courtier. Wentworth was a great-grandfather of Queen Jane Seymour, third wife of King Henry VIII. He was beheaded at Middleham, Yorkshire.

== Biography ==
Philip Wentworth was a son of Roger Wentworth (died 24 October 1452) of North Elmsall, Yorkshire, and wife Margery le Despencer (died 1478), daughter and heiress of Philip le Despencer, 2nd Baron le Despencer, and wife Elizabeth de Tibetot.

Wentworth was Usher of the King's Chamber, King's Sergeant, Esquire of the Body, King's Carver, Sheriff of Norfolk and Suffolk (1459–1460), Knight of the Shire for Suffolk, Constable of Llanstephen and Clare castles, Chief Steward of the Honour of Clare.

Wentworth supported the house of Lancaster and was in the army of King Henry VI, which was defeated at the Battle of Hexham on 15 May 1464. He was captured and three days later beheaded at Middleham, Yorkshire on 18 May 1464.

== Family ==
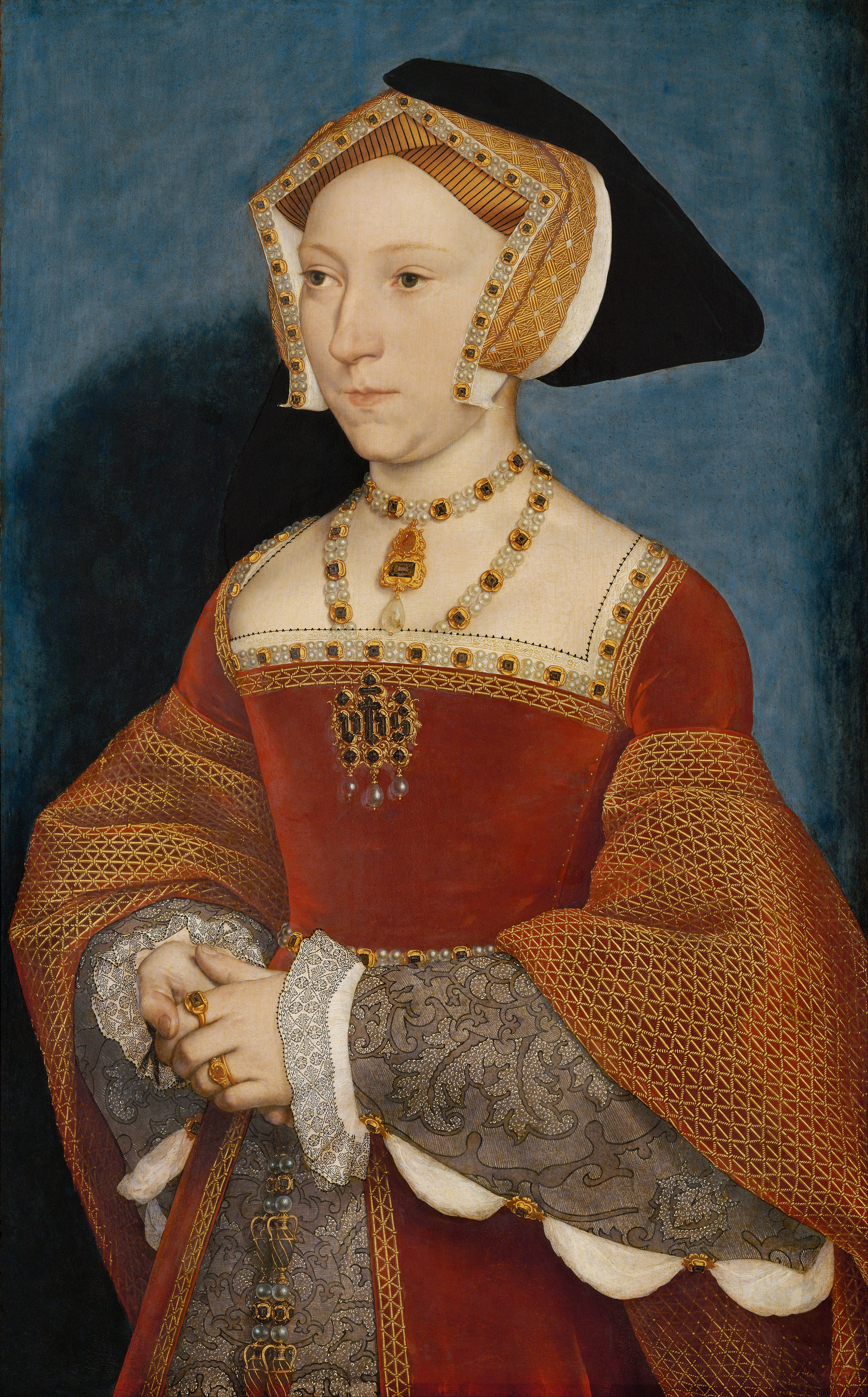
Jane Seymour

Wentworth married Mary Clifford, daughter of John Clifford, 7th Baron de Clifford, and wife Elizabeth Percy, daughter of Henry Percy (Hotspur) and wife Lady Elizabeth Mortimer. Mary was buried at the Ipswich Greyfriars at Ipswich, Suffolk.

They had a son and two daughters who survived him:

- Sir Henry Wentworth, de jure 4th Baron Despenser, of Nettlestead, Suffolk, who married, firstly, Anne Say, by whom he had two sons, Sir Richard and Edward, and four daughters, Elizabeth, Margery, Dorothy and Jane; secondly, Elizabeth Neville, by whom he had no issue. His daughter, Margery Wentworth, married Sir John Seymour of Wolf Hall with whom she had several notable children, including Jane Seymour, third wife of King Henry VIII and Queen of England.
- Margaret Wentworth, who married Thomas Cotton of Landwade, Sheriff of Cambridgeshire and Huntingdonshire.
- Elizabeth Wentworth, who married, as his second wife, Sir Martin de la See of Barmston, East Riding of Yorkshire. They are ancestors to Meghan, Duchess of Sussex.
