= Elizabeth Cheney (1422–1473) =

English noblewoman, Lady Say

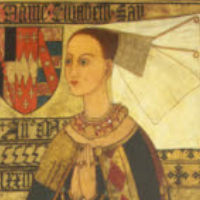
- Born: April 1422; Fen Ditton, Cambridgeshire, England
- Died: 25 September 1473 (aged 51); Broxbourne, Hertfordshire, England
- Spouse(s): Sir Frederick Tilney; Sir John Say
- Children: 8, including Elizabeth Tilney and Anne Say
- Parent(s): Sir Lawrence Cheney; Elizabeth Cockayne

Elizabeth Cheney (referred to as Lady Say; April 1422 – 25 September 1473) was a member of the English gentry, who was the great-grandmother of Anne Boleyn, Jane Seymour, and Catherine Howard, three of the wives of King Henry VIII, thus making her great-great-grandmother to King Edward VI, the son of Henry VIII and Jane Seymour, and Elizabeth I, the daughter of Henry VIII and Anne Boleyn. Her first husband was Sir Frederick Tilney, and her second husband was Sir John Say, Speaker of the House of Commons. She bore a total of eight children from both marriages.

== Family ==
Born in Fen Ditton, Cambridgeshire in April 1422, she was the eldest child of Lawrence Cheney (c. 1396 – 1461), High Sheriff of Cambridgeshire, and his wife, Elizabeth (née Cokayne). She had three younger sisters, Anne, wife of John Appleyard; Mary, wife of John Allington; Catherine, wife of Henry Barley, and one brother, Sir John Cheney who married Elizabeth Rempston, by whom he had issue. She had two half-brothers by her mother's first marriage to Sir Philip Butler.

Her paternal grandparents were Sir William Cheney and Katherine Pabenham, and her maternal grandparents were Sir John Cokayne, Chief Baron of the Exchequer and Ida de Grey, the daughter of Reginald Grey, 2nd Baron Grey de Ruthyn and Eleanor Le Strange of Blackmere.

== Marriages and issue ==
On an unknown date, Elizabeth Cheney married her first husband Sir Frederick Tilney, of Ashwellthorpe, Norfolk, and Boston, Lincolnshire. He was the son of Sir Philip Tilney and Isabel Thorpe. They made their principal residence at Ashwellthorpe Manor. The couple had one daughter:

- Elizabeth Tilney (before 1445 – 4 April 1497), married firstly in about 1466, Sir Humphrey Bourchier, by whom she had three children; and secondly on 30 April 1472, Thomas Howard, Earl of Surrey, who later became the 2nd Duke of Norfolk, by whom she had nine children. These children included Thomas Howard, 3rd Duke of Norfolk, Elizabeth Howard, mother of Anne Boleyn, and Lord Edmund Howard, father of Catherine Howard.

Sir Frederick Tilney died in 1445, leaving their young daughter Elizabeth as heiress to his estates. Shortly before 1 December 1446, Elizabeth Cheney married secondly Sir John Say, of Broxbourne, Hertfordshire, Speaker of the House of Commons, and a member of the household of King Henry VI. He was a member of the embassy, led by William de la Pole, which was sent to France in 1444 to negotiate with King Charles VII for the marriage between King Henry and Margaret of Anjou. Her father settled land worth fifty marks clear per annum upon the couple and their issue before Candlemas, 1453. They made their home at Broxbourne, Hertfordshire.

Sir John Say and Elizabeth had three sons and four daughters:

- Sir William Say (1452-1529), of Baas (in Broxbourne), Bedwell (in Essendon), Bennington, Little Berkhampstead, and Sawbridgeworth, Hertfordshire, Lawford, Essex, Market Overton, Rutland, etc., Burgess (M.P.) for Plympton, Knight of the Shire for Hertfordshire, Sheriff of Somerset and Dorset, 1478–9, Sheriff of Essex and Hertfordshire, 1482–3, Justice of the Peace for Hertfordshire, 1486–1506, and, in right of his 1st wife, of East Lydford, Radstock, Spaxton, Wellesleigh, and Wheathill, Somerset, and, in right of his 2nd wife, of Wormingford Hall (in Wormingford), Essex, Great Munden, Hertfordshire, etc. He married (1st) before 18 November 1472 (date of letters of attorney) Genevieve Hill, daughter/heiress of John Hill, of Spaxton, Somerset. She was still alive in 1478. He married (2nd) shortly after 18 April 1480 Elizabeth Fray, widow of Sir Thomas Waldegrave, by whom he had two daughters, Mary Say and Elizabeth Say. Mary, the eldest daughter married Henry Bourchier, 2nd Earl of Essex and 6th Baron Bourchier, by whom she had one daughter, Anne Bourchier, 7th Baroness Bourchier.
- Thomas Say, of Liston Hall, Essex.
- [Master] Leonard Say, clerk, Rector of Spaxton, Somerset. See Testamenta Eboracensia, 4 (Surtees Soc. 53) (1869): 86–88 (will of Leonard Say, clerk).
- Anne Say (died 1478/1494), married Henry Wentworth, K.B., of Nettlestead, Suffolk, Goxhill, Lincolnshire, Parlington and Pontefract, Yorkshire, and of London, Esquire of the Household, Knight of the Body, Sheriff of Norfolk and Suffolk, 1481–82, Sheriff of Yorkshire, 1489–90, 1492, Knight of the Shire for Yorkshire, 1491–92, by whom she had issue, including Margery Wentworth, mother of Jane Seymour.
- Mary Say, married Sir Philip Calthorpe, Knt., by whom she had issue.
- Margaret Say, married Thomas Sampson, Esq.
- Katherine Say, married Thomas Bassingbourne.

== Royal descendants ==
Frederick Tilney | Elizabeth Cheney | John Say, courtier
Elizabeth Tilney | Anne Say
Lord Edmund Howard | Elizabeth Howard | Margery Wentworth
Catherine Howard | Anne Boleyn | Henry VIII | Jane Seymour
Elizabeth I | Edward VI

== Death ==
On 25 September 1473, aged 51, Elizabeth Cheney died. She was buried in the church at Broxbourne. Following her death, John Say remarried to Agnes Danvers. He died five years later on 12 April 1478. Sometime after 1478, Elizabeth's eldest son, Sir William Say, married his second wife, Elizabeth Fray, a daughter of his stepmother Agnes, by her first husband, Sir John Fray (1419–1461), Chief Baron of the Exchequer.

== Sources ==
- John Smith Roskell, Parliament and Politics in Late Medieval England, Vol. 2, Google Books, accessed 9 September 2009
