= Preston Bissett =

Village in Buckinghamshire, England

Coordinates: 51.963°N 1.044°W

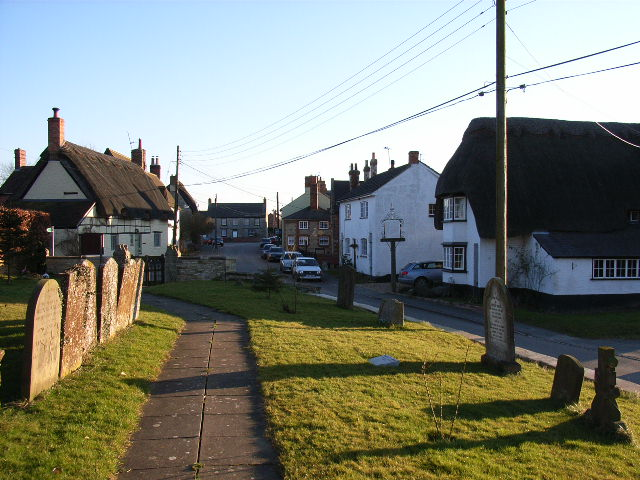
- Preston Bissett

- Location within Buckinghamshire
- Population: 282 (2011 Census)
- OS grid reference: SP6529
- Civil parish: Preston Bissett
- Unitary authority: Buckinghamshire
- Ceremonial county: Buckinghamshire
- Region: South East
- Country: England
- Sovereign state: United Kingdom
- Post town: Buckingham
- Postcode district: MK18
- Police: Thames Valley
- Fire: Buckinghamshire
- Ambulance: South Central
- UK Parliament: Buckingham and Bletchley
- Website: https://www.prestonbissett.co.uk

Preston Bissett is a village and civil parish in the unitary authority area of Buckinghamshire, England. It is about four miles SSW of Buckingham, six miles north east of Bicester in Oxfordshire. The soil is clay and gravel, but the subsoil varies. The parish is watered by a tributary of the River Great Ouse.

The toponym "Preston" is common in England; it is derived from the Old English for "priest's farm". The Domesday Book of 1086 records the village as Prestone. The affix "Bissett" came later and refers to the lords of the manor, distinguishing it from other places called Preston.

The village has a public house, the White Hart, a playing field, a cricket pitch, garden nurseries and a farm shop.

As of 1927, the History of the County of Buckingham described the village as 'picturesque', mainly composed of thatched cottages grouped around the parish church, which in turn stood in a churchyard on rising ground; although it reported there were "a few modern residences" on the east end of the village.

== Lords of the Manor ==
- The manor was held for five generations by the Barons de Ros de Hamlake. The last of these to hold the manor was Thomas de Ros, 9th Baron de Ros, a zealous Lancastrian, who was attainted in 1461, with the manor escheating to the crown.
- Sir William Fowler (MP for Wycombe) was given Preston manor in 1465 for services by his father William to King Edward IV. The manor passed in 1467 to his son,
- Sir Richard Fowler, king's counsel and later Chancellor of the Exchequer for Edward IV
