= William Fowler (MP for Wycombe) =

English politician

Sir William Fowler (ca. 1400 – before 1467?) was an English justice of the peace and member of parliament for Wycombe in Buckinghamshire, in 1431. For the services of his father Thomas to King Edward IV, Fowler was given Preston manor in Buckinghamshire in 1465 (the prior holder was Thomas de Ros, a zealous Lancastrian, who was attainted in 1461). William's wife was Cecily Englefield, a co-heiress of Nicholas Englefield, Comptroller of the Household for Richard II.

In the will of his son, Sir Richard Fowler (Chancellor of the Duchy of Lancaster and Chancellor of the Exchequer for Edward IV, it is stated that William had been interred in St. Dunstan's Chapel in Westminster Abbey. Richard acquired this manor in 1467, so we may presume that William (and possibly Cecily) had died in or before that year.
