= St Augustine's Church, Broxbourne =

Coordinates: 51°44′40″N 0°00′54″W

St Augustine’s Church
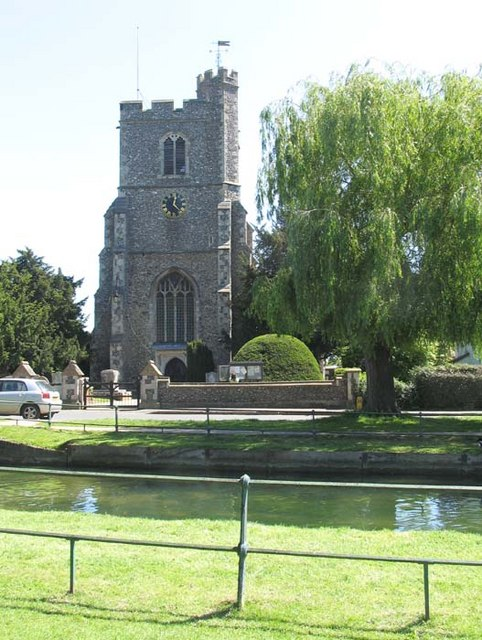
- St Augustine’s Church viewed from the bank of the New river.

- Shown from within Hertfordshire
- OS grid reference: TL 37159 06947
- Location: Broxbourne, Hertfordshire
- Country: England
- Denomination: Church of England
- Website: St Augustine’s website

History
- Status: Parish church

Architecture
- Functional status: Active
- Style: Gothic

Administration
- Diocese: St albans
- Archdeaconry: Hertford
- Deanery: Cheshunt

St Augustine's Church is an active Church in Broxbourne, Hertfordshire, England. The church stands opposite the New River. It is recorded in the National Heritage List for England as a designated Grade I listed building.

== History ==
The church is mentioned in the Domesday Book, which lists Broxbourne parish and its priest, though details about the church building are not mentioned. The current structure is believed to have been built by 1460 and paid for by Sir John Say whose tomb is located south of the chancel. The south aisle of the church was extended by the mason Robert Stowell for Sir John Say in 1476. The church was expanded throughout the 15th and 16th centuries and also contains a memorial to John Loudon McAdam.
