= Frederick Tilney =

English knight (d. 1445)

Sir Frederick Tilney
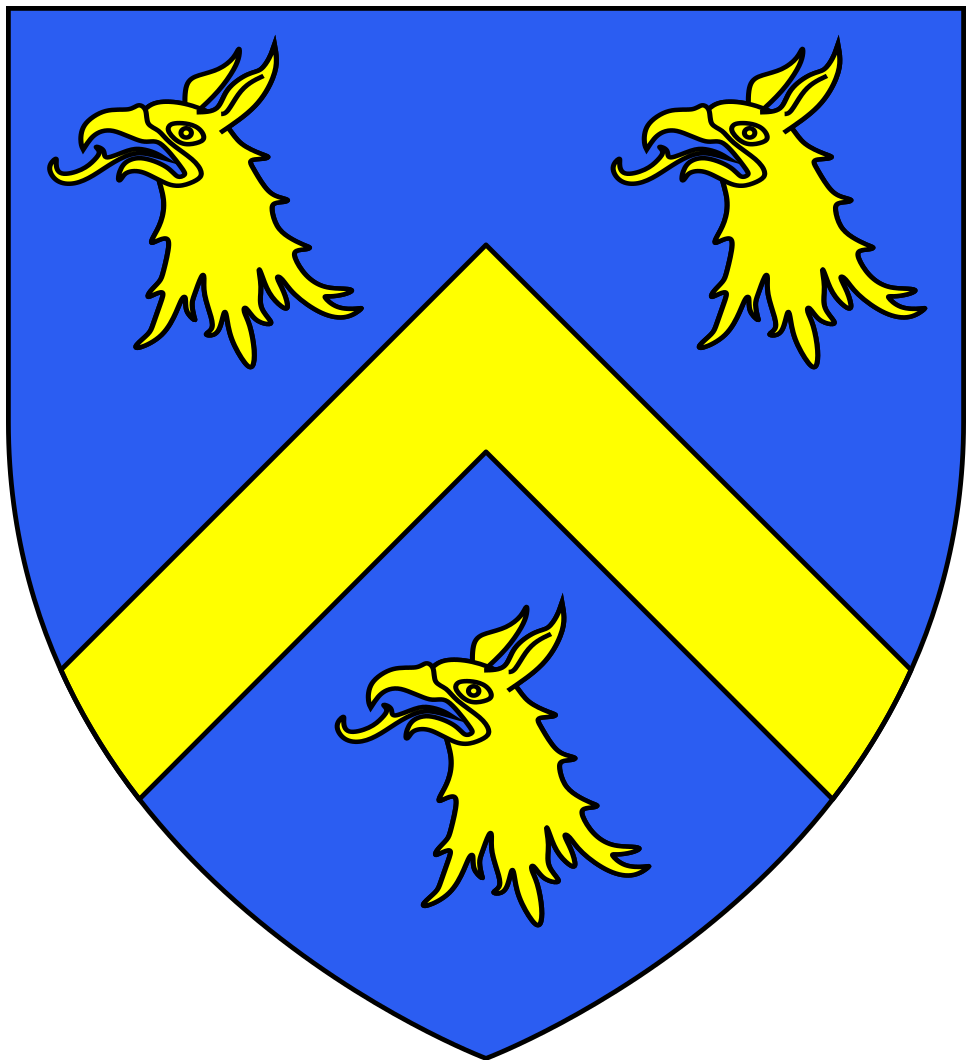
- Coat of arms of Tilney
- Born: c. 1415; Borough of Broxbourne
- Died: c. 1445 (aged c. 30); Nettlestead, Kent
- Buried: Newsham Abbey
- Noble family: Tilney
- Spouse: Elizabeth Cheney
- Issue: Elizabeth Tilney
- Father: Sir Philip Tilney
- Mother: Elizabeth Thorpe

Sir Frederick Tilney (died 1445) Lord of Ashwellthorpe, Norfolk, and Boston, Lincolnshire, England, was the husband of Elizabeth Cheney and father of Elizabeth Tilney, Countess of Surrey. He is notably the great-grandfather of Anne Boleyn and Catherine Howard, two of the wives of King King Henry VIII, and also the great-great-grandfather to Queen Elizabeth I, the daughter of Henry VIII and Anne Boleyn.

== Family ==
Frederick Tilney was born in Borough of Broxbourne in c. 1415. He the eldest son of Sir Philip Tilney and Isabel Thorpe. He made his principal residence at Ashwellthorpe Manor, inheriting his father's titles which were originally earned during the Siege of Acre amidst the Third Crusade.

(This is an error, the Siege of Acre took place between 1189-1191)

He had about six siblings, one of whom was a younger brother, Hugh Tilney, who was the father of Agnes Tilney. Agnes would be the second wife to Frederick's daughter's husband, Thomas Howard.

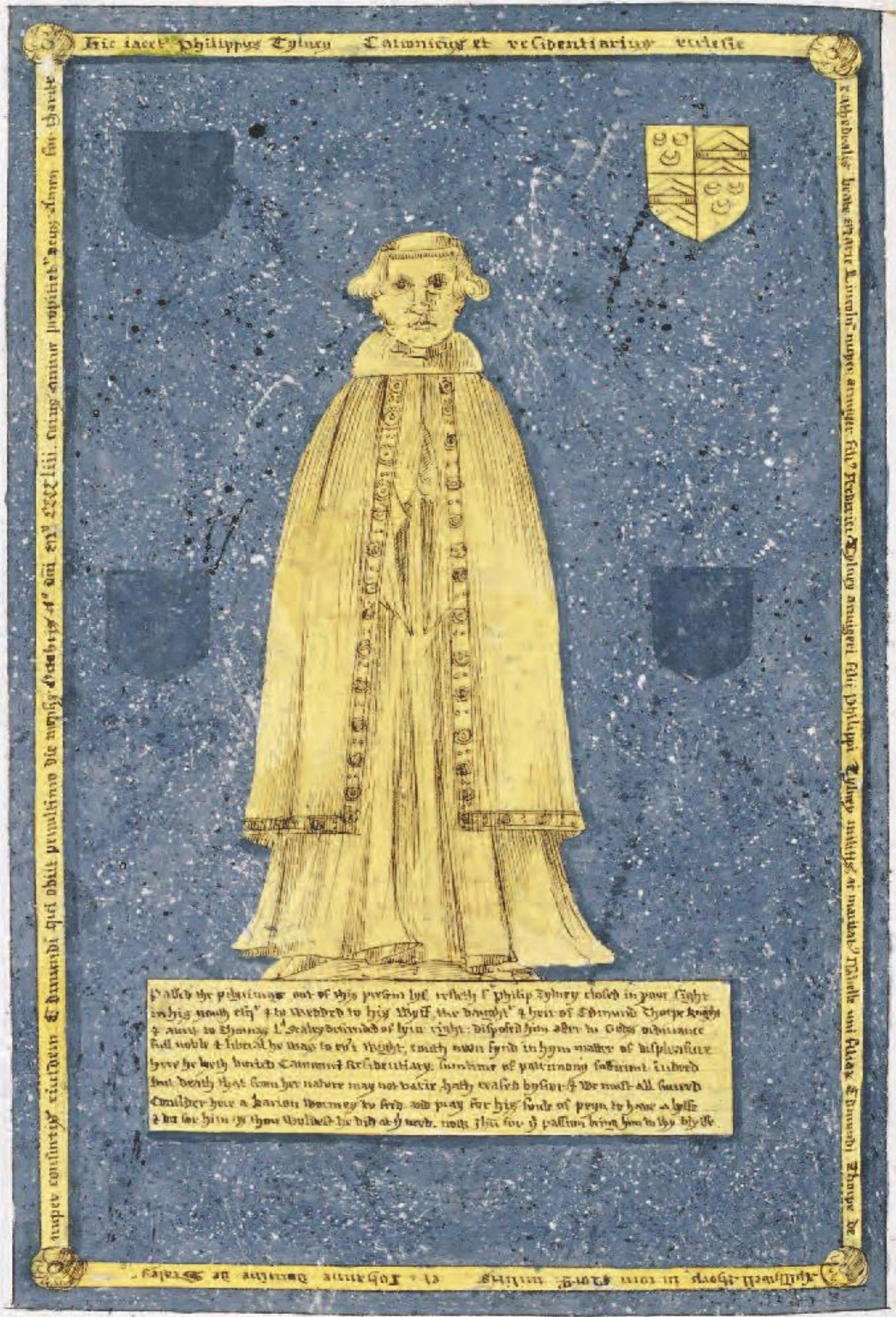
Ledger stone and monumental brass of Philip Tilney (d.1453) formerly in Lincoln Cathedral (where he retired to as a secular canon), the father of Frederick Tilney.

== Marriage and issue ==
On an unknown date, Frederick married his wife Elizabeth Cheney, the eldest child of Lawrence Cheney (c. 1396 – 1461), High Sheriff of Cambridgeshire, and his wife, Elizabeth (née Cokayne). They only had one daughter:

- Elizabeth Tilney (before 1445 – 4 April 1497), married firstly in about 1466, Sir Humphrey Bourchier, by whom she had three children; and secondly on 30 April 1472, Thomas Howard, Earl of Surrey, who later became the 2nd Duke of Norfolk, by whom she had nine children. These children included Thomas Howard, 3rd Duke of Norfolk, Elizabeth Howard, mother of Anne Boleyn, and Lord Edmund Howard, father of Catherine Howard.

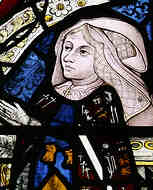
Elizabeth Tilney, only child of Frederick Tilney.

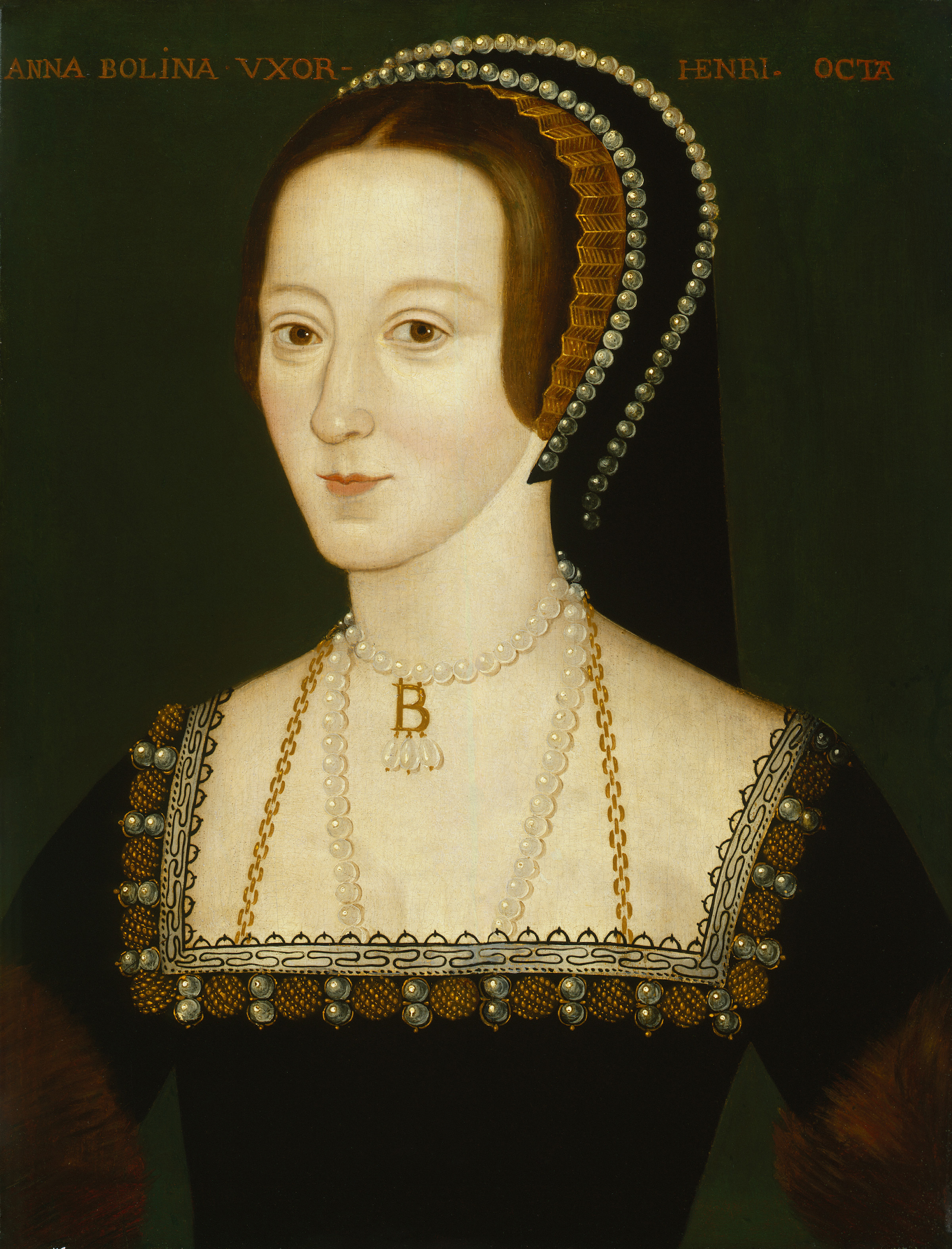
Anne Boleyn, great granddaughter of Frederick Tilney.

== Death ==
Frederick died from unknown causes on c. 1445 and was buried at All Saints Churchyard, in Newsham Abbey. His death left his young daughter Elizabeth as heiress to his estates. His widowed wife Elizabeth Cheney went on to marry again one year later to Sir John Say of Broxbourne, Speaker of the House of Commons, and a member of the household of King Henry VI.

== Ancestry ==
Ancestors of Frederick Tilney

8. Philip Tilney
4. Frederick Tilney
9. Grace Ross
2. Sir Philip Tilney
10. John Rochford
5. Margaret Rochford
11. Alice Hastings
1. Sir Frederick Tilney
12. Edmund Thorpe
6. Edmund Thorpe
13. Joan Baynard
3. Isabel Thorpe
14. John Northwood
7. Joan de Northwood
15. Joan Hart
