= Sulby Abbey =

Premonstratensian (Catholic) abbey in Northamptonshire, England

Monastery information
- Order: Premonstratensian
- Established: 1155
- Disestablished: 20 September 1538
- Mother house: St Mary and St. Martial at Newsham
- Dedication: Blessed Virgin

People
- Founder: William de Wideville

Sulby Abbey was a Premonstratensian house in Northamptonshire, England, founded in 1155 as a daughter house of the Abbey of St. Mary and St. Martial in Newsham.

== History ==
The abbey of Sulby was founded by William de Wideville around the year 1155 for canons of the Premonstratensian order of the Catholic Church. It was originally founded in Welford parish, and was subsequently moved some two miles west to Sulby. The change probably took place in the reign of Henry III., when Sir Robert de Paveley bestowed on the canons the church and manor of Sulby, comprising upwards of fifteen hundred acres. The Abbey was dedicated to the Blessed Virgin. Edward II frequently stayed at the abbey to conduct official business. He was documented making multiple stays at the abbey between 1309 and 1323.

The Abbot General at Prémontré claimed under the rule of St. Norbert authority to tax the houses for the benefit of the order in general and of Prémontré in particular. A royal proclamation of 1306 forbid making payments to foreign superiors. The English Premonstratensian abbots chose Abbot William of Langdon, and Abbot Henry of Sulby to attend the general chapter of 1310 in Prémontré to explain the arrearages. Edward II sent an order to Robert de Kendal, constable canon of Dover and warden of the Cinque Ports, desiring him to permit the abbot of Sulby, who had the king's licence to attend the general chapter of his order in parts beyond the sea, to cross from Dover with his household, horses, and equipments, and to furnish twenty marks for his expenses, provided that he should carry with him nothing contrary to the ordinance prohibiting contributions being carried to foreign superiors. The dispute dragged on for some years, but the question of apport or tallage to the mother-house was put in abeyance.

Richard Redman was abbot of the small house of White Canons at Shap Abbey, Cumberland, and vicar to the abbot of Prémontré, and was hence the visitor of the English Premonstratensians. On the visitation of 1478 the number of churches in the abbey's gift is entered as six, all served by curates.

At the visitation on 28 October 1500 Thomas Wright had been detected in the study of certain illicit books of experiments, apparently of the 'Philosopher's Stone' type. He owned to the study of them, but denied that he had attempted to put them in practice. At the intercession of the superior and brethren, the visitor allowed him to continue at the monastery up to the next provincial chapter, but enjoined on him meanwhile the saying of a psalter.

In 1481, the king's chamberlain, Sir William Hastings, obtained a licence to grant the advowsons of the churches of Wistow and Lubenham, Leicestershire, with lands not held in chief, to the value of five marks yearly, to the abbot and convent of Sulby, and for the latter to appropriate the churches provided a sufficient vicarage were endowed in each, and a sum of money set apart for distribution to poor parishioners.

== Dissolution ==
The Abbey was dissolved in 1538; the property was purchased by William Cradock. In 1567, it came into the possession of Christopher Hatton. By 1869, the property was mostly occupied by farm buildings and owned by Henry Verney, 18th Baron Willoughby de Broke. All that is left are some buried and earthwork remains.

== Abbots of Sulby ==
- John, occurs 1207
- Walter, deposed 1232
- William, elected 1232
- Hugh, elected 1276
- Henry, occurs 1301
- John of Welford, elected 1314
- Walter, occurs 1326
- William Gysburgh, occurs 1414
- John Coventry, resigned 1447
- William Knolles, elected 1447
- John Halley, admitted 1452
- John Middleton, occurs 1487 and 1500
- Robert Goodall, occurs 1513
- Ralphe Armonte, admitted 1534
