= Robert Broughton (MP) =

Member of the Parliament of England

- Died: 17 August 1506
- Spouses: Katherine de Vere; Dorothy Wentworth
- Issue: John Broughton; Robert Broughton; Margaret Broughton
- Father: John Broughton
- Mother: Anne Denston

Sir Robert Broughton (died 17 August 1506) was a landowner, soldier, and Member of Parliament for Suffolk. He was knighted at the Battle of Stoke, where he fought on the Lancastrian side under John de Vere, 13th Earl of Oxford. He was a close associate of the Earl, and is said to have married the Earl's illegitimate daughter, Katherine.

== Family ==
Robert Broughton was the son of John Broughton (d. 1479) of Denston, and Anne Denston (d. 1481), daughter and heir of John Denston (d. 1473) by Katherine Clopton, daughter of William Clopton (d. 1446) of Long Melford. Portraits of Robert Broughton's parents are preserved in the stained glass windows of Holy Trinity Church, Long Melford, Suffolk, while the "cadaver tomb" of his maternal grandparents is in the church of St Nicholas at Denston.

The Broughton family, of Broughton in Buckinghamshire, is said to have acquired its wealth through marriage with an heiress in the early fifteenth century. Mary Pever, the daughter of Thomas Pever (d. 22 September 1429) by Margaret Loring, one of the two daughters and coheirs of Neil Loring (d. 13 March 1386), a founding member of the Order of the Garter, married firstly Richard St. Maur (d. 6 January 1409), and secondly John Broughton, by whom she had a son, John Broughton (d. 1489), Sheriff of Bedfordshire, whose son, John Broughton (d. 1479), married Anne Denston (d. 1481) and predeceased his father by ten years, leaving a son, Robert, to inherit the Broughton estates.

Broughton had two brothers, William and Edward, and a sister, Elizabeth, married to Edmund Cornwall.

The Broughton arms are given as 'Argent, a chevron between three mullets gules'.

== Career ==
Broughton was appointed Knight of the Order of the Bath when the four-year-old Richard, Duke of York, second son to King Edward IV, one of the two princes later said to have been murdered in the Tower of London, married Anne de Mowbray on 15 January 1478.

Broughton was a close associate of John de Vere, Earl of Oxford, and a feudal tenant of the Earl in Ashdon, Essex and Stony Stratford, Buckinghamshire. He fought under the Earl's banner at the Battle of Stoke in June 1487, and was knighted on the battlefield together with John Paston and George Hopton. According to Richmond, a record of the knighting of Broughton, Paston and Hopton is found in a copy of William Caxton's Game and Playe of the Chesse once owned by John Paston III, and now in the British Library. Broughton's name is also found on a list in the royal household books of those in the 13th Earl's affinity who were to raise forces in July 1487 at the King's and the Earl's costs and charges.

In January 1488, Broughton was a witness to a recognizance in the amount of £2000 taken by the Earl from Edmund Hastings to guarantee Hastings' continuing loyalty to Henry VII.

In 1489, Broughton was elected Member of Parliament for Suffolk, likely as a result of the Earl's influence.

In January 1496, Broughton served as deputy to the Earl as Constable of Clare Castle, Suffolk.

In October 1501, Broughton was among those who participated in an entertainment on a grand scale to welcome to England Catherine of Aragon, the bride of Henry VII's eldest son and heir, Arthur, Prince of Wales. After journeying on the Thames to the Tower of London, Catherine was met by King Henry VII's second son, the future Henry VIII, accompanied by the Archbishop of York, the Bishop of Durham, the Earls of Suffolk and Shrewsbury, several barons, and a number of knights, including Broughton.

Broughton made his will on 20 June 1504, requesting burial in Denston church, and appointing his wife, Katherine, as one of his executors, and the Earl of Oxford as supervisor. He died on 17 August 1506. His will was proved 10 July 1507. The inquisition post mortem taken after Broughton's death assessed his annual income at £600, making him "one of the richest non-baronial landowners in England".

Broughton's two sons received legacies in Oxford's will when the Earl died in 1513. The elder son, John, was bequeathed two silver flagons, while the younger, Robert, was given £40. Robert appears to have been in the Earl's service, as he was also granted an annuity of 53s 4d.

== Marriage and issue ==
Broughton married Katherine de Vere, said to have been the illegitimate daughter of the Earl of Oxford, by whom he had two sons and a daughter:

- John Broughton (d. 24 January 1518) of Toddington, Bedfordshire, aged fifteen at his father's death. He married Anne Sapcote (d. 14 March 1559, the daughter and heir of Guy Sapcote.
- Robert Broughton.
- Margaret Broughton (d. 6 August 1524), who married Henry Everard (d. 1541)

Broughton was also married to Dorothy Wentworth, the sister of Richard Wentworth (d. 17 October 1528), and daughter of Henry Wentworth (d. August 1499) by Anne Say, daughter of John Say (d. 1478) of Broxbourne.

Sources differ on the order in which Robert Broughton married his two wives, but his will includes bequests to "Katherine, my wife", indicating that she was the second wife.
