= Tilney =

Tilney and Tylney are surnames of English origin. They may refer to:

== People ==
- Agnes Howard, Duchess of Norfolk, (née Tilney; 1477–1545), English noblewoman
- Colin Tilney (1933–2024), British-born Canadian harpsichordist, fortepianist and teacher
- Edmund Tylney (also Tilney, 1536–1610), courtier to Elizabeth I of England, and Master of the Revels
- Elizabeth Tilney, Countess of Surrey (before 1445 – 1497), English heiress and lady-in-waiting to two queens
- Sir Frederick Tilney (died 1445) Lord of Ashwellthorpe, Norfolk, and Boston, Lincolnshire
- John Tilney (1907–1994), British businessman and politician
- Robert Tilney (1903–1981), British Army officer who served during World War II
- William S. Tilney (born 1939), American public official, lawyer and diplomat

== Places ==
- Thorpe Tilney, hamlet in the county of Lincolnshire, England
- Tilney All Saints, civil parish in the English county of Norfolk
- Tilney St Lawrence, village and civil parish in the English county of Norfolk

== Other uses ==
- Tilney Ltd., a financial services company
- Henry Tilney, a character in Northanger Abbey by Jane Austen

== See also ==
- Athelney
- Thilmany
- Tillenay
- Tylney
