= Tylney =

Surname list/set index

Tylney may refer to:

- Earl Tylney, of Castlemaine in the County of Kerry, title in the Peerage of Ireland
- Edmund Tylney (1536–1610), courtier, Master of the Revels to Queen Elizabeth and King James
- Richard Child, 1st Earl Tylney (1680–1750), English Member of Parliament
- Sir James Tylney-Long, 7th Baronet (1736–1794), English politician
- Tylney-Long baronets, a title in the Baronetage of England
- William Pole-Tylney-Long-Wellesley (disambiguation)

== See also ==
- Athelney
- Teylingen
- Tilney (disambiguation)
- Tylanthes
