= Barlings Abbey =

Former monastery in Lincolnshire, England

Coordinates: 53.2479°N 0.3685°W

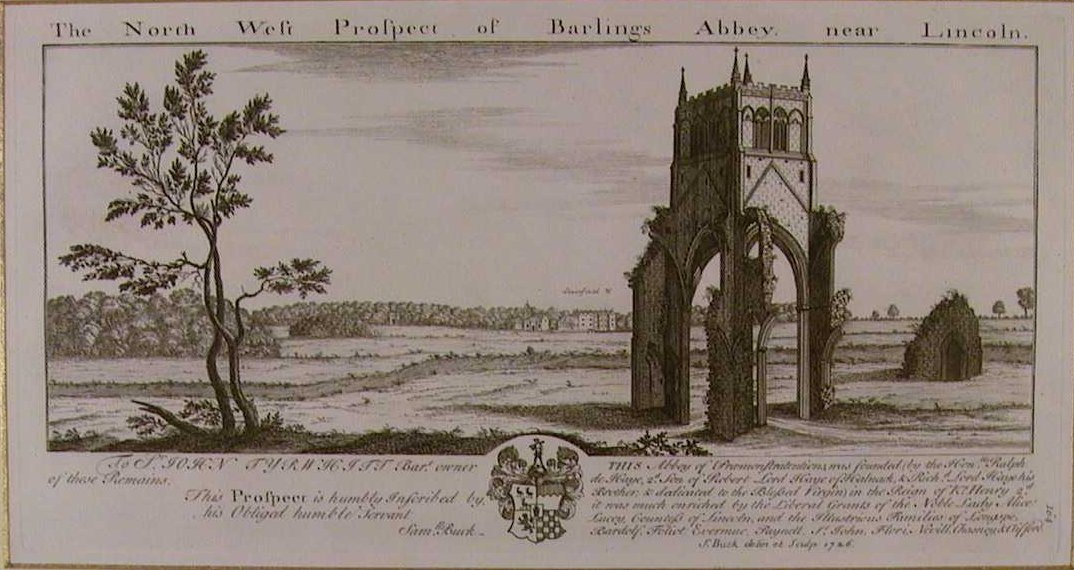
- Barlings Abbey, engraving by Samuel Buck

- Location within Lincolnshire

Monastery information
- Order: Premonstratensian
- Established: 1154
- Disestablished: 1537
- Mother house: St Mary and St. Martial at Newsham
- Dedication: Assumption of the Blessed Mary

People
- Founder: Ralph de Haye

Barlings Abbey was one of nine Premonstratensian monasteries in the county of Lincolnshire, England. It was founded in 1154, as a daughter house of the Abbey of St. Mary and St. Martial in Newsham.

== History ==
Its founder was Ralph de Haye, son of the constable of Lincoln Castle, and lord of Burwell and Carlton. It was first established at Barlings Grange but was soon moved to its present site, previously called Oxeney in Lawress Wapentake of the West Riding of the Parts of Lindsey. Maud, the wife of William Longespee, gave it the manor of Caenby for the support of four more canons, in addition to the original thirteen.

By the mid-14th century the canons are known to have been in considerable financial trouble and even by 1412 when there were twenty-seven in residence, they were maintained with difficulty due to continued poverty and debt. By 1497 the situation had improved with the abbot praised for his administration and the monastery remarked to be in a good state.

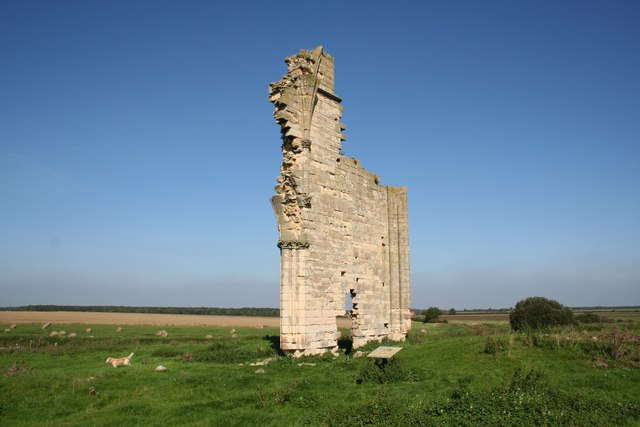
Barlings Abbey ruins.

== Dissolution ==
During the Dissolution of the Monasteries, the abbey became involved in the uprisings against this act and the abbot, Matthew Mackarel, said to have been one of the leaders of the Pilgrimage of Grace in Lincolnshire, and six of the canons were subsequently hanged and quartered.

The supposed complicity of Abbot Mackarel, like that of other heads of religious houses, gave Henry VIII the opportunity of laying hands upon the Abbey of Barlings and of placing it under the law of attainder. The abbey was closed and the remainder of the canons expelled with little compensation due to the activities of their condemned brethren. The abbey church was defaced, the lead torn from the roofs, and melted down under the special direction of Cromwell. The property passed to the Duke of Suffolk.

== Burials ==
Sir John Rochford (or de Rochefort) (c.1355-1410) constable of the Bishop of Ely's castle at Wisbech, Cambs and his wife Alice (daughter of Sir Hugh de Hastings) are believed to have been buried at the abbey (he left a will dated 20 October 1410, proved 14 Dec. 1410, requesting burial at Barlings Abbey, Lincolnshire, next to his late wife, Alice). see Blomefield, Hist. of Norfolk 4 (1775): 712 (wife identified as Alice, daughter of Sir Hugh de Hastings).

- Alice de Lacy, 4th Countess of Lincoln
- Eubulus le Strange, 1st Baron Strange
- John Rochford

== Post-Dissolution ==
Sections of the cloister range stood until 1730 as did the impressive central tower of the church which finally collapsed in 1757. Its appearance was recorded in an engraving by Samuel Buck in 1726. Now only earthworks and one large chunk of nave walling remain accessible to the public.

The main building outside the monastic church has been interpreted as a detached monastic household such as the abbot's lodging. This building was reformed as a post-Dissolution secular residence of Charles Brandon, Duke of Suffolk, who used it as a vice-regal palace. Brandon was King Henry VIII's vice-regent in Lincolnshire in the wake of the Lincolnshire Rising.
