= James Tyrrell =

English knight (c. 1455–1502)

Sir James Tyrrell
- Born: c. 1455
- Died: 6 May 1502
- Buried: Austin Friars, London
- Spouse: Anne Arundel
- Issue: Sir Thomas Tyrrell; James Tyrrell; William Tyrrell; Anne Tyrrell
- Father: William Tyrrell
- Mother: Margaret Darcy

Sir James Tyrrell (c. 1455 – 6 May 1502) was an English knight who was a trusted servant of King Richard III of England. He is known for allegedly confessing to the murders of the Princes in the Tower under Richard's orders. In his 1593 play Richard III, William Shakespeare portrays Tyrrell as the man who organises the princes' murders.

== Family ==
James Tyrrell was the eldest son of William Tyrrell of Gipping in Suffolk, and Margaret Darcy, the daughter of Robert Darcy of Maldon, and the grandson of Sir John Tyrrell.

== Career ==
Tyrrell's father was beheaded on Tower Hill on 23 February 1462, together with Sir Thomas Tuddenham and John Montgomery. John de Vere, 12th Earl of Oxford, and his eldest son and heir, Aubrey, were beheaded on 26 February and 20 February, respectively, after the discovery of an alleged plot to murder Edward IV. No records of the trials of the alleged conspirators have survived to shed light on what part, if any, Tyrrell's father played in the alleged conspiracy. He was not attainted, and his eldest son and heir's wardship and the custody of his lands were granted to Cecily Neville, Duchess of York, who sold them to William Tyrrell's widow in March 1463 for £50.

James Tyrrell fought on the Yorkist side at the Battle of Tewkesbury on 4 May 1471, and was knighted there by Edward IV. A few months later he entered the service of the future Richard III, then Duke of Gloucester. After Richard III assumed power, he was appointed High Sheriff of Cornwall in 1484. He was in France in 1485, and played no part in the Battle of Bosworth Field which signalled the end of the Yorkists and the start of the Tudor dynasty.

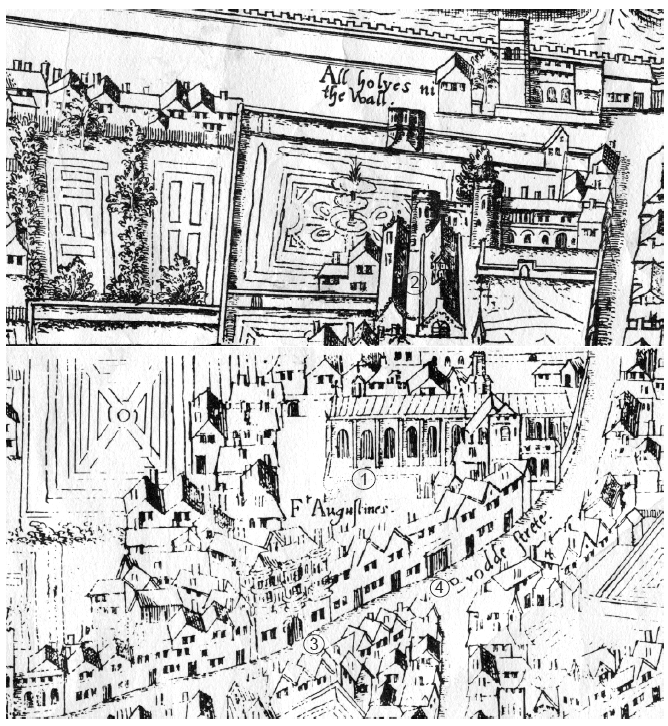
Depiction of Austin Friars, London, circa 1550, burial place of Sir James Tyrrell

He returned to England in 1486 and was pardoned by King Henry VII on 16 June, and was pardoned again on 16 July. Sir Clements Markham considers that it was between these dates that the murder of the princes took place – although Sir Clements has frequently been criticised for his lack of scholarly rigour and accuracy. Henry VII reappointed him governor of Guînes (in the English possession of Calais) in 1486. Tyrrell had previously been granted the Lieutenancy of Guines on 22 January 1485 by Richard III. However, in 1501, Tyrrell lent his support to Edmund de la Pole, 3rd Duke of Suffolk, now the leading Yorkist claimant to the English throne, who was in voluntary exile. In the spring of 1501 Henry VII sent Thomas Lovell to Guînes to arrest Tyrrell and others, including Tyrrell's son, Thomas.

Tyrrell was charged with treason, was tried and convicted at the Guildhall in London on 2 May 1502 and executed four days later, on 6 May, together with one of his accomplices in aiding Suffolk, Sir John Wyndham. Tyrrell was buried at the church of the Austin Friars, London. He was attainted on 25 January 1504; however the attainder was reversed three years later, on 19 April 1507.

=== Princes in the Tower ===
Sir Thomas More, in his History of King Richard III (written between 1512 and 1519) claimed that Tyrrell confessed to the murders of King Edward V of England and his brother Richard of Shrewsbury, Duke of York. According to More, he also implicated a John Dighton as a perpetrator, and Dighton, when questioned, corroborated Tyrrell's account, but neither were unable to say where the bodies were, claiming that they had been moved. The original document of Tyrrell's confession, if it ever existed, was never produced. However, other contemporary accounts, notably that of Polydore Vergil, make no mention of the confession. Additionally, if the confession was ever made, it was likely gathered during or after torture.

Elizabethan chronicles developed More's narrative of Tyrrell and the Princes in the Tower. According to Richard Grafton's A Chronicle at Large (1568–69), Richard III gave James Tyrrell and Sir Thomas Tyrell (who were "brethren of blood") the keys to the Tower. James Tyrell "devised that they should be murthered in their beds", and appointed Miles Forrest and John Dighton to smother them. Tyrell, according to the chronicles, supervised the burials "at the stayre foote, metely deepe in the ground under a great heape of stones". Tyrell reported the burial to Richard III, who ordered that they be buried secretly in another place. Forrest "miserably rotted away" at St. Martin's Le Grand and Dighton lived in "great misery" at Calais.

== Marriage and issue ==
In 1469, Tyrrell married Anne Arundel, the daughter of John Arundel of Lanherne, by his first wife, Elizabeth Morley, daughter of Thomas, Lord Morley, by whom he had three sons and a daughter:

- Sir Thomas Tyrrell (d. 1551) of Gipping, who married Margaret Willoughby, daughter of Christopher Willoughby, 10th Baron Willoughby de Eresby, by whom he had a son, Sir John Tyrrell (d. 1574), who married Elizabeth Munday, the daughter of Sir John Munday (d. 1537), Lord Mayor of London, and a daughter, Anne Tyrrell, who married Sir John Clere of Ormesby.
- James Tyrrell (d. 1539) of Columbine Hall in Stowupland, who married Anne Hotoft.
- William Tyrrell.
- Anne Tyrrell, who married Sir Richard Wentworth (d. 1528) of Nettlestead, by whom she was the mother of Thomas Wentworth, 1st Baron Wentworth.

== Further discussion ==
In a television programme first broadcast on Channel 4 in the UK on 21 March 2015, historian David Starkey claimed to have discovered royal records showing that both Henry VII and his wife Elizabeth, the sister of Edward V and Richard Duke of York, were present throughout Tyrrell's trial. However, contemporary documents originally retrieved by scholar Rosemary Horrox record that the king and queen were lodged in the Royal Apartments at the Tower during Tyrrell's trial, which was not held at the Tower itself.

In his 1593 play Richard III, William Shakespeare portrays Tyrrell as the man who organises the princes' murders.

In 2024, Professor Tim Thornton of the University of Huddersfield contended that a chain belonging to Edward V, and mentioned in the will of Tyrrell's sister-in-law Margaret Capel, was a chain of office, and supported claims that Tyrrell was involved in the murder.
