= John Cokayne (died 1429) =

English judge and administrator

Sir John Cokayne (died 1429), often written Cockayne, was an English judge and administrator from Derbyshire, the uncle of John Cokayne (died 1438).

== Origins ==
Born about 1360, he was the younger son of John Cokayne (died 1372), of Ashbourne in Derbyshire, Chief Steward for the northern half of the Duchy of Lancaster, and his wife Cecily, daughter of Sir William Vernon, of Haddon and Harlaston, and his wife Margaret, daughter of Sir Robert Stopford. After 1372 she married Robert Ireton, of Kirk Ireton. His elder brother Edmund (died 1403) was heir to the family lands and John entered the law.

== Career ==
By 1394 he had become Recorder of London, holding the post until 1398, and in 1396 was made a serjeant-at-law. From 1398 to 1400 he followed his father as Chief Steward of the Duchy north of the Trent, an appointment by John of Gaunt who named Cokayne as one of the executors of his will.

In 1400 he was made a Chief Baron of the Exchequer and in addition, in 1405, a Justice of the Common Pleas. He gave up the Exchequer post in 1413. In 1425 he sat with the Chief Justice, Sir William Babington, on a case over parliamentary expenses brought by the borough of Bedford. It was decided that the expenses of the two MPs representing the town should be borne by all the inhabitants, not just by those on the electoral roll.

He made his will on 10 February 1428, asking to be buried beside his wife in the church of St John at Bury Hatley, and died on 22 May 1429, his will being proved in August. His monument in the church has since been destroyed.

== Landholdings ==
The proceeds of his judicial offices allowed him to acquire country estates, first buying land at Bearwardcote in Derbyshire and then a life interest in manors at St Ippolyts and Radwell in Hertfordshire. What became his principal residence was the manor of Bury Hatley in Bedfordshire, bought in 1417 for 1,000 marks and later renamed Cockayne Hatley.

== Family ==
Early in the 1380s he married a social superior, Ida (died 1426), youngest daughter of Reginald Grey, 2nd Baron Grey de Ruthyn, and his wife Eleanor Lestrange. Of their children, six survived him:

- Reginald, his heir, before 1400 married Beatrice, daughter and coheiress of John Walleys and his wife Joan Turk, and had children.
- Henry.
- John.
- Thomas, a cleric.
- Elizabeth, married first in 1411 to Sir Philip Butler, of Watton-at-Stone, having two sons, and secondly in 1421 to Sir Laurence Cheney, of Fen Ditton, having five children including Elizabeth Cheney.
- Margaret, married Sir Edmund Odingsells. possibly as his second wife, and had children.

Some sources mention Cecily, who married Edward FitzSymons, as a daughter but she was a sister.
