= Richard Fowler (chancellor) =

English administrator and chancellor

Sir Richard Fowler (c. 1425 – 3 November 1477) was an English administrator.

He was the son of William Fowler of Preston manor in Buckinghamshire. He inherited the manor after his father's death.

He held several posts including king's solicitor from 1461 to 1470 (the first to hold this post) and Chancellor of the Duchy of Lancaster from 1462 to 1477, before being appointed Chancellor of the Exchequer from 1469 to 1471 and Under-Treasurer of England in 1471. He was knighted by Edward IV in 1467. Fowler's tenure as Chancellor occurred during the Great Bullion Famine and the Great Slump in England.

Richard Fowler was the nephew of Sybil Quartermain and whilst the Quartermains lived at Rycote, Oxfordshire, Richard Fowler lived at the Quartermain family's ancestral home at North Weston, Somerset. The Quartermains had no surviving children and their estate at Rycote passed to Fowler.

He died on 3 November 1477 and was buried at St Rumwold's church in Buckingham. He had married Joan, the daughter of Henry Danvers, a London mercer. They had issue, including a son and heir Richard and a daughter, Sybil. His brother Thomas (Esquire of the body of King Edward IV) was mentioned in his will. Richard's descendants became the Fowler baronets of Harnage Grange.

He bequeathed money to rebuild St Rumwold's shrine in Buckingham.

== Notes ==
Political offices
Preceded by Thomas Witham	Chancellor of the Exchequer of England; 1469–?1471	Succeeded by William Catesby
Preceded by John Say	Chancellor of the Duchy of Lancaster; 1462–1477	Succeeded by Sir John Say
