= Margery Wentworth =

English noblewoman (1474–1550)

Dame Margery Seymour
- Born: c. 1478
- Died: 18 October 1550 (aged 71–72)
- Title: Lady Seymour
- Spouse: Sir John Seymour (m. 1494; died 1536)
- Children: John Seymour; Edward Seymour, 1st Duke of Somerset; Sir Henry Seymour; Thomas Seymour, 1st Baron Seymour of Sudeley; John Seymour; Anthony Seymour; Jane, Queen of England; Margery Seymour; Elizabeth Seymour, Lady Cromwell; Dorothy Seymour
- Parent(s): Sir Henry Wentworth; Anne Say

Margery Wentworth, also known as Margaret Wentworth, and as both Lady Seymour and Dame Margery Seymour (c. 1478 – 18 October 1550), was the wife of Sir John Seymour and the mother of Queen Jane Seymour, the third wife of King Henry VIII of England. She was the maternal grandmother of King Edward VI of England.

== Family ==
Margery was born in about 1478, the daughter of Sir Henry Wentworth and Anne Say, daughter of Sir John Say and Elizabeth Cheney.

Margery's half-first cousins, courtiers Elizabeth and Edmund Howard, were parents to an earlier and later royal wife than her daughter: Anne Boleyn and Katherine Howard, respectively.

Elizabeth Cheney's first husband was Frederick Tilney, father of Elizabeth Tilney, Countess of Surrey. This made Anne Say, although not of peerage-level nobility herself, the half-sister of a countess. Wentworth was also a descendant of King Edward III; this remote royal ancestry is partly why Henry VIII found Jane Seymour (her daughter) marriageable.

Margery's father, Henry Wentworth, rose to be a critical component of Yorkshire and Suffolk politics: in 1489, during the Yorkshire uprising against Henry VII who had married the female main claimant heir of the former Plantagenet dynasty in order to bolster his own shaky claim to the throne, he left his home and was named the steward of Knaresborough, earning him the privilege to keep the peace in the name of the first Earl of Surrey. After this, he was awarded the title of the Sheriff of Yorkshire.

== Early life ==
She was given a place in the household of her aunt, the Countess of Surrey, where she met the poet John Skelton, whose muse she became. She was considered a great beauty by Skelton and others. In poetry dedicated to her he praised her demeanor. Skelton's poem, Garland of Laurel, in which ten women in addition to the countess weave a crown of laurel for Skelton himself, portrays Margery as a shy, kind girl, and compares her to primrose and columbine. The other nine women from the poem are: Elizabeth Howard, Muriel Howard, Lady Anne Dacre of the South, Margaret Tynley, Jane Blenner-Haiset, Isabel Pennell, Margaret Hussey, Gertrude Statham and Isabel Knyght.

== Marriage and children ==
On 22 October 1494 Margery married Sir John Seymour (1476–1536) of Wulfhall, Savernake Forest, Wiltshire. On the same day, her father Henry remarried Lady Elizabeth Scrope.

Margery and her husband had ten children together:

- John Seymour (died 1510)
- Edward Seymour, 1st Duke of Somerset, Lord Protector of Edward VI (c. 1500 – 1552) married, firstly, Catherine, daughter of Sir William Filliol, and, secondly, Anne, daughter of Sir Edward Stanhope.
- Sir Henry Seymour (1503–1578) married Barbara, daughter of Morgan Wolfe.
- Thomas Seymour, 1st Baron Seymour of Sudeley (c. 1508 – 1549) married Katherine Parr, widow of Henry VIII.
- John Seymour (died young)
- Anthony Seymour (died c. 1528)
- Jane Seymour (c. 1509 – 1537), queen consort of Henry VIII and the mother of Edward VI.
- Margery Seymour (died c. 1528)
- Elizabeth Seymour (c. 1518 – 1568) married, firstly, Sir Anthony Ughtred. Married, secondly, Gregory Cromwell, 1st Baron Cromwell. Her third husband was John Paulet, 2nd Marquess of Winchester.
- Dorothy Seymour married, firstly, Clement Smith (c. 1515 – 1552) of Little Baddow, Essex, and, secondly, Thomas Leventhorpe of Shingle Hall, Hertfordshire.

It is presumed that Margery and John had a good relationship in their marriage. After her husband's death, instead of remarrying, she took a larger role in her children's education while running Wulfhall. Notably, her eldest daughter, Jane, was not schooled in a formal setting; Margery instead had her disciplined in more traditional roles that she deemed suitable.

Her son Edward, a soldier and royal servant, would become the Duke of Somerset and Lord Protector. He was the eldest surviving child of the Seymours.

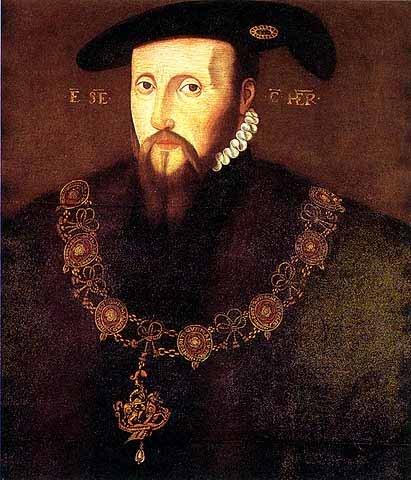
Edward Seymour, 1st Earl of Hertford, later 1st Duke of Somerset & Lord Protector

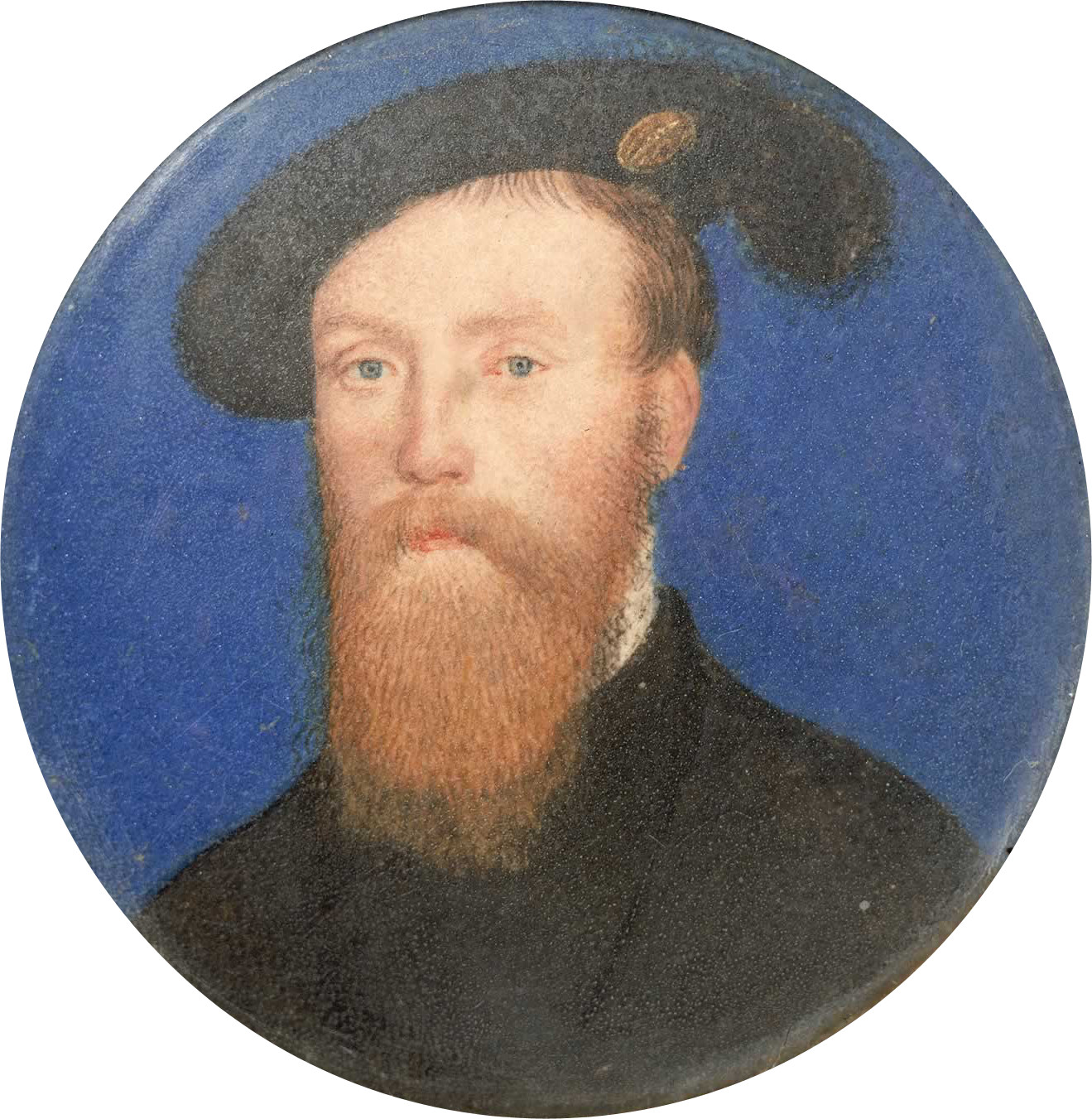
Portrait Miniature of Thomas Seymour, Workshop of Hans Holbein the Younger

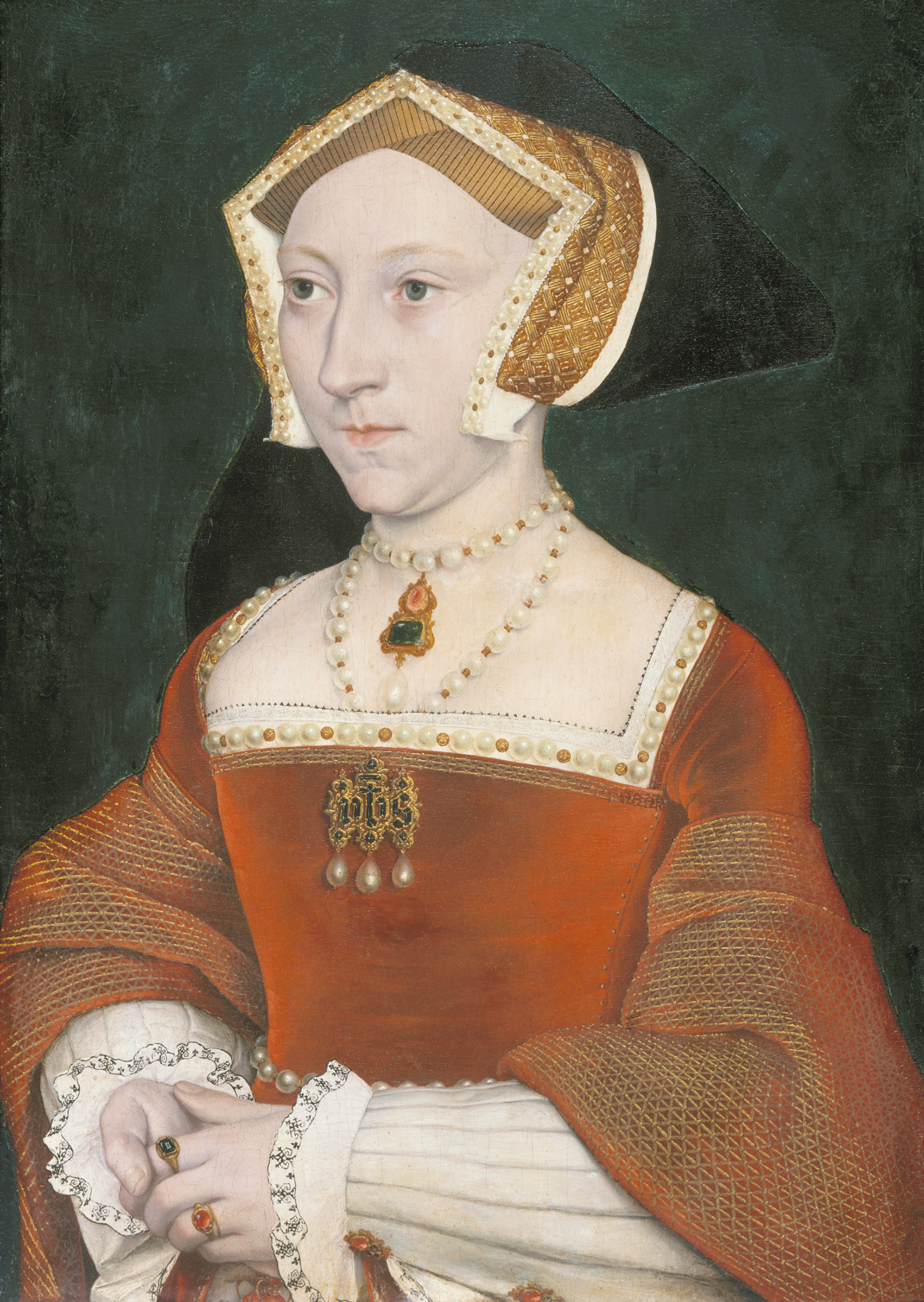
Jane Seymour, Workshop of Hans Holbein the Younger

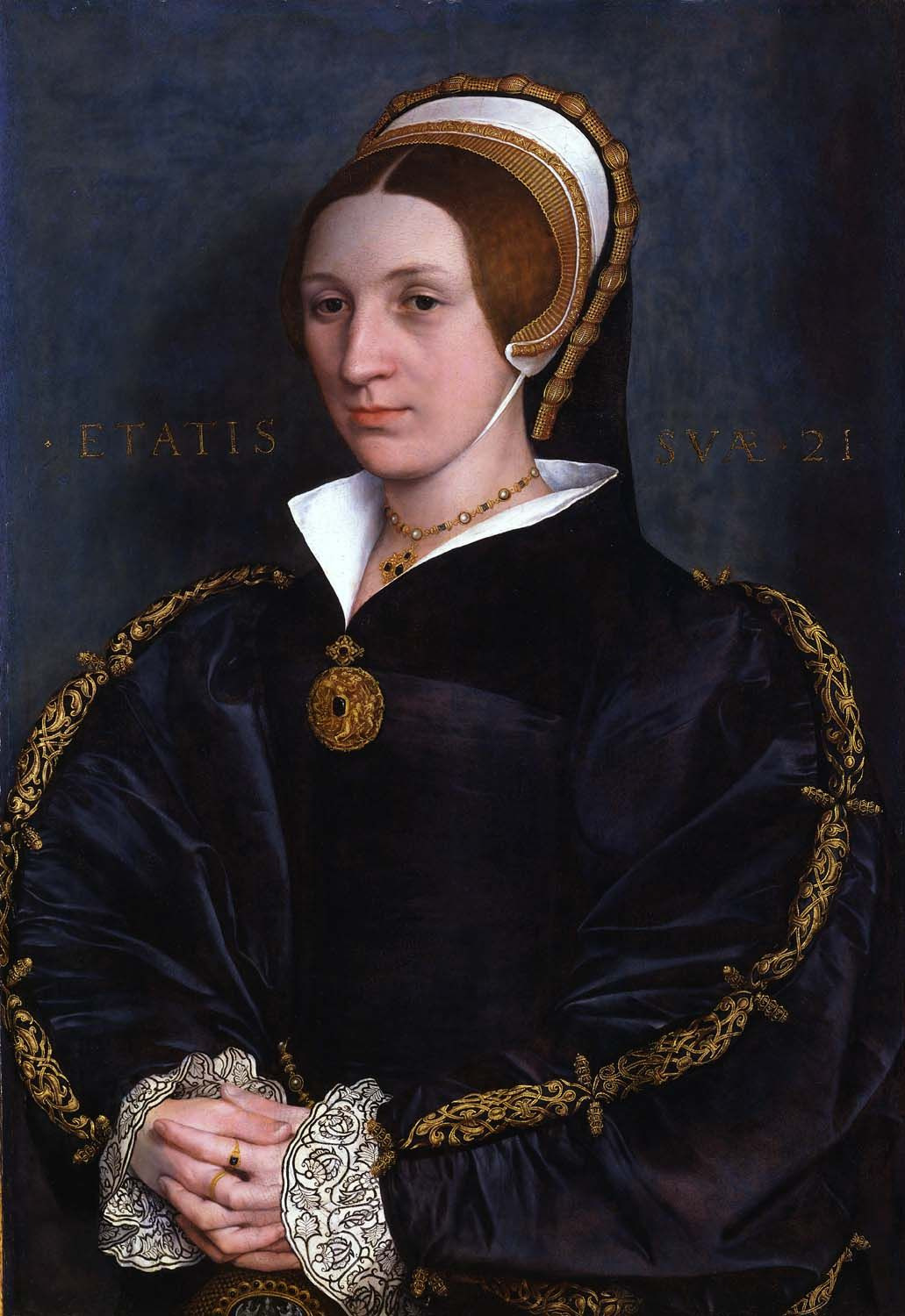
Portrait of a Lady, perhaps Elizabeth Seymour, Hans Holbein the Younger

== Death ==
She died of natural causes on 18 October 1550 in the presence of her family.
