= Ida de Grey =

Cambro-Norman noblewoman

- Born: 1368; Ruthin Castle, Ruthin, Denbighshire, Wales
- Died: 1 June 1426 (aged 57–58); Cockayne Hatley, Bedfordshire
- Noble family: Grey
- Spouses: SirJohn Cokayne, Justice of the Common Pleas
- Issue: Sir Reginald Cokayne; Henry Cokayne; Elizabeth Cokayne; John Cokayne; Margaret Cokayne; Thomas Cokayne
- Father: Reginald Grey, 2nd Baron Grey de Ruthyn
- Mother: Eleanor Le Strange of Blackmere

Ida de Grey or Edith de Grey (1368 – 1 June 1426), was a Cambro-Norman noblewoman, and the daughter of Reginald Grey, 2nd Baron Grey de Ruthyn, a powerful Welsh Marcher lord. The Greys of Ruthyn were the chief Marcher barons in the northern region of the Welsh Marches.

Ida married Sir John Cokayne, Justice of the Common Pleas, by whom she had six children. Through her eldest daughter Elizabeth, she was an ancestress of Anne Boleyn, Jane Seymour, and Catherine Howard, queens consort of King Henry VIII of England.

== Family ==
Ida or Edith was born at Ruthin Castle in Ruthin, Denbighshire, Wales in 1368, the youngest daughter of Reginald Grey, 2nd Baron Grey of Ruthyn and Eleanor Le Strange of Blackmere (1337 – 20 April 1396). She had four siblings including Reginald Grey, 3rd Baron Grey de Ruthyn, the implacable enemy of Owain Glyndŵr. It was her brother's land dispute with Glendower which caused the latter to launch his rebellion against King Henry IV of England and take Reginald prisoner, keeping him in confinement until he was ransomed by the king for the sum of 10,000 marks.

Her paternal grandparents were Sir Roger Grey, 1st Baron Grey de Ruthyn and Elizabeth de Hastings, and her maternal grandparents were John Le Strange, 2nd Baron Strange of Blackmere, and Ankaret Le Botiller, daughter of Sir William Le Botiller and Ela de Herdeburgh. Ankaret was a direct descendant of Welsh Prince Gruffydd II ap Madog, Lord of Dinas Bran and his wife, Emma de Audley.

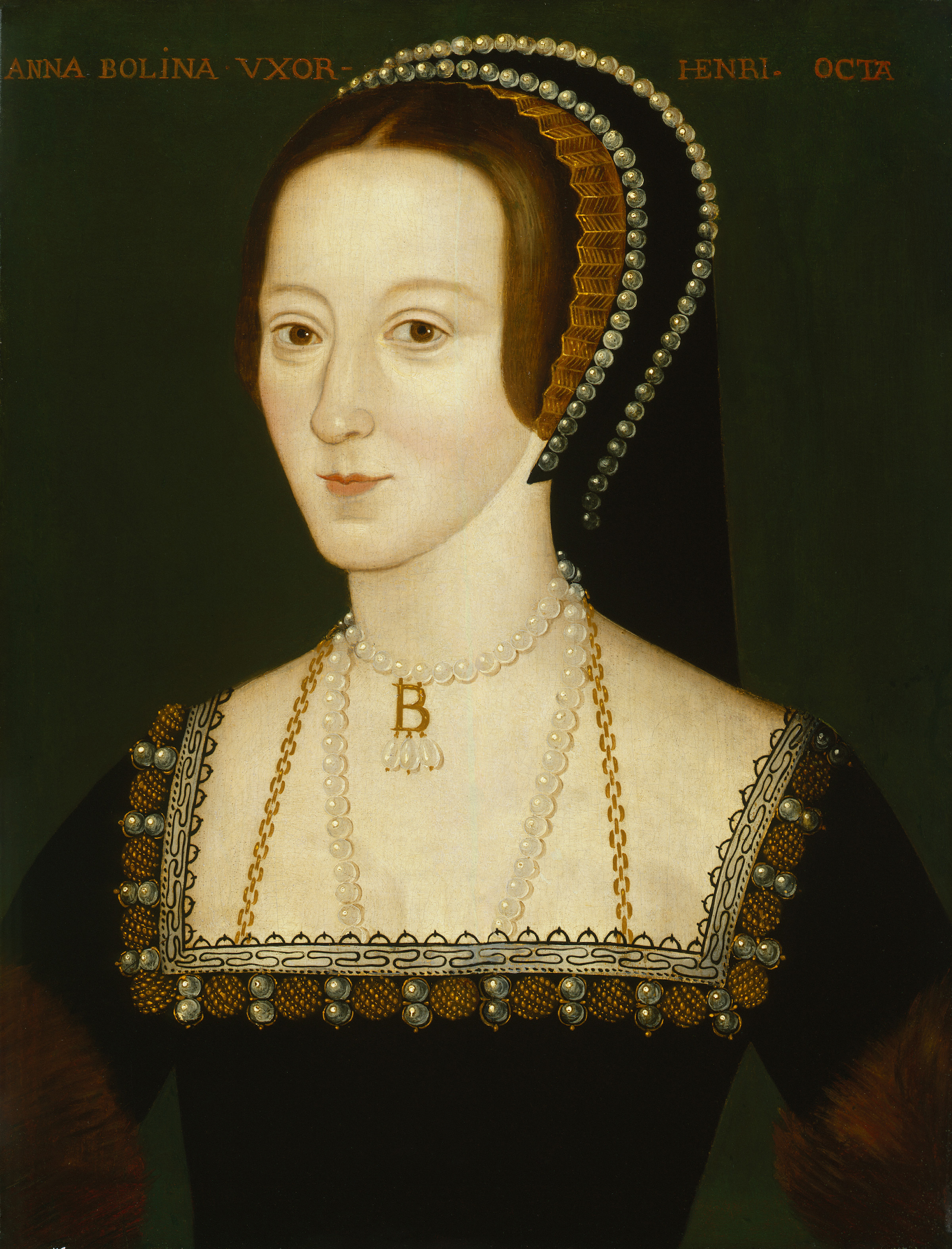
Queen consort Anne Boleyn was a notable descendant of Ida de Grey

== Marriage and issue ==
Ida married Sir John Cokayne, Chief Baron of the Exchequer, the son of Sir John Cokayne and Cecilia de Vernon. In 1417, Sir John bought 1,500 acres (6.1 km^{2}) of land in Bedfordshire which included the village of Hatley Bury, later renamed Cockayne Hatley, and established his manor there. Henceforth, the manor of Cockayne Hatley in Bedfordshire became the principal residence of the Cokayne family.

Together Sir John and Ida had six children:

- Sir Reginald Cokayne (- after 10 February 1428), married Beatrice Walleys, by whom he had issue.
- Henry Cokayne (- after 10 February 1428)
- Elizabeth Cokayne (- after 1422), married firstly in 1411, Sir Philip Butler by whom she had two sons; she married secondly on 13 December 1421, Sir Laurence Cheney of Fen Ditton, Sheriff of Cambridge, by whom she had five children, including Elizabeth Cheney, the great-grandmother of three Queen consorts of King Henry VIII; Anne Boleyn, Jane Seymour, and Catherine Howard.
- John Cokayne (- after 10 February 1428)
- Margaret Cokayne (- after 10 February 1428)
- Thomas Cokayne (- after 10 February 1428)

Ida's husband Sir John died in 1429 and was succeeded by their eldest son Sir Reginald. Ida died on 1 June 1426 and was buried in St. John's Church, Cockayne Hatley. There are many fine effigies of the Cockayne family which can be seen in the church at Cockayne Hatley.

== Ancestry ==
Ancestors of Ida de Grey

Reginald de Grey, 1st Baron Grey de Wilton
John Grey, 2nd Baron Grey de Wilton
Maud FitzHugh
Roger Grey, 1st Baron Grey de Ruthyn
Sir Ralph Basset, Lord of Drayton
Maud Basset
Margaret de Somery
Reginald Grey, 2nd Baron Grey de Ruthyn
Sir Henry de Hastings
John Hastings, 1st Baron Hastings
Joan de Cantelou
Elizabeth de Hastings
William de Valence, 1st Earl of Pembroke
Isabel de Valence
Joan de Munchensi
Ida de Grey
Robert Le Strange
Fulk le Strange, 1st Baron Strange of Blackmere
Eleanor de Blancminster
John Le Strange, 2nd Baron Strange of Blackmere
Sir John Giffard, 1st Baron Giffard
Eleanor Giffard
Maud de Clifford
Eleanor Le Strange of Blackmere
William Le Botiller
Sir William Le Botiller
Angharad ferch Gruffydd
Ankaret Le Botiller
Roger de Herdeburgh
Ela de Herdeburgh
Ida de Odingsells

== Bibliography ==
- G.E. Cokayne, The Complete Peerage, ISBN 978-0904387827
- Thomas B. Costain, The Last Plantagenets, published by Popular Library, New York, 1962, originally published by Doubleday and Company, Inc. ISBN 978-1568493732
