= Newsham Abbey =

Former monastery in England

Coordinates: 53.604284°N 0.298081°W

- Interactive map of Newsham Abbey

Monastery information
- Order: Premonstratensian
- Established: 1143
- Disestablished: 1536
- Dedication: St Mary and St Martial

Newsham Abbey

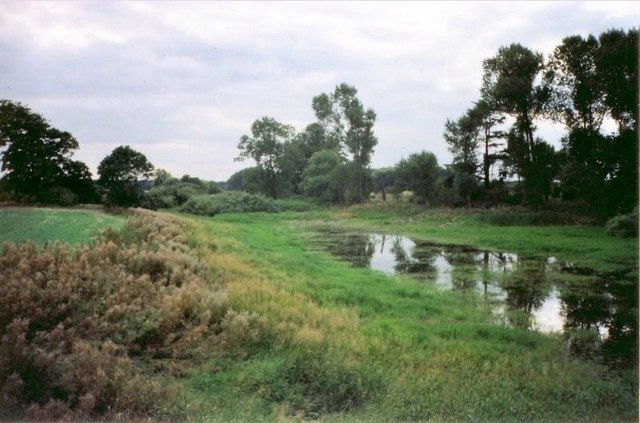
Pond near site of Newsham Abbey

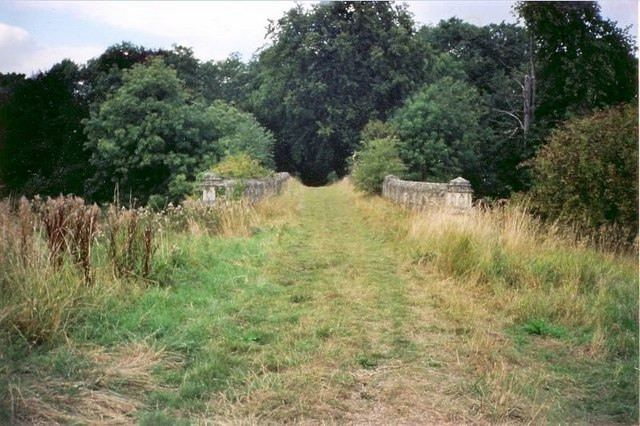
Bridge leading to site of the Abbey

Newsham Abbey was an abbey in Newsham, a small hamlet north of Brocklesby village in Lincolnshire, England, and one of nine within the historical county. Founded by Peter of Gousla in 1143, Newsham was a daughter house of the Abbey of Licques, near Calais, and the first Premonstratensian house established in England.

== History ==
Founded in 1143, the Abbey of St Mary and St Martial at Newsham (or Newhouse) was the first Premonstratensian house established in England.

== Foundation ==
It was founded by Peter of Gousla, who held in Newsham one knight's fee of Ralf de Bayeux, with the consent of his lord. It was populated with a colony from Liegues Abbey, near Calais, France, then under the rule of Abbot Henry. On their arrival in England the White Canons were hospitably received by William, Earl of Lincoln, who confirmed the donations made to Gelro, the first Abbot of Newhouse, by Peter of Goxhill, by Ralph de Halton, and Geoffrey de Tours. William de Romara, earl of Lincoln, and Elias d'Albini were also benefactors of the monastery.

Bishop Alexander of Lincoln and his successor, Robert de Chesney, issued confirmation charters and took the new monastery into their protection.

The abbey was a daughter house of the abbey of Lisques, near Calais, and was parent of eleven others, including Barlings, Tupholme, and Newbo.

In 1385 the canons complained of poverty and heavy burdens of hospitality, and recent storms had almost reduced the monastic buildings to ruins.

In 1472 the abbot was censured for not providing an abbot for the daughterhouse of Alnwick.

== Abbots ==
The names of twenty-six abbots of Newsham are known, the last being Thomas Harpham, who was abbot from 1534 to the suppression of the abbey by Henry VIII.

- Gerlo, (fn. 33) first abbot, 1143–60
- Amblardus, (fn. 34) occurs 1177
- David, (fn. 35) occurs 1177-83
- Gervase (fn. 36)
- Adam, (fn. 37) occurs 1199
- Lambert, (fn. 38) occurs 1200-03
- Walter (fn. 39)
- Geoffrey, (fn. 40) occurs 1219
- Osbert, (fn. 41) occurs 1226-30
- Thomas, (fn. 42) occurs 1242-75
- John de Cave, (fn. 43) occurs 1278-94
- Thomas de Hedon, (fn. 44) elected 1296, occurs to 1310
- Ralf, (fn. 45) occurs 1327
- Alan, (fn. 46) elected 1334, occurs to 1354
- Robert of Thornton, (fn. 47) elected 1355
- William of Teleby, (fn. 48) occurs 1377-83
- Hugh, (fn. 49) occurs 1395-1419
- Henry of Limber, (fn. 50) elected 1420, occurs to 1435
- Robert, (fn. 51) occurs 1446-62
- Thomas Ashton, (fn. 52) occurs 1475, resigned 1478
- John Swift, (fn. 53) elected 1478, resigned 1497
- William Sawndalle, (fn. 54) elected 1497, occurs to 1503
- Thomas, (fn. 55) resigned after 1503
- John Max, (fn. 56) occurs 1518
- Christopher Lord, (fn. 57) occurs 1522 and 1529, died 1534
- Thomas Doncaster or Harpham, (fn. 58) last abbot, elected 1534

== Spread of the Order ==
Beyond Lincolnshire, Newhouse had an important role, in time becoming the mother-house of eleven of the Premonstratensian houses throughout England. Between 1147 and 1200 some 100 canons left Newsham to colonise new houses in England. The following list gives in alphabetical order the names and dates of foundations of the Premonstratensian (Norbertine) abbeys, made from the Abbey of Newhouse and existing in England at the time of the Reformation:

- Alnwick Abbey, Northumberland, this was the first foundation made from Newhouse (1147);
- Barlings Abbey, near Lincoln (1154);
- Beeleigh Abbey (Bileigh Abbey, once Maldon Abbey), near Maldon, Essex (1180);
- Coverham Abbey, North Yorkshire (originally established at Swainby, 1190);
- Croxton Abbey, near Melton Mowbray, Leicestershire (1163);
- Dale (Stanley Park) Abbey, Derbyshire (1204);
- Easby Abbey (Abbey of St Agatha) at Easby, near Richmond, Yorkshire (1152);
- Newbo Abbey, near Sedgebrook, Lincolnshire (1198);
- Sulby Abbey, Northamptonshire (originally established at Welford) (1155).

== Burials ==
- Philip le Despencer, 1st Baron le Despencer and wife Elizabeth Spencer Despencer
- Joan Cobham, mother of Philip le Despencer, 1st Baron le Despencer (daughter of John de Cobham, 2nd Baron Cobham (of Kent))
- Sir Henry Wentworth

== Suppression ==
It was suppressed in 1536, and the site was incorporated into a landscape park by Capability Brown during the 18th century. Parts of the abbey including the precinct boundary are visible as earthworks, and there is a heavy scatter of building material, and grassed-over foundations.
