= John Say =

English politician (1415–1478)

Sir John Say

Speaker of the House of Commons of England
- In office 1449–1449
- Preceded by: Sir William Tresham
- Succeeded by: Sir John Popham

Speaker of the House of Commons of England
- In office 1463–1468
- Preceded by: Sir James Strangeways
- Succeeded by: Unknown

Personal details
- Born: 1415 Podington, Bedfordshire, England
- Died: 12 April 1478 (aged 62–63)
- Resting place: Broxbourne, Hertfordshire, England
- Spouse: Elizabeth Cheney, Lady Say

Sir John Say (1415 – 12 April 1478) was an English courtier, MP and Speaker of the House of Commons.

== Life ==
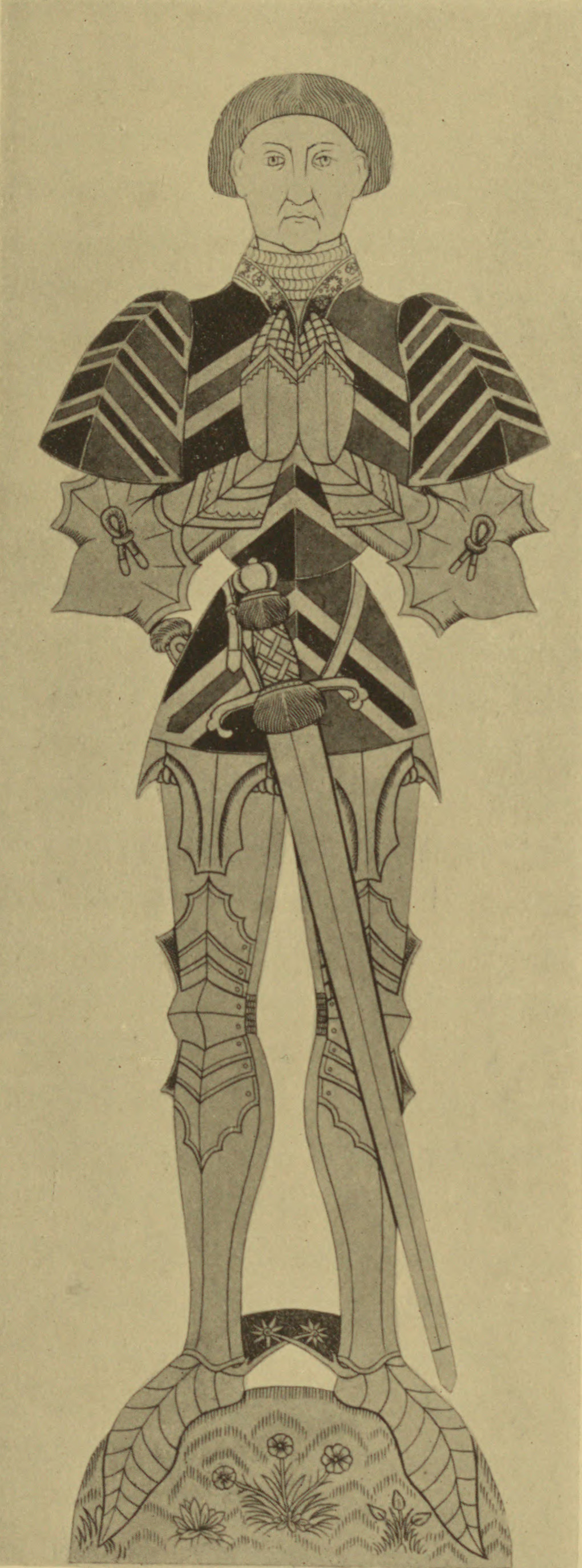
Brass of Sir John Say in Broxbourne Church, Hertfordshire

He was the son of John Say and his wife Maud. His brother, [Master] William Say, was Dean of the Chapel Royal, Master of the Hospital of St Anthony, London and Dean of St Paul's. Sir John owned land at Baas, Broxbourne, Little Berkhamsted and Sawbridgeworth, Hertfordshire, and Lawford, Essex

Sir John Say trained as a lawyer and became a King's Serjeant, Coroner of the Marshalsea, Yeoman of the Chamber and Crown, Keeper of Westminster Palace, Squire of the Body and Privy Councillor.

In 1447 he entered Parliament as MP for Cambridge and was then in 1449 elected Knight of the Shire for Cambridgeshire, when he was also elected Speaker of the House of Commons. In June 1449 he was made Chancellor of the Duchy of Lancaster and in 1449 was appointed sheriff of Norfolk and Suffolk. By 1450, he was out of favour and in 1451 the Commons demanded his banishment from the court. However, he was pardoned in 1452.

From 1453 to 1478 he represented Hertfordshire in several Parliaments and was chosen to serve as speaker from 1463 to 1465 and again 1467 to 1468. In 1455 (until 1478 in three terms under Henry Bourchier, 1st Viscount Bourchier, 1st Earl of Essex) he held the post of under-Treasurer of the Exchequer and from 1476 that of Keeper of the Great Wardrobe.

He was made Knight of the Bath in 1465.

He died on 12 April 1478.

== Marriage ==
He married (1st) about 11 November 1446 (grant of the king) Elizabeth, widow of Sir Frederick Tilney of Ashwellthorpe, Norfolk, and daughter of Sir Laurence or Lawrence Cheney (or Cheyne), Esq. (c. 1396 – 1461), of Fen Ditton, Fen Drayton, and Long Stanton, Cambridgeshire, Eaton (in Eaton Socon) and Pavenham, Bedfordshire, Irchester, Northamptonshire, etc., Sheriff of Cambridgeshire and Huntingdonshire, 1429–30, 1435–6, Knight of the Shire for Cambridgeshire, 1431, 1432, 1435, 1442, by Elizabeth, daughter of John Cokayne, of Berwardecote, Brunaldeston, and Hatton, Derbyshire, Chief Baron of the Exchequer, 1401, Justice of the Common Pleas, 1405–29, Chief Steward of the Duchy of Lancaster (Northern parts). His wife, Elizabeth, died 2 September 1473. The couple had issue, including:

- Anne Say, who married Sir Henry Wentworth of Nettlestead, de jure 4th Baron Despenser
- Mary Say
- Elizabeth Saye

Say married (2nd) before 9 October 1474 Agnes Danvers, widow successively of John Fray, Knt., Chief Baron of Exchequer, and John Wenlock, K.G., Lord Wenlock, Speaker of the House of Commons, Chief Butler of England, Chamberlain of the Duchy of Lancaster, joint Treasurer of Ireland, Lieutenant of Calais, and daughter of John Danvers, Knt., Ipswell and Colthorpe, Oxfordshire.

== Death ==
Sir John and Lady Elizabeth Say are buried together at Broxbourne, Hertfordshire. Say had contracted the mason Robert Stowell to extend the south aisle of St Augustine's Church and prepare a tomb in June 1476.

They were survived by seven of their eight children (three sons and four daughters). Sir John Say was an ancestor of Jane Seymour, third wife of King Henry VIII. He was succeeded by his son William, who also became an MP and Sheriff for Hertfordshire.

Political offices
Preceded by Sir William Tresham	Speaker of the House of Commons; 1449	Succeeded by Sir John Popham
Preceded by Sir James Strangeways	Speaker of the House of Commons; 1463-1468	Succeeded by Unknown
Preceded by William Tresham	Chancellor of the Duchy of Lancaster; 1449–1462	Succeeded by Richard Fowler
Preceded by Richard Fowler	Chancellor of the Duchy of Lancaster; 1477–1478	Succeeded by Thomas Thwaites
