= Reynold Grey, 2nd Baron Grey of Ruthin =

English politician

- Arms of Grey de Ruthyn: Barry of six argent and azure in chief three torteaux

Member of Parliament
- In office 1354-1388

Personal details
- Born: c. 1322
- Died: c. 4 August 1388 (aged 65–66)
- Spouse: Alianore Lestrange
- Children: 5, including Reynold and Ida
- Parent: Roger Grey (father)
- Relatives: John Grey (grandfather); John Hastings (grandfather)

Reynold Grey, 2nd Baron Grey of Ruthin (c. 1322 – c. 4 August 1388) was the son of Roger Grey, 1st Baron Grey de Ruthyn and Elizabeth de Hastings. He was summoned to Parliament from 1354 to 1388.

== Marriage and children ==
He succeeded his father and was succeeded by his son, Reginald. By his wife Alianore Lestrange he had five children:

1. Reynold Grey, 3rd Baron Grey of Ruthin (c. 1362 – 30 September 1440), married firstly, Margaret de Ros, by whom he had six children, and secondly, Joan Ashley, by whom he had another six children.
2. Eleanor Grey, married William Lucy.
3. John Grey (born 1364, date of death unknown)
4. Catherine Grey (born 1366, date of death unknown)
5. Ida Grey (c. 1368 – 1 June 1426), married Sir John Cokayne, by whom she had six children.

== Bibliography ==
- Burke's Peerage and Baronetage. 1939.

Peerage of England
Preceded by Roger Grey	Baron Grey of Ruthin; 1353–1388	Succeeded by Reynold Grey
