= Philip le Despenser, 1st Baron le Despenser =

Philip le Despenser, 1st Baron le Despenser (18 October 1342 in Gedney, Lincolnshire, England – 4 August 1401) was the son and heir of Sir Philip le Despenser of Goxhill, grandson of Sir Philip le Despenser, and great-grandson of Hugh le Despenser, 1st Earl of Winchester. His mother was Joan Cobham, daughter of John Cobham, 2nd Baron Cobham of Kent. He was created Baron le Despenser by writ of summons on 17 December 1387.

He married a woman named Elizabeth. He was summoned to Parliament in 1400, and died on 4 August 1401. Any hereditary title later held to have been created by summons to Parliament would have passed to his son, Philip le Despenser, though none of his descendants were summoned as Barons le Despenser.

Peerage of England
Preceded by New creation	Baron le Despenser; 1387–1401	Succeeded by Philip le Despenser
