= Philip le Despenser, 2nd Baron le Despenser =

Philip le Despenser, 2nd Baron le Despenser (c.1365 in Nettlestead, Suffolk, England – 20 June 1424) was the son and heir of Philip le Despenser, 1st Baron le Despenser. Philip was aged 36 and more at the death of his father Philip le Despenser in 1401, having been knighted in 1385.

He married Elizabeth de Tibetot, co-heiress and daughter of Robert Tiptoft, 3rd Baron Tibetot and his wife Margaret Deincourt. By this marriage he inherited the manors of Nettlestead and Barrow among others.

He was never summoned to Parliament, and died on 20 June 1424 without male heir. Any hereditary right created when his father was summoned passed with his property to his only daughter, Margery le Despenser, wife of John de Ros, 7th Baron de Ros and secondly Roger Wentworth of Nettlestead, Esq. Margery and Roger Wentworth of the later Lords Wentworth and of Jane Seymour, third queen consort of King Henry VIII.

Peerage of England
Preceded by Philip le Despenser	Baron le Despenser; 1401–1424	Succeeded by dormant
