= Nettlestead, Suffolk =

Settlement in England

Coordinates: 52.106373°N 1.0518962°E

Nettlestead
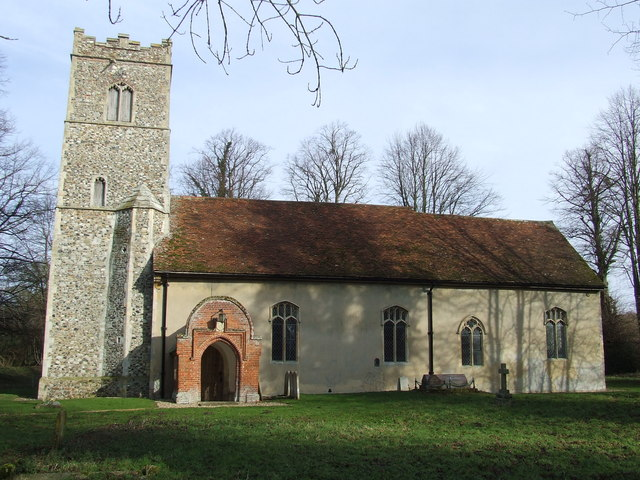
- St Mary, Nettlestead

- Location within Suffolk
- Population: 90; 870 (2011 Census)
- District: Mid Suffolk
- Shire county: Suffolk
- Region: East
- Country: England
- Sovereign state: United Kingdom
- Post town: Ipswich
- Postcode district: IP8
- Dialling code: 01473
- Police: Suffolk
- Fire: Suffolk
- Ambulance: East of England

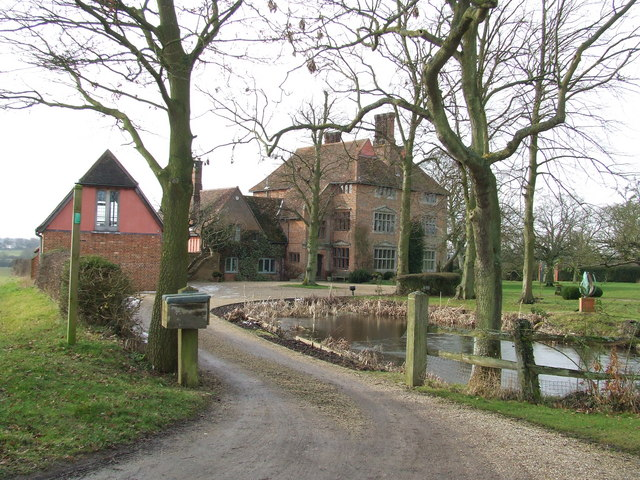
High Hall, Nettlestead

Nettlestead is a dispersed village and civil parish in the Mid Suffolk district of Suffolk in eastern England. The surrounding villages of Nettlestead include Somersham (the closest), Little Blakenham, Baylham, Barking, Willisham and Offton.

== Historicbuildings ==
In Nettlestead there are two manors:

=== Nettlestead Hall, The Chase ===
The original manor was known as Nettlestead Chase. It belonged to the Earls of Richmond. It later passed ownership to Peter II, Count of Savoy, Robert de Tiptoft, Philip le Despenser, 1st Baron le Despenser. The Later Wentworth families held the estate as Baron of Nettlestead. The hall was situated in the village of Nettlestead behind the church of which only the ancient gateway survives bearing the arms of the Wentworth's. From the 13th to the 16th centuries the Nettlestead families were patrons of the house of friars minor at Ipswich.

=== High Hall ===
High Hall dates back to the 16th Century and was built by Huguenots who had fled from France during series of religious persecutions.

Located to the north-west of Ipswich and 11 miles from Stowmarket, in 2005 its population was 90.

== Notable residents ==
- John Bois (1560–1643), scholar, and member of the translating committee for the 1611 King James Version of the Bible.
