= List of knights banneret of England =

Listed here are those dubbed "knight banneret" in England.

Under English custom the rank of knight banneret could only be conferred by the sovereign on the field of battle. There were some technical exceptions to this; when his standard was on the field of battle he could be regarded as physically present though he was not. His proxy could be regarded as a sufficient substitution for his presence.

== Edward III ==
Battle of Crécy

- 26 August 1346, Sir John de Lisle, of Rougemont, Devon – by writ
- 1346 Giles dit Paonet de Roet with one or two esquires; a Guyenne Herald and household knight of Edward III.
- 1348, Sir Henry de Braylesford, of Brailsford, Derbyshire. He was nominated to represent Stafford, serving under William de Clinton, Earl of Huntingdon until he returned home by royal letter of protection because he was invalided out of the King's division. He was exonerated from assessment of his lands in Derby and Stafford on 10 October 1349.

Battle of Nájera

- 1367, Sir John Chandos during the Spanish Campaign led by Edward the Black Prince (eldest son of King Edward III and father to King Richard II). (Note: This was an unusual award because it was given before the battle rather than afterwards, but Chandos had fought in many previous battles with the Black Prince and it was no doubt considered to be overdue (Johnes 1857, p. 307).)

== Edward IV ==
Knights banneret created by King Edward IV on that voyage and late journey [ie after the Battle of Tewkesbury and on the journey to London, where the Bastard of Fauconbridge was beaten off]; whose pennons and standards (in the difference from pennants) were rent by royal command. (Note: Tearing off the points of a pennon turns it into a banner. A pennon, with its two points, was the personal ensign of a knight; the banner was square or oblong and was the collective ensign of a banneret and the knights, men-at-arms and others under his command. Thus a pennon indicated knightly rank, while a banner was the emblem of military authority. (Boutell 1859, pp. 293, 305, illus.))

- 4–21 May 1471, Thomas Grey.
- 4–21 May 1471, Richard Hastings – afterwards Lord Welles.
- 4–21 May 1471, John Courtenay.
- 4–21 May 1471, Nicholas Latymer.
- 5 May 1471, Rauf Hastings – sheriff of Northamptonshire.
- 4–21 May 1471, Roger Touchet.
- 4–21 May 1471, John Stanley.
- 4–21 May 1471, Simon Montford.
- 4–21 May 1471, John Helmingham.
- 4–21 May 1471, William Stanley.
- 4–21 May 1471, Thomas Dering.
- 4–21 May 1471, William Stamford.
- 4–21 May 1471, John Aberdenny.

Knights banneret created in Scotland by Richard, Duke of Gloucester, probably on the conclusion of Treaty of Fotheringhay (11 June 1482) between the Duke of Gloucester, Alexander, Duke of Albany and the Scottish nobles near Edinburgh.

- 24 July 1482, Edward Wydevill (Woodvile).
- 24 July 1482, Walter Herbert.
- 24 July 1482, Herbert Greystoke.
- 24 July 1482, John Elrington.
- 24 July 1482, Henry Percy.
- 24 July 1482, William Gascoigne.
- 24 July 1482, Edmond Hastings.
- 24 July 1482, James Tyrell.
- 24 July 1482, James Danby.
- 24 July 1482, Hugh Hastings.
- 24 July 1482, Raug Assheton.
- 24 July 1482, William Redman.
- 24 July 1482, Richard Radcliffe.
- 24 July 1482, Thomas Mauleverer.
- 24 July 1482, Bryan Stapleton.
- 24 July 1482, John Savage.
- 24 July 1482, William Evers.
- 24 July 1482, Piers Middleton.
- 24 July 1482, Christopher Warde.
- 24 July 1482, Stephen Hamerton.
- 24 July 1482, Thomas Tempest.
- 24 July 1482, John Everingham.
- 24 July 1482, Robert Harrington.
- 24 July 1482, Thomas Broughton.
- 24 July 1482, John Aske.
- 24 July 1482, Thomas Grey, de Werke.
- 24 July 1482, Rauf Woderington.
- 24 July 1482, Roger Thorneton.
- 24 July 1482, Thomas Molyneux.
- 24 July 1482, Alexander Houghton.
- 24 July 1482, Piers Legh.
- 24 July 1482, Edward Stanley.
- 24 July 1482, John Grey, de Wilton.
- 24 July 1482, Richard Hodleston.

Knights banneret created by Richard, Duke of Gloucester, in Scotland at Hutton Field beside Berwick, probably at the surrendering of Berwick to the English, which took place on 24 August 1482. (Note: Shaw and Metcalfe also list more knights and bannerets made by Richard, Duke of Gloucester on 11 August, but fails to distinguish them from each other: 22 August 1482, William Darcy; 22 August 1482, John Melton.; 22 August 1482, John Savill.; 22 August 1482, Rauf Bulmer.; 22 August 1482, Rauf Bigod.; 22 August 1482, Raug Bowes (or Bowyer).; 22 August 1482, John Constable, of Holderness.; 22 August 1482, James Strangeways.; 22 August 1482, Robert Middelton.; 22 August 1482, William FitzWilliam.; 22 August 1482, Thomas FitzWilliam.; 22 August 1482, Thomas Worsley.; 22 August 1482, James Danby.; 22 August 1482, Thomas Malyverer.; 22 August 1482, Rauf FitzRandall.; 22 August 1482, Charles Pilkington.; 22 August 1482, Robert Waterton.; 22 August 1482, John Nevil, of Liversedge.; 22 August 1482, Richard Conyers, of Cowton.; 22 August 1482, William Beckwithe.)

- 22 August 1482, Thomas Pilkington.
- 22 August 1482, Robert Ryder.

== Henry VII ==
Knights banneret created by King Henry VII at the battle of Stoke Field the first three were appointed before the battle and the other eleven after:

- 16 June 1487, Gilbert Talbot – before the battle of Stoke Field.
- 16 June 1487, John Cheyney – before the battle of Stoke Field.
- 16 June 1487, William Stonor – before the battle of Stoke Field.
- 16 June 1487, John Arundell.
- 16 June 1487, Thomas Cokesey (alias Grevill).
- 16 June 1487, Edmonde Bedingfeld.
- 16 June 1487, John Fortescue.
- 16 June 1487, Humfrey Stanley.
- 16 June 1487, James Blount.
- 16 June 1487, Richard de la Bere.
- 16 June 1487, John Mortimer.
- 16 June 1487, William Troutbecke.
- 16 June 1487, Richard Crofts.
- 16 June 1487, James Baskerville.

Knights banneret created by King Henry VII after the battle of Deptford Bridge (also called the battle of Blackheath) which took place during the Cornish Rebellion of 1497.

- 17 June 1497, Thomas Lovell.
- 17 June 1497, Charles Somerset.
- 17 June 1497, Reginald Bray.
- 17 June 1497, Richard Guylforde.
- 17 June 1497, Robert Harecourt.
- 17 June 1497, Rees ap Thomas.
- 17 June 1497, Henry Willoughby.
- 17 June 1497, Richard FitzLewis.
- 17 June 1497, John St John.
- 17 June 1497, Tomast Greene.
- 17 June 1497, Robert Broughton.
- 17 June 1497, Nicholas Vaux.
- 17 June 1497, William Tyrwhitte.
- 17 June 1497, Thomas Tyrell.

Recorded in the same manuscript were two more men who were dubbed knight banneret by King Henry VII at the foot of London Bridge as he entered The City after the battle:

- 17 June 1497, John Hanmer.
- 17 June 1497, Morgan Young.

Knights banneret created in Scotland by Thomas, Earl of Surrey, King Henry VII's lieutenant in the north, on or before 30 September 1497:

- 30 September 1497, William Gascoigne.
- 30 September 1497, John Nevill.
- 30 September 1497, John Hastings.
- 30 September 1497, Thomas Darcy.
- 30 September 1497, Walter Griffith.
- 30 September 1497, Rauf Ryder.
- 30 September 1497, Thomas Worsley.
- 30 September 1497, Roger Bellingham.
- 30 September 1497, William Tyler.
- 30 September 1497, Edward Pykeringe.

== Henry VIII ==
Knights banneret created by King Henry VIII possibly at the battle of the Spurs in France (16 August 1513) but they may have been appointed the following year. (Note: Shaw 1906, p. 26 notes Harl MS. 5177 says anno 5, 6 (Henry VIII 5th year started on 22 April 1513 and ended on 21 April 1514, so the date of 16 August was either 1513 or 1514 (See Regnal years of English monarchs)))

- 16 August 1513, John Peche.
- 16 August 1513, Egburt Brandon.
- 16 August 1513, Henry Guildford.
- 16 August 1513, Edward Poynings.
- 16 August 1513, Andrew Wyndsore – treasurer of the King's Middleward of battle.
- 16 August 1513, John Raynsford.
- 16 August 1513, Henry Wyatt.
- 16 August 1513, John Seymour.
- 16 August 1513, John Audeley.
- 16 August 1513, Richard Carew.
- 16 August 1513, Anthony Ughtred.(Shaw 1906, p. 231)
- 16 August 1513, Thomas West.
- 16 August 1513, Robert Dymoke – treasurer of the King's Rearward.
- 16 August 1513, John Hussey.
- 16 August 1513, John Arundell.
- 16 August 1513, Richard Wentworth.
- 16 August 1513, Randolf Brereton – marshal of the Rearward.
- 16 August 1513, Piers Edgecombe
- 16 August 1513, Henry Clyfforde.
- 16 August 1513, Thomas Cornewall.
- 16 August 1513, Thomas Leighton.
- 16 August 1513, Thomas Blount.
- 16 August 1513, John Aston.
- 16 August 1513, William Pierpont.
- 16 August 1513, Henry Sacheverele.
- 16 August 1513, George Holforde.
- 16 August 1513, Henry Halsall.
- 16 August 1513, John Warburton.
- 18 August 1513, Thomas Barnardiston. (Note: Metcalfe describes Sir Thomas's coat of arms thus: Gules, a fess dancettée Ermine between three cross-crosslets fitchée Argent a bendlet sinister Or. Crest—A talbot's head Gules earned Argent gorged with a fess dancettée Ermine.)

Knight banneret created at Leith in Scotland on Sunday 11 May 1544, by Edward, Earl of Hertford, the King's lieutenant, at the burning of Edinburgh, Leith and elsewhere.

- 11 May 1544, Edward, Lord Clinton (later Earl of Lincoln). (Note: Shaw 1906, p. 54 notes that Lord Clinton, is referred to as "chevalier" in April, 1536, when he was summoned to Parliament.)

Knight banneret created by the Earl of Hertford, the King's lieutenant, being then encamped at our Lady Church by Norham Castle on his coming home after he had been in Scotland 15 days.

- 23 September 1545, John Nevill, 4th Lord Latimer. (Note: Shaw 1906, p. 57 notes John, Lord Latimer is styled "chevalier" from at least 14 June 1543, in the writs summoning him to Parliament; possibly he was created a knight banneret in 1545.)

== Edward VI ==
Knights banneret were created at the camp beside Roxburgh (18–25 September 1547), in Scotland, during the first year of the reign of King Edward VI. by the "hands of the high and mighty Prince Edward, Duke of Somerset, Lieutenant-General of all the King's armies by land and sea, and Governor of his Royal person and Protector of all his realms, dominions and subjects".

- 18–25 September 1547, Francys Bryan.
- 18–25 September 1547, Ralph Sadler.
- 18–25 September 1547, Raufe Vane.
- 18–25 September 1547, William, 13th Lord Grey de Wilton. (Note: Shaw 1906, p. 57 notes William, Lord Grey of Wilton, is described as chivaler in the writs summoning him to Parliament from November 1529 onwards. Possibly he was made a knight banneret in 1547.)

== Charles I ==
King Charles I created several knights banneret after the battle of Edgehill (1642) including:

- Thomas Strickland, of Sizergh for gallantry.
- John Smith for rescuing the Royal Standard under enemy fire.

== Great Britain and the United Kingdom ==
Whether any appointments as knight banneret were formally made after the Act of Union 1707 is debated by historians and there is no general agreement.

=== George II ===
George Cokayne notes in The Complete Peerage (1913) that King George II revived the honour when he created sixteen knights banneret on the field of the battle of Dettingen on 27 June 1743: (Note: 27 June 1743 was the date as it was recorded on the Continent using the Gregorian calendar, In Britain where the Julian calendar was in use the date was 16 June 1743 (see Old Style and New Style dates).)

- William, Duke of Cumberland
- Charles, 3rd Duke of Marlborough
- John, 2nd Earl of Stair
- John, 2nd Earl of Dunmore
- John, 20th Earl of Crawford
- John, 19th Earl of Rothes
- William, 2nd Earl of Albemarle
- John, 1st Earl Ligonier
- General Philip Honywood
- General Henry Hawley
- General John Cope
- General James Campbell
- General Humphrey Bland
- General Richard Onslow
- General Harry Pulteney
- General John Huske
- Thomas Brown

Although Cokayne's source for this, a diary entry by Miss Gertrude Savile, states "This honour had been laid aside since James I, when Baronets were instituted", which contradicts other sources, a news magazine published in the same year as the battle recorded the honours.

=== George III ===
Several sources, including Edward Brenton (1828) and William James (1827), record that Captains Trollope and Fairfax were honoured as bannerets by King George III for their actions during the battle of Camperdown (1797). However, these awards were never recorded in The London Gazette. It is much more likely that these knighthoods, which first appear in formal records in December 1797 without their nature being specified, were as knights bachelor. (Note: "When the fleet returned to the Nore [George III] signified his intention of visiting it there, and Trollope, as the senior captain, was appointed to the Royal Charlotte yacht to bring him from Greenwich. The king accordingly embarked on 30 Oct.; but the wind came dead foul, and after two days the yacht had got no further than Gravesend. He therefore gave up the idea and returned to Greenwich, knighting Trollope on the quarterdeck of the Royal Charlotte before he landed. The accolade conferred ‘under the Royal Standard’ was spoken of as making Trollope a knight banneret, and was apparently so intended by the king; but it is said to have been afterwards decided [by the Privy Council], as a question of precedence, that a knight banneret could only be made on the field where a battle had actually been fought; or presumably, in the case of a naval officer, on the quarterdeck of one of the ships actually engaged".)

=== Victoria ===
On 19 August 1843 James Bombrain, Inspector-General of Coast Guard in Ireland (knighted by the Lord-Lieutenant of Ireland, on board a cruiser in Kingstown Harbour, after an inspection of the Irish squadron of revenue cruisers at Kingstown, Dublin, is erroneously supposed to have been a knight banneret in consequence of having been knighted under the Royal Standard).
