= William Villiers, 2nd Viscount Grandison =

English army officer (1614–1643)

The Right Honourable The Viscount Grandison
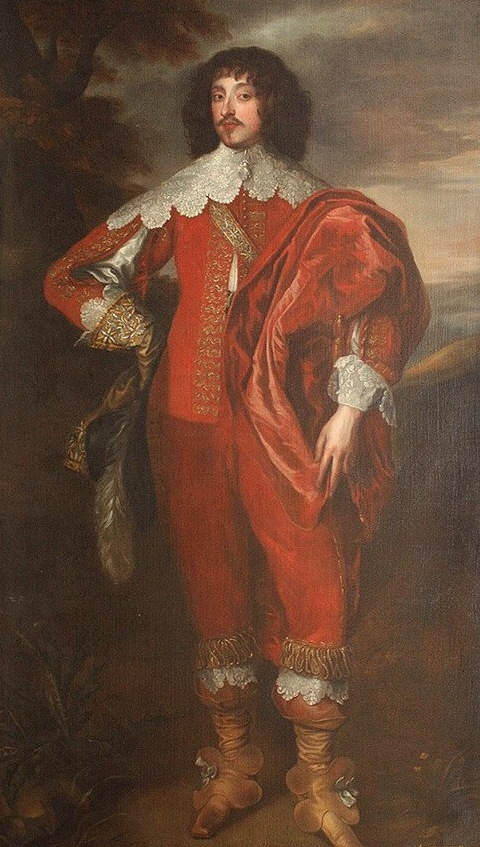

Personal details
- Born: 1614 London, England
- Died: 23 September 1643 (aged 29) Oxford, England
- Resting place: Christ Church Cathedral, Oxford
- Spouse: Mary Bayning (1639–his death)
- Children: Barbara Palmer, 1st Duchess of Cleveland
- Parents: Edward Villiers (father); Barbara St John (mother)
- Occupation: Courtier and soldier

Military service
- Rank: Colonel
- Battles/wars: Bishops' Wars; First English Civil War; Battle of Edgehill; Storming of Bristol †

Colonel William Villiers, 2nd Viscount Grandison (1614 – 23 September 1643) was an English army officer who was killed in action during the First English Civil War in 1643.

== Early life ==
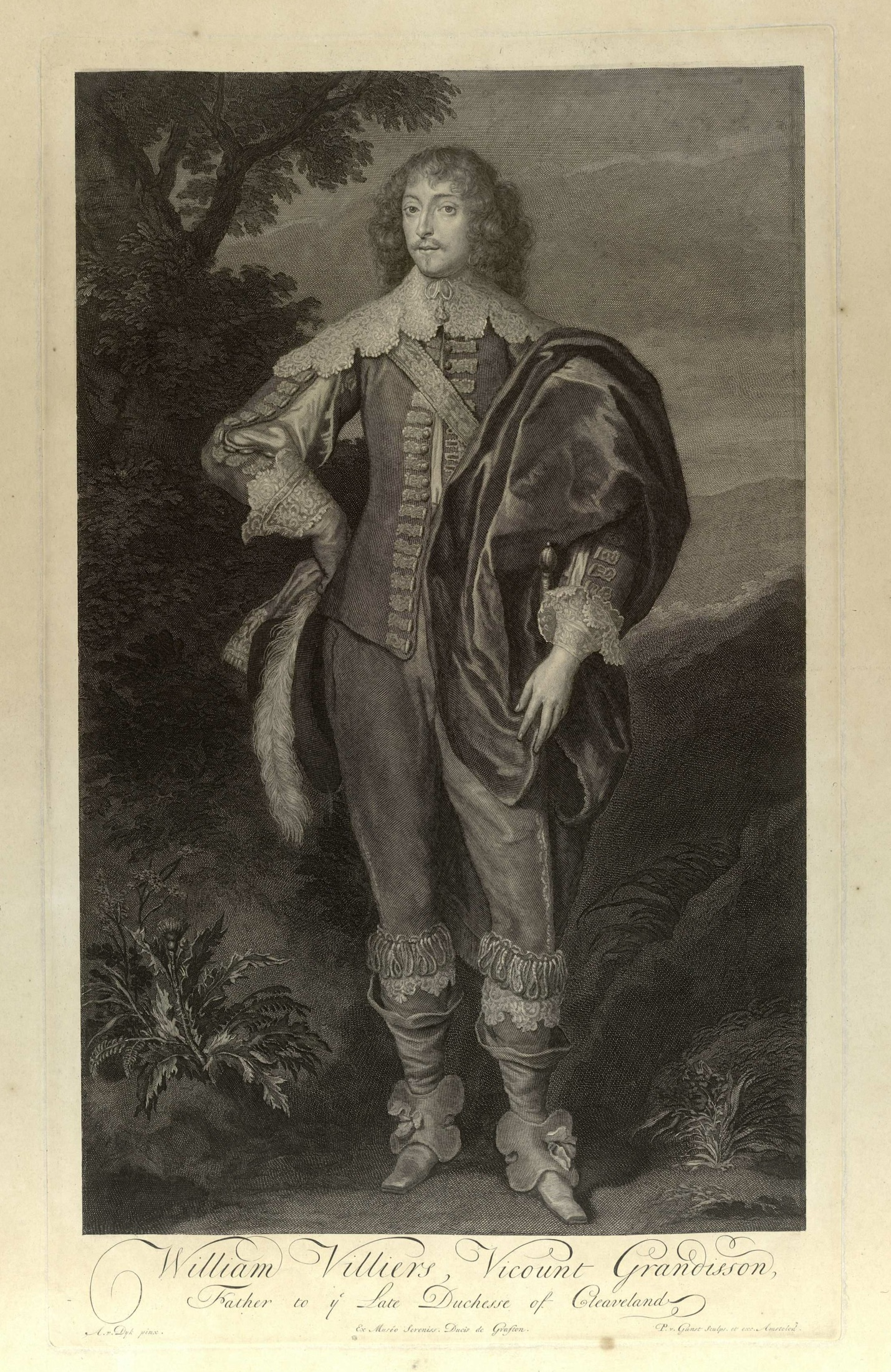
Grandison by Pieter van Gunst, c. 1714

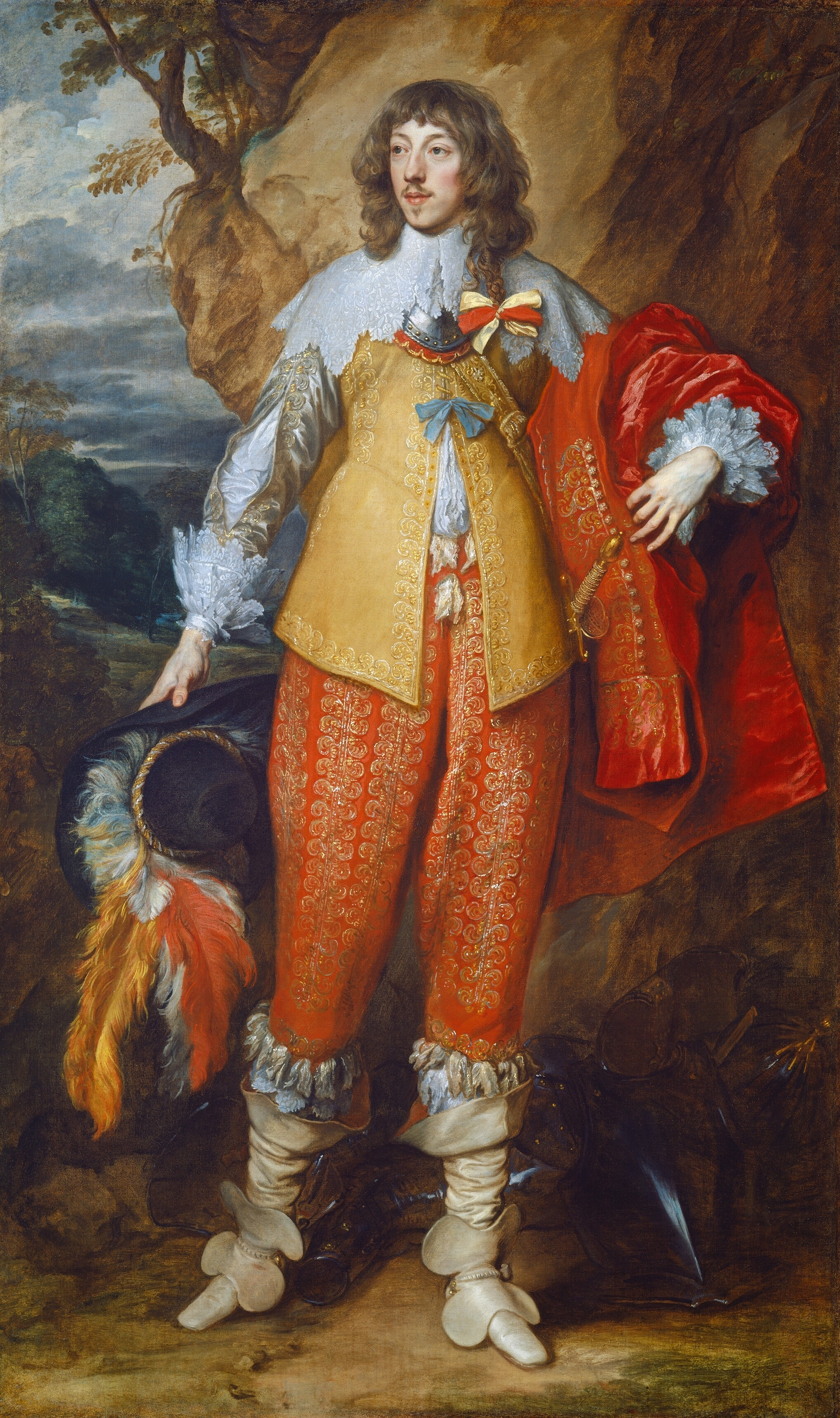
The Whitney Van Dyck

William Villiers was born in 1614, eldest son of Sir Edward Villiers (1585–1626) and Barbara St. John (ca 1592–1672). His father was the older half-brother of George Villiers, 1st Duke of Buckingham, favourite of both James VI and I and Charles I, a relationship from which he greatly benefitted. Appointed Lord President of Munster, he died in Cork in 1626, leaving enormous debts; his wife was still repaying them in the 1660s.

Villiers was one of ten children; his siblings included Anne (1610–1654), John (1616–1659), George (1618–1699), Barbara (1618–1681) and Edward (1620–1689). The Villiers were a powerful and well connected family; William's relatives included John Villiers, 1st Viscount Purbeck, Christopher Villiers, 1st Earl of Anglesey, and Susan Feilding, who was Lady of the Bedchamber to Queen Henrietta Maria.

In 1639, Grandison married Mary Bayning (1623–1672), heiress to a fortune of £180,000; they had one daughter, Barbara Villiers (1640–1709), who was later mistress to Charles II. After his death, Mary married his cousin Christopher Villiers, Second Earl of Anglesey (1625–1661).

== Political and military career ==
Villiers grew up mostly in London, where his father was Master of the Mint, a post which gave him rooms at the Tower of London. On 23 June 1623, when his childless great-uncle Oliver St John (1559–1630) was created Viscount Grandison in the peerage of Ireland, the honour was made subject to a special remainder that it would be inherited by the heirs male of St John's niece Barbara Villiers. This meant when St John died in December 1630, Villiers inherited his title.

In 1638 Charles I knighted Grandison at Windsor, together with the Prince of Wales and Thomas Bruce, 1st Earl of Elgin. During the 1639 and 1640 Bishops' Wars, he was commissioned as colonel but does not appear to have seen action. When the First English Civil War began in August 1642, Grandison raised a regiment of cavalry, which formed part of the Royalist left wing at Edgehill on 23 October. During the fighting, Sir Edmund Verney was killed and the Royal Standard captured but then recovered by three men led by John Smith, an officer in Grandison's regiment. Smith was knighted on the field, becoming the last knight banneret created in England, and promoted to major by Grandison; he was later killed at Cheriton in 1644.

At the Storming of Bristol on 26 July 1643, Grandison led one of three brigades or "tertia" commanded by Prince Rupert of the Rhine. His unit made a series of attacks on Prior's Hill Fort and a redoubt at Stokes Croft, in the third of which he was wounded in the right leg. together with his cousin Edward St John, a son of his uncle Sir John St John. Grandison was taken to Oxford where he died on 29 September, presumably of a fever related to the injury, since Hyde explicitly states the wound caused his death. (Note: "Lord Grandison, whose loss can never be enough lamented. He was a young Man of so virtuous a habit of mind that no temptation or provocation could corrupt him; so great a Lover of Justice and integrity, that no example, necessity, or even the barbarity of this War, could make him swerve from the most precise Rules of it; and of that rare Piety and Devotion, that the Court, or Camp, could not shew a more faultless Person, or to whose example young Men might more reasonably conform themselves".)

As Grandison had no son, he was succeeded by a younger brother, John Villiers. After the Restoration, Grandison's only child, Barbara Villiers, became a royal mistress of King Charles II, in 1670 was created Duchess of Cleveland, and became the ancestor of several noble families, including the Dukes of Grafton. Grandison's mother, Barbara Lady Villiers, born about 1592, lived into her eighties and saw the Restoration and the early years of her great-grandchildren.

Lord Grandison's youngest brother, Edward, was the father of Edward Villiers, 1st Earl of Jersey, and the present-day Viscount Grandison is his descendant, William Villiers (born 1976), a film executive.

== Lydiard portrait ==
A portrait of Grandison survived at Lydiard House, his mother's family home in Wiltshire, as of 2006. It is catalogued as by the school of Anthony van Dyck. At the bottom right of the canvas is the name "LD. GRANDISSON". This painting was engraved about 1714 by Pieter van Gunst, who identified it as "William Villiers, Vicount Grandisson, Father to ye Late Duchesse of Cleaveland", with the attribution "A v. Dyk pinx". Theresa Lewis, in her Lives of the Friends and Contemporaries of Lord Chancellor Clarendon (1852), gives an unmistakable description of this portrait and reports that two copies of it then existed, one owned by the Duke of Grafton, a direct descendant of Grandison's, and the other by Earl Fitzwilliam.

== Another portrait ==
A similar but more sumptuous portrait of a young man, also known as Viscount Grandison, said to have belonged to George Villiers, 2nd Duke of Buckingham, was at Stocks Park, Hertfordshire, before being exhibited at the Royal Academy in 1893 as the property of Arthur Kay, Esq. After that it was sold to Hugo Othmar Miethke, who quickly sold it to Jacob Herzog of Vienna. Exhibited as "William Villiers, Viscount Grandison", this had a great impact at a Van Dyck Tercentenary Exhibition at Antwerp in 1899, and in 1901 the portrait was bought by William Collins Whitney, who paid $125,000 for it. This was the second-highest price ever attached to a painting at the time, defeated only by Millet's Angelus. Still named as a portrait of Grandison, it went on to create a sensation at the Van Dyck Loan Exhibition at Detroit in 1929, and in 1932, on the death of H. P. Whitney, was inherited by his widow Gertrude Vanderbilt Whitney. In 1948 Cornelius Vanderbilt Whitney gave it to the National Gallery of Art in Washington, D.C.

The art historian Lionel Cust, Director of the National Portrait Gallery, suggested in 1905 that the Whitney portrait was of another man, and might be a likeness of the younger brother of Grandison, John Villiers, who became the third Viscount in 1643. A more powerful identification was made in the 1940s, when an early 18th century drawing of the painting by Louis Boudan was found, marked as Henry de Lorraine, duc de Guise. The National Gallery of Art now attaches that name to it.

== Sources ==
- Andrews, Allen (1971). The Royal Whore: Barbara Villiers, Countess of Castlemaine. Hutchinson. ISBN 978-0091070403.
- BCW (6 May 2021). "Lord Grandison's Regiment of Horse".
- Carlton, Charles (1992). Going to the Wars; The experience of the British Civil Wars, 1638-1651. Routledge. ISBN 0-415-03282-2.
- Clarendon, Earl of (1717). The History of the Rebellion and Civil Wars in England, Book VII. Oxford University.
- Cokayne, George Edward (1912). The Complete Peerage of England, Scotland, Ireland, Great Britain and the United Kingdom. Vicary Gibbs.
- Debrett, John (1837). Debrett's Peerage of England, Scotland, and Ireland.
- Firth, Charles Harding; Leslie, JH (1925). "The Siege and capture of Bristol by Royalist forces in 1643". Journal of the Society for Army Historical Research. 4 (18): 180–203. JSTOR 44227516.
- Pollard, AP (2004). "Villiers, Christopher, first earl of Anglesey(d. 1630)". Oxford Dictionary of National Biography (online ed.). Oxford University Press. doi:10.1093/ref:odnb/28287. (Subscription, Wikipedia Library access or UK public library membership required.)
- Thrush, Andrew (2004). "Villiers, Sir Edward(c. 1585–1626)". Oxford Dictionary of National Biography (online ed.). Oxford University Press. doi:10.1093/ref:odnb/28288. (Subscription, Wikipedia Library access or UK public library membership required.)

Peerage of Ireland
Preceded by Oliver St John	Viscount Grandison; 1630–1643	Succeeded by John Villiers
