= Gilliam van der Gouwen =

Flemish engraver

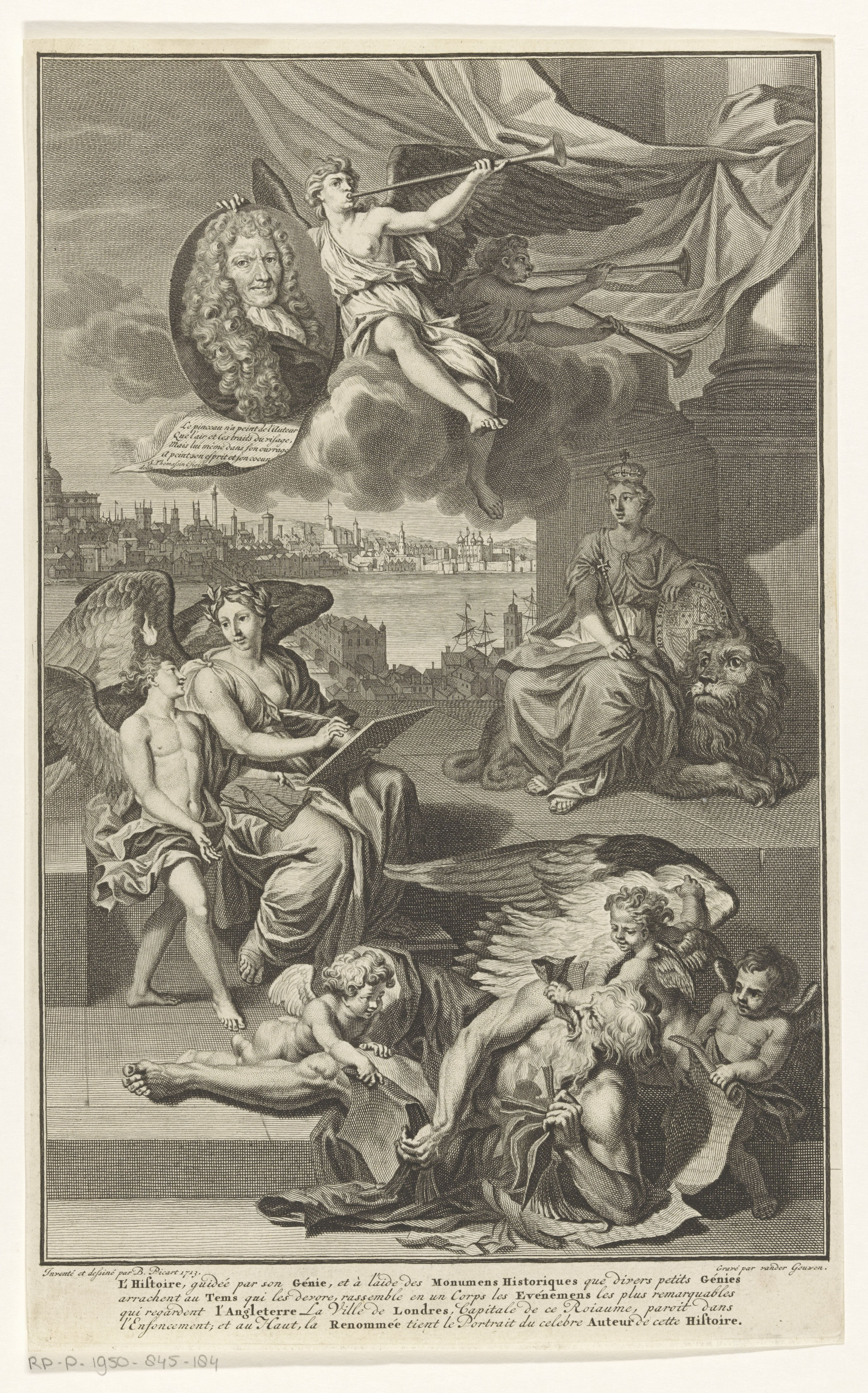
Allegory of the History of Britain with the Portrait of Isaac de Larrey

Gilliam van der Gouwen, first name also transcribed as Guilliam and Willem (ca. 1657, Antwerp — buried on 15 March 1716, Amsterdam) was a Flemish engraver who spent most of his active career in the Dutch Republic. He is known for his reproductive engravings and various title pages, maps and book illustrations for the Amsterdam publishers.

== Life ==
He was born in Antwerp around 1657. In the guild year 1669–1670, he was registered at the Antwerp Guild of Saint Luke studying engraving as a pupil of Pieter van Lisebetten. There is no record of van der Gouwen registering as a master in the Antwerp Guild. He left Antwerp and is recorded in Amsterdam where in June 1680 he started taking drawing classes with the German painter Pieter Rodingh. During the period of 14 months that the took the classes, Rodingh also helped him out with two of his engravings. Later a dispute arose between van der Gouwen and Rodingh over payment for the classes as well as for a portrait of van der Gouwen and his wife painted by Rodingh. The matter was settled amicably.

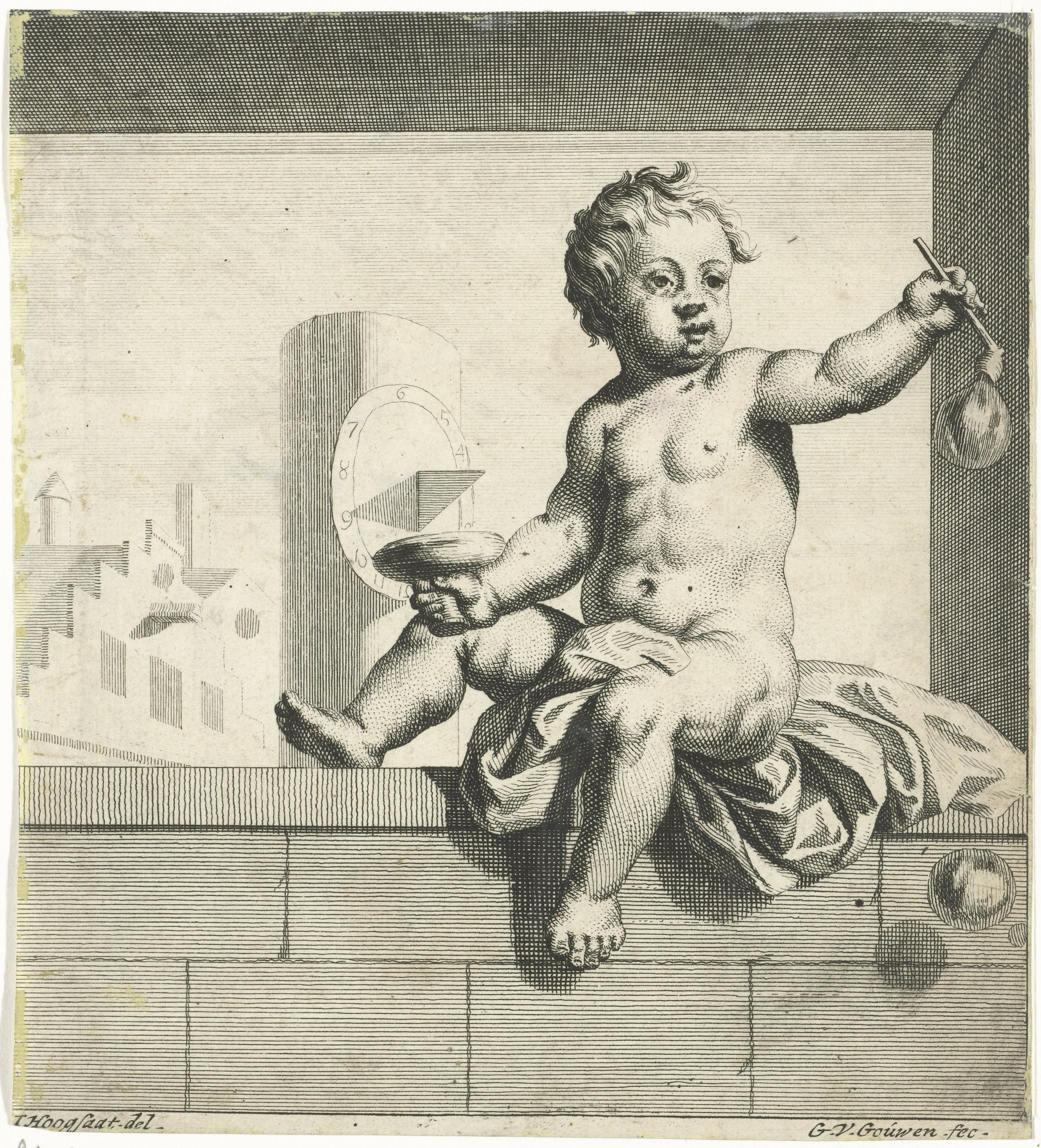
Putto blowing bubbles, allegory of Vanitas

He is also said to have studied with Gerard de Lairesse. He collaborated with de Lairesse on publications such as de Lairesse's Het groot schilderboeck ("Great Book of Painting"), published in 1710 for which he made the title page and various illustrations. He worked as an assistant in the workshop of the engraver and publisher Pieter van Gunst. He made for the sheet music publisher Estienne Roger various title pages for musical publications. An example is the title page of Arcangelo Corelli's Concerti Grossi published by Roger in Amsterdam in 1714. The print represents St. Cecilia Playing a Lute and was made after a design by the Italian painter Francesco Trevisani.

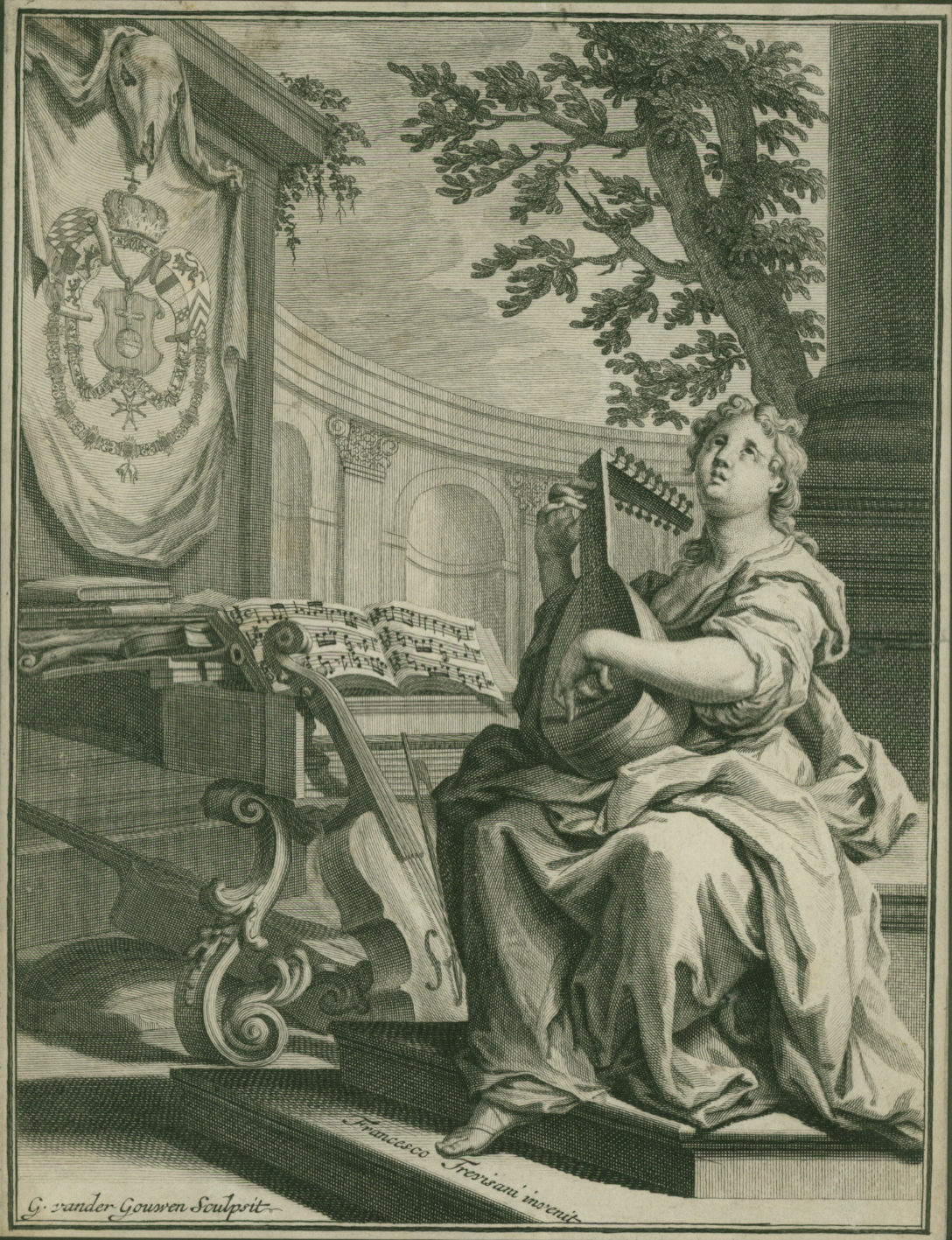
Title page of Corelli's Concerti Grossi

He further engraved many of Philip Tideman's designs for title pages and book illustrations. He was the teacher of Jan Wandelaar. He worked on a series of biblical prints after designs of Gerard Hoet, Arnold Houbraken and Bernard Picart. These were used in various publications including the Figures de la Bible published in 1720 and the Taferelen der voornaamste geschiedenissen van het Oude en Nieuwe Testament published in the Hague by Pieter de Hondt. The latter publication was a picture bible comprising 214 large engravings of which van der Gouwen had engraved 41.

He married twice. He married Maria Willems in Amsterdam on 8 September 1679. Their daughter Lysbet was born in 1688. His first wife died and was buried in Amsterdam on 29 July 1700. He married Anna Gerrits in Amsterdam on 19 October 1703.

He was buried in Amsterdam on 15 March 1716.

== Work ==
He is known for portraits, allegorical scenes and biblical illustrations.

He contributed many illustrations to Hugo de Groot's Nederlandtsche jaerboeken en historien, published in Amsterdam in 1681. An example is the Beached whale near Berckhey. The print was made after an engraving made by Jacob Matham after a design by Hendrick Goltzius.
