= Estienne Roger =

French Huguenot printer, bookseller and publisher

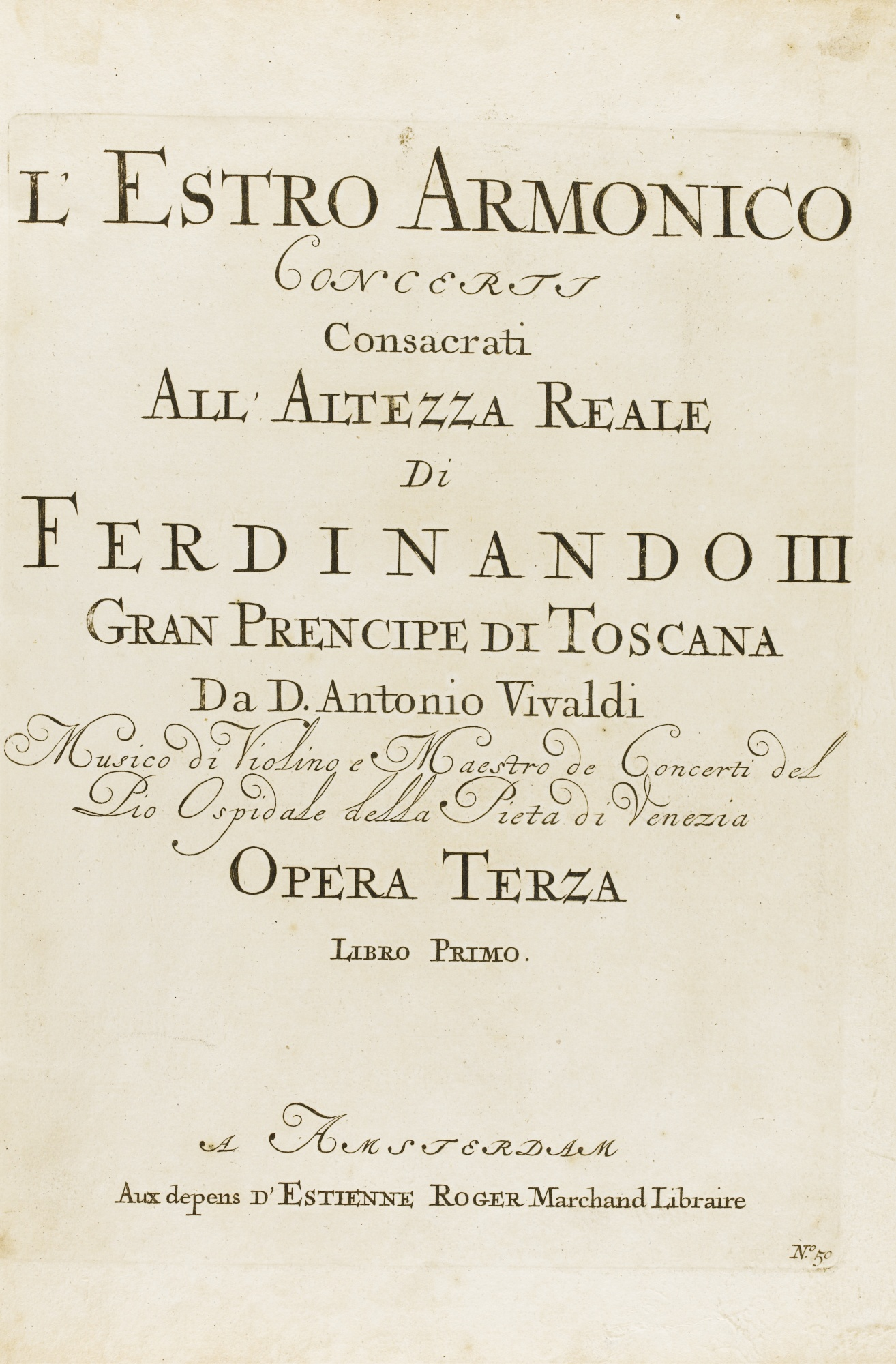
Title page of the L'estro armonico of Vivaldi, 1st edition

Estienne Roger (1664 or 1665 in Caen, France – 7 July 1722 in Amsterdam) was a francophone printer, bookseller and publisher of sheet music working in the Netherlands.

== Life ==
Roger was born a French Huguenot. The revocation of Edict of Nantes in 1685 made him flee with his family to the Netherlands where he settled in Amsterdam. In 1691 he married Marie-Suzanne de Magneville (c. 1671–1712); by that time his father had settled in England. He learned the trade of printing from Antoine Pointel and Jean-Louis de Lorme. In 1696 he opened his own shop in the Kalverstraat.

Roger concentrated on histories, grammars, dictionaries, and eventually became a renowned publisher of musical scores. Between 1696 and 1722 he published over 500 editions of music written by a wide range of composers. In some cases, Roger offered mere reprints aiming at the European market he successfully reached (works that had been published by Giuseppe Sala in Venice or Ballard in Paris). His own publications were reprinted especially by Pierre Mortier in Amsterdam and John Walsh in London. Apart from "serious" music, or "classical" as it would be termed today, he also published popular music, such as his volumes of Oude en Nieuwe Hollantse Boerenlietjes en Contradansen, published 1700–1716.

In 1711 he published Vivaldi's Opus 3 L'estro armonico, a collection of 12 concerti for one, two, and four violins with strings. In 1714 he posthumously published Arcangelo Corelli's Concerti Grossi with a secondary title page engraved by Gilliam van der Gouwen after a design by the Italian painter Francesco Trevisani.

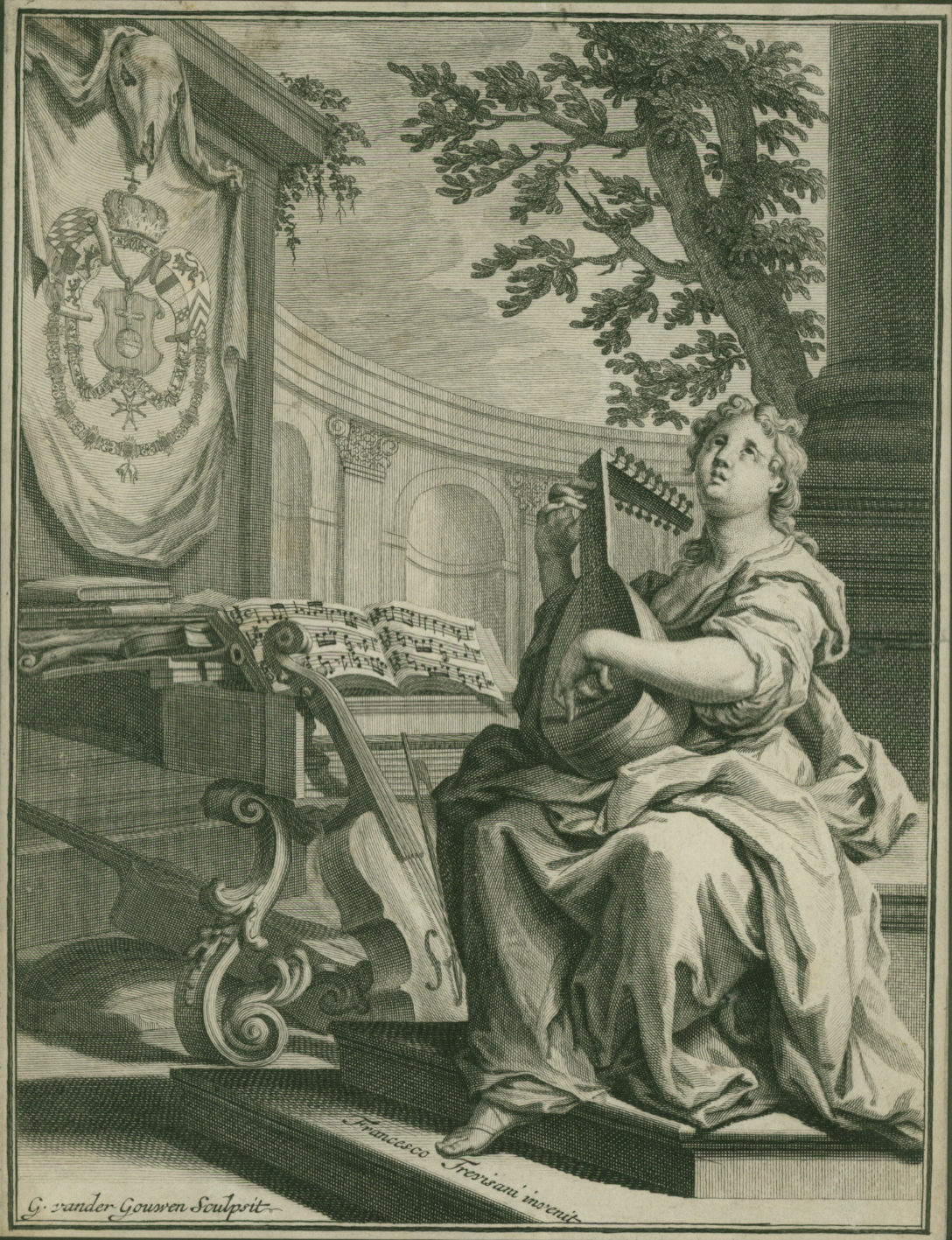
Title page of Arcangelo Corelli's Concerti Grossi, 1714

Roger was famous for the taste and the diligence of his work and for his ability to sell large editions he would advertise in Western Europe. Trade connections to Rotterdam, Brussels, Liege, Paris, Cologne, Leipzig, Halle (Saale), Berlin, Hamburg and London ensured international outreach. His command of the European market was striking, with publication histories such as the one he could grant Constantin de Renneville's French Inquisition. The edition he sold in 1715 was reprinted in London and Nuremberg that very year, proof that his copies had reached readers in both cities within weeks.

== After his death ==
In 1716 Roger's daughter Françoise (1694–1723) had married the printer Michel-Charles Le Cène, his father Charles Le Cène was a renowned Huguenot minister, who worked in the shop until 1720, the date he opened his own business. Roger's second daughter Jeanne (1701–1722) was his official heiress when Roger died on 7 July 1722. She had acted as publisher a few times before 1722. She died only five months after her father.

Instead of passing the shop into the hands of her sister Françoise and her husband Le Cène, Jeanne had left it to Gerrit Drinkman, a company employee who in turn died only a few months later. Le Cène finally acquired the shop and continued its main business of music publishing until his death in 1743 with more than 100 new publications. The inventory was then purchased by the bookseller Emanuel-Jean de la Coste (fl. 1743–1746), who soon thereafter published a full catalog entitled "the books of music, printed at Amsterdam, by Estienne Roger and Michel-Charles Le Cène,". De la Coste did not continue the printing business. In 1746 he sold the business to Antoine Chareau, who had previously worked for Le Cène. The shop ultimately ceased operation in 1748.
