= John Smith (banneret) =

Englishman who supported the Royalist cause in the English Civil War

Sir John Smith of Skilts (1616–1644) was an Englishman who supported the Royalist cause in the English Civil War. He is best known for recapturing the Royal Standard at the Battle of Edgehill, a deed for which he was made a knight banneret by King Charles I on the field of battle.

== Biography ==
John Smith, born in 1616 at Skilts in the parish of Studley, Warwickshire, was fourth son of Sir Francis Smith of Queniborough, Leicestershire, by his wife Anne, daughter of Thomas Markham of Kirkby Beler and of Allerton, Nottinghamshire. His eldest brother, Sir Charles Smith, was elevated to the peerage in 1643 as Baron Carrington of Wootton Wawen in Warwickshire and Viscount Carrington of Barreford in Connaught.

He was brought up a Roman Catholic, his earlier education being entrusted to a kinsman. At a later date he was sent abroad to Germany to complete his studies. He always had a strong disposition for a military life, and ventured to return home without leave, to urge his relatives to permit him to follow his bent. His projects, however, were received with no favour, and he was sent to resume his studies in the Spanish Netherlands. He soon joined the Spanish army which was defending Flanders against the French and Dutch. He distinguished himself by several deeds of daring; but hearing of the Scottish disturbances, he resolved to return to England and offer his services to Charles I. He received a lieutenant's commission, and was victorious in a skirmish with the Scots at Stapleford in the neighbourhood of the Tees. After the conclusion of the Treaty of Ripon, on 28 October 1640, he retired to his mother's house at Ashby Folville in Leicestershire.

When the English Civil War broke out he joined the Royalists and was made a captain-lieutenant under Lord John Stewart (d. 1644) On 9 August 1642 he disarmed the people of Kilsby in Northamptonshire, who had declared for Parliament, and on 23 September he took part in the fight at Powick Bridge (23 September 1642).

At the Battle of Edgehill (23 October 1642) his troop was in Lord Grandison's regiment, on the left wing. In the battle the Royal standard-bearer, Sir Edmund Verney, was killed and the standard taken. Smith, with two others, recovered it. For this service he was knighted on the field, being, it is said, the last knight banneret created in England. He also received a troop of his own, and was appointed by Lord Grandison major of his regiment.

After Edgehill he was sent into the south. He was taken prisoner on 13 December by William Waller in Winchester Castle, and did not obtain his liberty till the September following. On his release he proceeded to Oxford, and was made lieutenant-colonel of Lord Herbert of Raglan's regiment of horse. In 1644 he was despatched to the western army, as major-general of the horse under Lord John Stewart. On 29 March the royalists under Patrick Ruthven, 1st Earl of Forth, engaged the parliamentarians under Waller at Cheriton in Hampshire. The rashness of Henry Bard (afterwards Viscount Bellamont) involved the royalist cavalry in a premature engagement. Smith was mortally wounded, and the dismay occasioned by his fall is said to have hastened his companions' retreat. He died the next day, and was buried on the south side of the choir in Christ Church, Oxford. (Note: An elegy on him appears in Sir Francis Wortley's Characters and Elegies, London, 1646, 4to (Carlyle 1898, p. 74).) (Note: Edward Carlyle, the author of the DNB biography article notes that: the fullest biography is in Edward Walsingham's Britannicæ Virtutis Imago, 1644, Oxford; but it is too eulogistic to be altogether trustworthy, and it differs in many instances from other contemporary accounts. Other authorities are Ludlow's Memoirs, ed. 1751, Edinburgh, i. 42, 95; Lloyd's Memoires, ed. 1668, p. 658; Clarendon's History of the Rebellion, vi. 85, viii. 15, 16; Nugent's Memoirs of Hampden, ii. 298–300; Gardiner's Great Civil War, i. 49–50, 326; Colvile's Worthies of Warwickshire, p. 699; and Le Neve's Monumenta Anglicana, i. 213.)
