= René Auguste Constantin de Renneville =

French writer

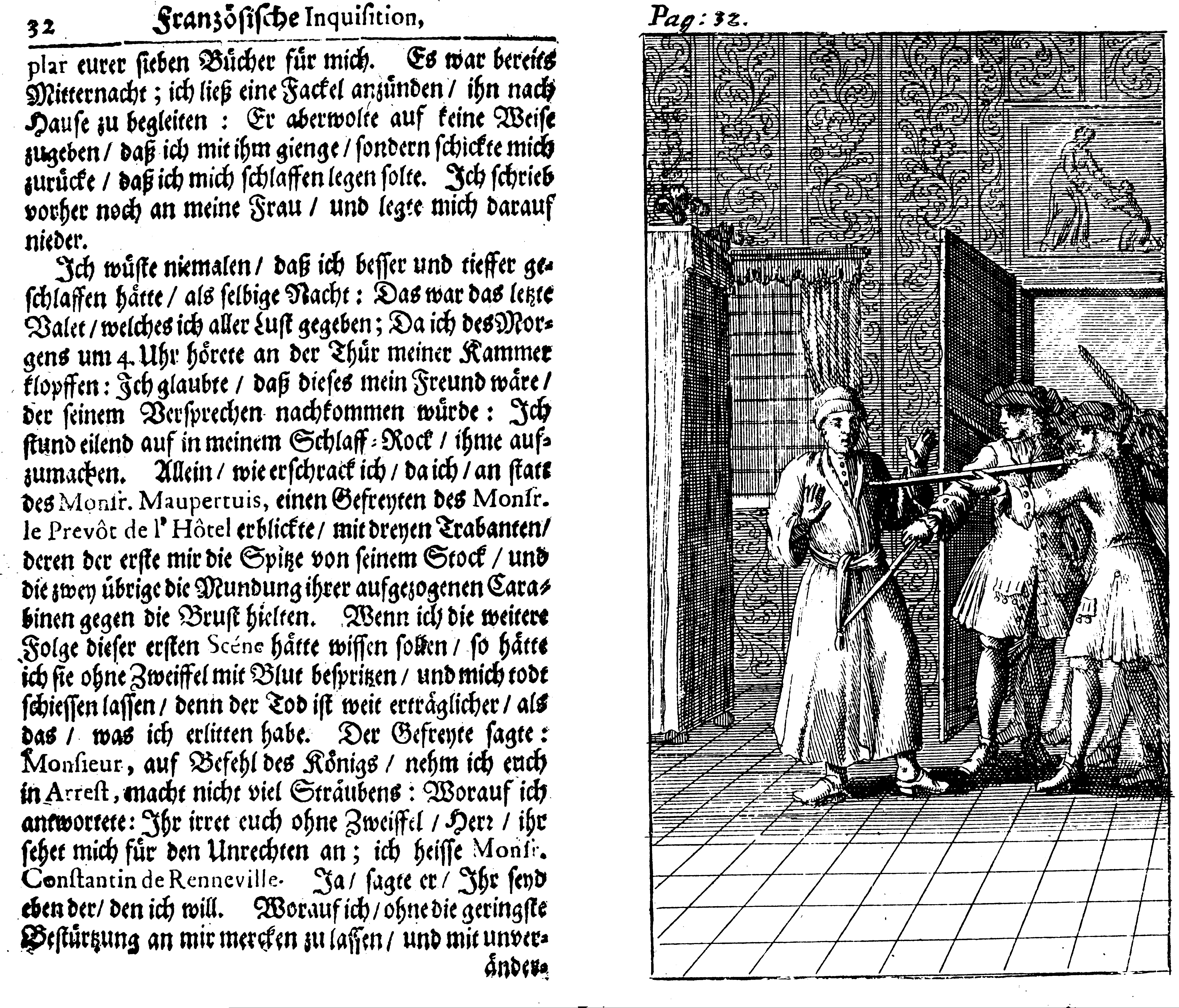
German edition of Renneville's French Inquisition (1715): the author's arrest.

René Auguste Constantin de Renneville (October 9, 1677 – March 13, 1723), was a French writer.

He was born in Caen, Province of Normandy. Because of his Protestant principles, Renneville left France for the Netherlands in 1699. On his return three years later he was denounced as a spy and imprisoned in the Bastille, where he remained until 1713. During his imprisonment he wrote a series of poems on the margins of a copy of Auteurs déguisés (Paris, 1690), which he called Otia bastiliaca. These were rediscovered by James Tregaskis in 1906.

Renneville was freed through the intercession of Queen Anne, and made his way to England. There he wrote his Histoire de la Bastille published in 1715 (volume 1) and 1719 (volumes 1–4 with a new preface) in Amsterdam with Étienne Roger, a publisher who addressed the European market. The publication was dedicated to George I and appeared simultaneously in an abridged English and an illustrated German edition. A Dutch edition followed in 1717. At the time of his death in 1723 he was a major of artillery in the service of the elector of Hesse. His other important work is a Recueil des voyages qui ont servi a l'établissement de la Compagnie des Indes Orientales aux Provinces Unies (10 vols, new ed., Rouen, 1725).

The English version of L'inquisition Françoise is of greater interest as it was published with William Taylor, the publisher Daniel Defoe chose for his Robinson Crusoe in 1719. Both titles eventually shared aspects of realism and romanticization, an interest in the hardly credible "romantic" story of a survivor.

== Works ==
- Cantiques de l’écriture sainte paraphrasés en sonnets (Amsterdam: Étienne Roger, 1703).
- L'inquisition Françoise ou l'histoire de la Bastille. Par Mr. Constantin de Renneville [Vol. 1] (Amsterdam: E. Roger, 1715).

- [German:] Entlarvte und jedermann zur Schau dargestellte französische Inquisition, oder: Geschicht der Bastille ([Nürnberg,] 1715).
- [English, abridged:] The French Inquisition: or, The History of the Bastille in Paris (London: A. Bell/ T. Varnham/ J. Osborne/ W. Taylor/ J. Baker, 1715).
- [Dutch:] Historie van de Bastille of inquisite van Staat in Vrannryk (Amsterdam, 1717).

- Psaumes de la Pénitence paraphrasés en sonnets (La Haye, 1715).
- L'inquisition Françoise ou l'histoire de la Bastille. Par Mr. Constantin de Renneville, 4 Vols. (Amsterdam: E. Roger, 1719).
- L'inquisition françoise : ou, L’histoire de la Bastille (Amsterdam: B. Lakeman/ Leiden: J. & H. Verbeek, 1724).
- Supplément à l’histoire de l’inquisition françoise ou de la Bastille (Amsterdam: Étienne Roger, 1719).
- Poème en vers libre pour le jour de l’heureuse naissance de S.A.S.M. Charles, Landgrave de Hesse (Cassel, 1722).
- Recueil des voiages qui ont servi à l'établissement & aux progrès de la Compagnie des Indes Orientales, formée dans les Provinces-Unies des Païs-Bas (Amsterdam: J. F. Bernard, 1725).
- Œuvres spirituelles contenant diverses poésies chrétiennes (Amsterdam: 1725).
- Anecdotes bas-normandes, 1724, rééd. par Paul Le Cacheux (Évreux: Impr. de l’Eure, 1899).

== Literature ==
- Olaf Simons, Marteaus Europa oder Der Roman, bevor er Literatur wurde (Amsterdam, 2001), p. 647-661.
