= Knight banneret =

Type/rank of knight

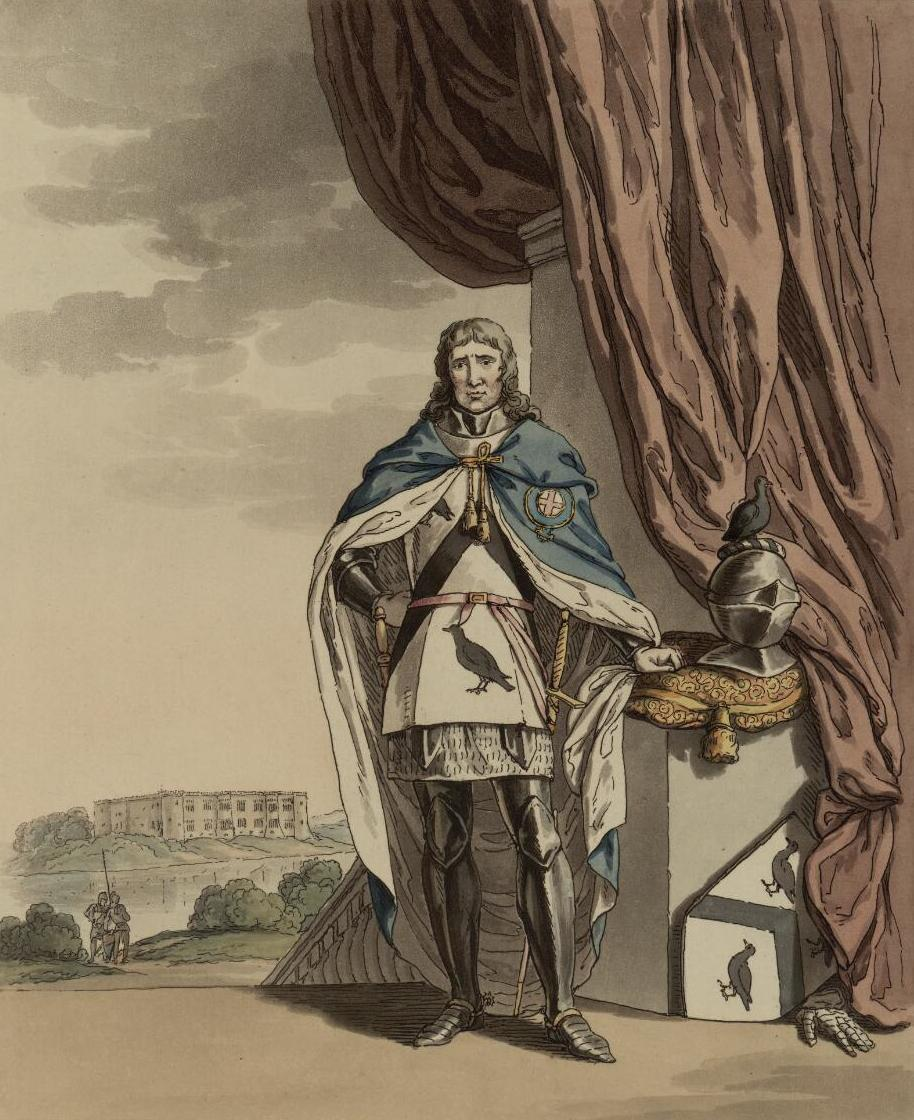
Sir Rhys ap Thomas, who was made a knight banneret in 1497

A knight banneret, sometimes known simply as banneret, was a medieval knight who led a company of troops during time of war under his own banner (which was square-shaped, in contrast to the tapering standard or the pennon flown by the lower-ranking knights) and was eligible to bear supporters in English heraldry. The military rank of a knight banneret was higher than a knight Bachelor (who fought under another's banner), but lower than an earl or duke.

Under English custom the rank of knight banneret could only be conferred by the sovereign on the field of battle. There were some technical exceptions to this; when his standard was on the field of battle he could be regarded as physically present though he was not. His proxy could be regarded as a sufficient substitution for his presence. The wife of a banneret was styled as banneress.

== Origins ==
There were no standing armies in the middle ages (except the military orders). Though modern scholarship has had a lot to say about the varied means by which medieval princes raised their forces, the obligation of a vassal to serve on horseback either in person and (for some) with a contingent raised by his own means is still seen as providing the core of any army of the time. The 'feudal' nature of even this part of the medieval army has been qualified by some, in that many 11th and 12th-century lords gathered under their banners extra knights available for hire for a campaign, men who were disparaged at the time as 'mercenaries'. Even so the 'mesnie' (retained military household) was the elite core of any great lord's following in war and in tournament, and a sign also of his power and dignity. By the early 12th century lords in the field distinguished their personal retinue by a square banner which came to feature the heraldic device associated with their noble lineage. The Old French word for it is 'baniere', derived from the lord's power of command, called in French his 'ban'. It literally meant 'token of authority'.

The idea of the banneret as a distinct and superior category of knight is seen as a consequence of the fact that the great lord who did not possess a hereditary title (like count or duke) found himself on the same social level as the subordinate and dependent knights of his retinue. This became a particular issue in the 12th century, with the growth of the aristocratic tournament culture in north east France and the western Empire. One uncomfortable consequence of this for the untitled lord was the rise in standing of the common knight towards noble status. A solution was to exalt magnate knighthood to a level above that of common knights, and identify it with the banner that a lord could carry, but not a common knight. The first indication of the rank was in the tournament roll compiled after the great royal festival at Lagny-sur-Marne in 1179 where the knights 'carrying a banner' were distinguished from the rest. The title 'banneret' (Latin banneretus, vexillifer; Middle French: banerez) was fully established as a military and social rank by the mid 13th century. Initially the term could be applied collectively to all noblemen qualified to raise a banner (including counts and dukes), but before the end of the 13th century it came to be used exclusively as a senior rank of knight or lesser magnate. The term originated in Francophone aristocratic culture in the later 12th century, but was adopted into other cultures. It was adopted into Flemish by 1300 as 'baenrots', a word explained as from baan (command) and rot (troop). The word was taken into Middle High German as baenritz or bannerheer and was current in the principalities of the Western Empire in the 14th century.

There was in the 14th century a tension between the evolving title of 'baron' as a hereditary dignity and 'banneret' which could be applied to the same lord. It was resolved in part by employing 'baron' for him in a civil context and 'banneret' in a military context, where bannerets could claim a higher rate of pay on campaign than common knights. In the work of the great English antiquaries of the 17th century the banneret is understood as a medieval curiosity though they gave rise to the idea that bannerets were the origin of King James I's order of the baronet. John Selden, however, points out that the "old stories" often have baronetti as synonyms for bannereti and is careful to say that "banneret hath no relation to this later title [of baronet]". The last authentic instance of the creation of knights banneret was by King Charles I to several men at the Battle of Edgehill (1642) including Thomas Strickland of Sizergh for gallantry, and John Smith for rescuing the royal standard from the enemy.

== Later history ==
Whether any further bannerets were granted is debated by historians. George Cokayne notes in The Complete Peerage (1913) that King George II revived the order when he created sixteen knights bannerets on the field of the Battle of Dettingen in 1743, (Note: King George II's 16 bannerets, as recorded by Cokayne, were: the Dukes of Cumberland and Marlborough; the Earls of Stair, Dunmore, Crawford, Rothes and Albemarle; and Generals Honywood, Hawley, Cope, Ligonier, Campbell, Bland, Onslow, Pulteney and Huske.) although his source for this, a diary entry by Gertrude Savile, states "This honour had been laid aside since James I, when Baronets were instituted", which contradicts other sources; a news magazine published in the same year as the battle records the sixteen honours, with the addition of an unnamed 'Trooper who retook the Standard from the French'. Other sources give the name of the trooper as Tom Brown, or 'Trooper Brown', which would bring the number of knights banneret created by George II to seventeen; there seems however to be some doubt as to the historical record. Contemporary celebrations of the battle refer to him as 'Mr', and a later memorial stone erected to Brown by his regiment in 1968 omits the honour.

Several sources, including Edward Brenton (1828) and William James (1827), record that captains Trollope and Fairfax and were honoured with bannerets by King George III for their actions during the Battle of Camperdown (1797). However, these awards were never recorded in The London Gazette and is much more likely that these knighthoods, which first appear in formal records in December 1797 without their nature being specified, were as knights bachelor. (Note: "When the fleet returned to the Nore [George III] signified his intention of visiting it there, and Trollope, as the senior captain, was appointed to the Royal Charlotte yacht to bring him from Greenwich. The king accordingly embarked on 30 Oct.; but the wind came dead foul, and after two days the yacht had got no further than Gravesend. He therefore gave up the idea and returned to Greenwich, knighting Trollope on the quarterdeck of the Royal Charlotte before he landed. The accolade conferred 'under the royal standard' was spoken of as making Trollope a knight banneret, and was apparently so intended by the king; but it is said to have been afterwards decided [by the Privy Council], as a question of precedence, that a knight banneret could only be made on the field where a battle had actually been fought; or presumably, in the case of a naval officer, on the quarterdeck of one of the ships actually engaged".)

Though the title had long fallen into disuse, bannerets and their sons continued to be listed in the table of precedence until at least as late as 1870; those created by the sovereign under the Royal Standard in wartime rank above baronets, whereas those knights banneret not so created by the sovereign in person rank directly below baronets.

On page 364 of the 1990 edition of Dod's Parliamentary Companion, its table of precedence, which includes various long-vacant dignities, has in position 99 "Knights Banneret, created under the royal standard in open war, the Sovereign or the Prince of Wales being present" and in position 104 "Knights Banneret, provided they be not made in the manner described at No. 99. This position was allotted to such as were created by the commanders of armies in the king's name on the open field of battle." The former class of Knights Banneret thus rank below Judges of the High Court of Justice and above younger sons of viscounts and the latter class below baronets and above "Knights of the Thistle, when below the degree of a baron".

In the 1920s, the National Association for the Study and Prevention of Tuberculosis (later the National Tuberculosis Association and now the American Lung Association) in the United States used the Knight Banneret symbolism in its TB efforts. Knight Banneret pins were issued.

== Royal Air Force ==
Following the creation of the Royal Air Force (RAF) in 1918, unique names were devised for most of its commissioned officer ranks. This was reputedly a result of an objection by the Royal Navy to other services adopting any name for a commissioned rank that was already used by the RN. In addition, the RAF ranks also served to distinguish the new service from the British Army and Royal Navy, and to identify individual officers as belonging to the RAF.

"Banneret" was among the names proposed for the RAF equivalent to a naval captain or an army colonel. However, this proposal was rejected and the name group captain was instead adopted.

== See also ==
- List of knights banneret of England
