= Pieter van Gunst =

Dutch draughtsman, copperplate engraver and printmaker

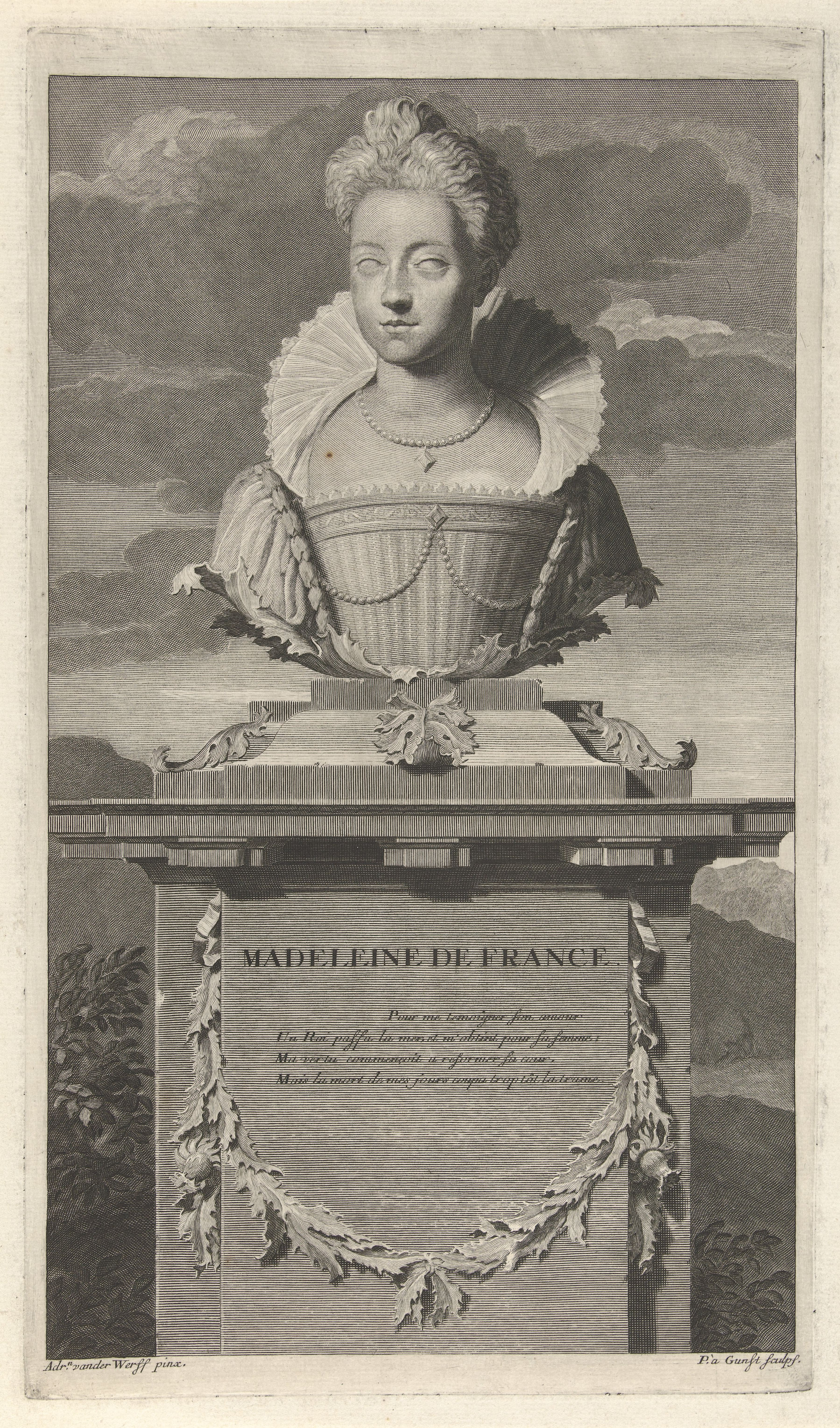
Bust of Magdalene of Valois, Queen of Scotland

Pieter Stevensz. van Gunst (1658/9, Amsterdam - buried 10 November 1732, Amsterdam), also known as Pieter Stevens van Gunst or Petrus Stephani, was a Dutch draughtsman, copperplate engraver and printmaker active in Amsterdam, London (1704), and the Dutch town of Nederhorst (1730-1731).

== Life ==
Not much is known of his life. He was born in Amsterdam in 1658 or 1659 as the son of Steven Hesselsz and Judith Sieuwerts. In 1687 he married in Amsterdam one Leonora Baarselmans from The Hague. In 1712 he joined the Amsterdam book sellers' guild as an art dealer. He was buried on 10 November 1732 in the Westerkerk church in Amsterdam. The engraver Gilliam van der Gouwen worked for some time as an assistant in his workshop.

His son, Pieter van Gunst Junior, is often confused with his father because he not only shared the same name but also worked as an engraver. The son was also a poet. In 1736 he published a series of psalms set to rhyme, CL psalmen des profeeten Davids, a project which took him 18 years to complete. A second son called Philipp van Gunst was an etcher/engraver.

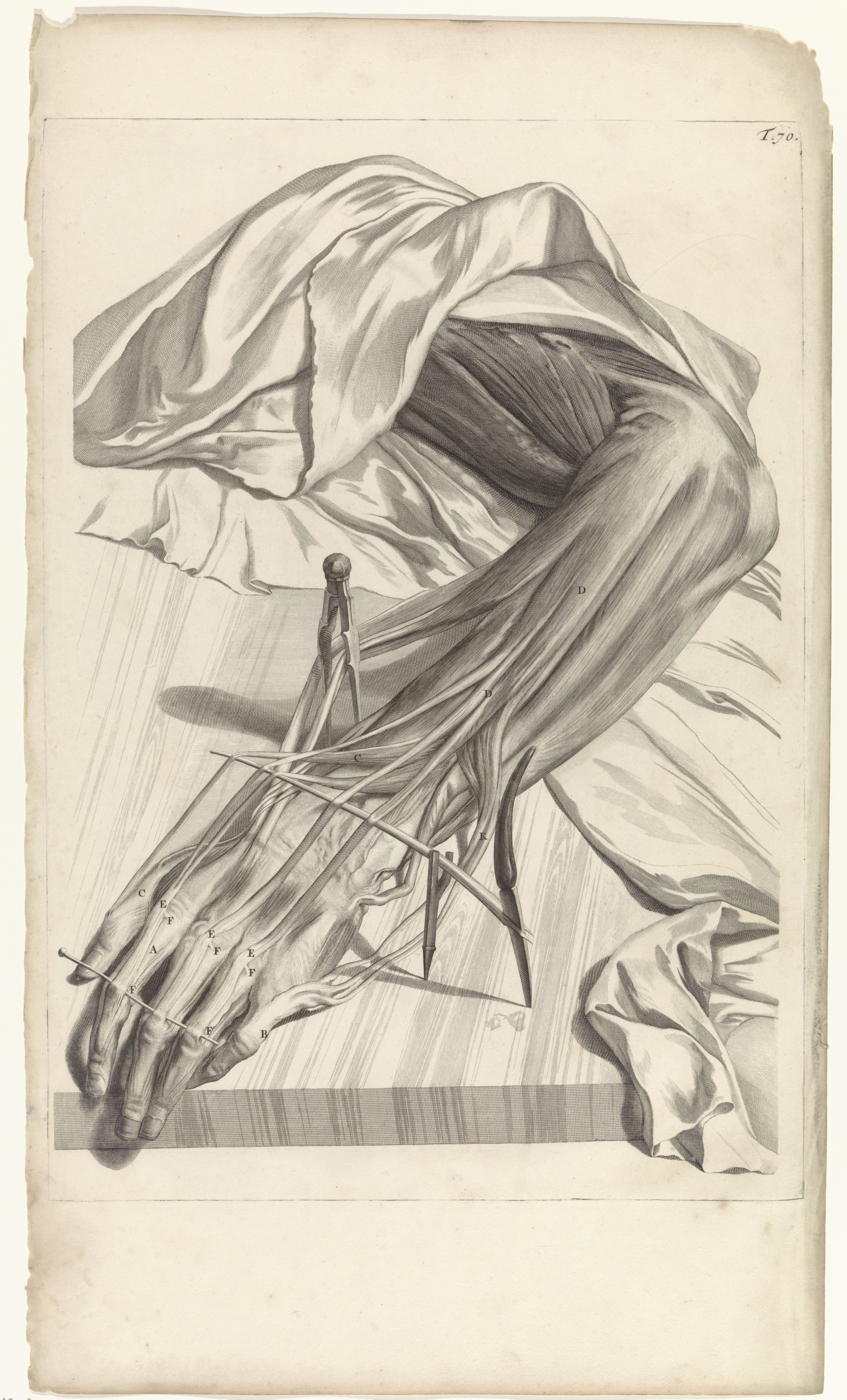
Anatomical study of the muscles and tendons of the left hand

== Work ==
Van Gunst produced a number of engravings, mainly portraits, including copies of work by Anthony van Dyck. He also made a series of illustrations for historical treatises by Isaac de Larrey and engravings of drawings by Gerard de Lairesse to illustrate Govert Bidloo's Anatomia Humani Corporis.

In 1713-1715 he engraved a set of ten plates after paintings by van Dyck from the collection of Philip Wharton, 1st Duke of Wharton. These plates were commissioned by a syndicate of British art dealers (Cock, Comyns and McSwiny), who employed Jacob Houbraken to come to Britain in 1713 to make the drawings and van Gunst to engrave them in Amsterdam. The set of ten plates was advertised in the London Gazette on 13 December 1715.

Prints of engravings by Van Gunst are in the collections of the Rijksmuseum in Amsterdam, Museum Boijmans van Beuningen in Rotterdam, the British Museum and the National Portrait Gallery in London, among others.
