= Reay (disambiguation) =

Reay is a Scottish village.

Reay may also refer to:

== People ==
- Alan Reay (British Army officer) (1925–2012), Director General Army Medical Services
- Alan Reay (engineer) (born 1941), New Zealand structural and civil engineer
- Archie Reay (1901–1962), English footballer
- Barry Reay (born 1950), New Zealand historian
- Beccy Gordon Hunter-Reay (born 1978), American off-road racer, pit-reporter, and model
- Bella Reay (1900–1979), English football player
- Billy Reay (1918–2004), Canadian ice hockey player and coach
- Cairine Reay Wilson (1885–1962), Canadian politician
- David Reay, British climate change scientist
- David Reay (pilot) (born 1946), American pilot of Ryan International Airlines Flight 590
- David Reay Palmer (born 1941), American science fiction author
- Diane Reay, English sociologist and academic
- George Reay (1900–1970), English footballer
- George Adam Reay (1901–1971), Scottish biochemist and fish technologist
- George Agnew Reay (1798–1879), English organist and organ builder
- Gilly Reay (1887–1967), English cricketer
- Gord Reay (1943–2000), Canadian army officer
- Harold Reay (1896–1959), English footballer
- Ian Reay Mackay (1922–2020), Australian immunologist
- James Reay Fraser (1908–1970), Australian politician
- Joseph Reay Greene (1836–1903), Irish zoologist
- Marie Reay (1922–2004), Australian anthropologist
- Mark Reay, American fashion photographer
- Melanie Reay (born c. 1981), English football manager
- Phil Reay-Smith, British communications director
- Reay Tannahill (1929–2007), British historian and author
- Ryan Hunter-Reay (born 1980), American racing driver
- Samuel Reay (1828–1905), English organist and composer
- Shaun Reay (born 1989), English footballer
- Stephen Reay (1782–1861), Scottish academic and clergyman
- Ted Reay (1914–1992), English footballer
- Thomas Reay (1834–1914), English cricketer and clergyman
- Wilfrid Reay (1891−1915), English cricketer and army officer
- William Thomas Reay (1858–1929), Australian journalist and politician

== Places ==
- Khtum Reay Lech, a Cambodian village
- Reay Boathouse, Three Lakes, Wisconsin, United States
- Reay Country, another name for Strathnaver, a valley in Scotland
- Reay E. Sterling Middle School, Quincy, Massachusetts, United States
- Reay forest, a deer stalking estate in Sutherland, Scotland
- Reay Parish Church, Caithness, Scotland
- Reay Road railway station, Mumbai, India

== Other ==
- Lord Reay, a Scottish title
- Reay Fencibles, a Scottish military corps
