= 1974 Sutton London Borough Council election =

The 1974 Sutton Council election took place on 2 May 1974 to elect members of Sutton London Borough Council in London, England. The whole council was up for election and the Conservative Party stayed in overall control of the council.

== Sutton & Cheam ==
Belmont (2)
Party	Candidate	Votes	%	±%
Conservative	John Charles Cox*	1895		
Conservative	Alan George Deards	1869		
Liberal	J H F Biffin	862		
Liberal	J A Illsley	859		
Labour	Charles M Harkin	224		
Labour	Malcolm C Smith	214		
Majority				
Turnout				
Conservative hold		Swing		
Conservative hold		Swing		

Cheam North (2)
Party	Candidate	Votes	%	±%
Liberal	M D Baldwin	1165	42.9	n/a
Liberal	Mrs Joan Crowhurst	1113		
Conservative	A R Green	1074	39.5	−10.2
Conservative	D Worthington	1050		
Labour	J F Bell	479	17.6	−32.7
Labour	Mrs May Jackson	464		
Majority			3.3	
Turnout			54.3	+16.2
Liberal gain from Conservative		Swing	+5.1	
Liberal gain from Labour		Swing	+16.3	

Cheam South (2)
Party	Candidate	Votes	%	±%
Conservative	Edward G Trevor	2157		
Conservative	Kenneth A Rose	2127		
Liberal	G R Watkin	578		
Liberal	A R Craske	576		
Labour	David Jarman	108		
Labour	C Thompson	82		
Majority				
Turnout				
Conservative hold		Swing		

Cheam West (2)
Party	Candidate	Votes	%	±%
Conservative	Herbert A Bennett	1264		
Conservative	Stuart A Walker	1252		
Liberal	Mrs Elizabeth M Sharp	1096		
Liberal	P A Thomas	991		
Labour	D Banks	169		
Labour	Mrs D M I Anscombe	166		
Majority				
Turnout				
Conservative hold		Swing		

Sutton Central (2)
Party	Candidate	Votes	%	±%
Liberal	Graham Norman Tope	1273	53.1	
Liberal	Mrs J C Thomas	1073		
Labour	James Kenneth Rhodes*	620	25.9	
Labour	Eric C Marshall*	605		
Conservative	Richard T Barber	504	21.0	
Conservative	Mrs Lesley D Symonds	477		
Majority			27.2	
Turnout			60.0	+17.1
Liberal gain from Labour		Swing	+19.4	

Sutton East (2)
Party	Candidate	Votes	%	±%
Labour	Mrs Evelyn M McEwen	825		
Labour	Donald B Hopkins	769		
Conservative	A P Phillips	625		
Conservative	B E Coombs	605		
Liberal	D F Pell	531		
Liberal	Miss Jill L Servian	521		
Majority				
Turnout				
Labour hold		Swing		

Sutton North (2)
Party	Candidate	Votes	%	±%
Conservative	Leslie R G Brown	980		
Conservative	Stephen J Langley	974		
Liberal	Mrs P A Marlborough	904		
Liberal	John A Phillimore	842		
Labour	D R Cornell	467		
Labour	Mrs D K Knibbs	449		
Majority				
Turnout				
Conservative hold		Swing		

Sutton North East (2)
Party	Candidate	Votes	%	±%
Liberal	M J Parker	1061	39.2	
Liberal	Donald E Strong	1052		
Conservative	Clifford C G Carter	879	32.4	−14.9
Conservative	D A Drane	844		
Labour	Mrs Pauline M Brennan*	769	28.4	−24.3
Labour	Ronald S Williams*	721		
Majority			6.7	12.1
Turnout			52.4	+17.2
Liberal gain from Labour		Swing	+6.0	

Sutton South (2)
Party	Candidate	Votes	%	±%
Conservative	Mrs Marjorie R Grimes	1206		
Conservative	Nicholas J Ferrier	1202		
Liberal	W A Neil	786		
Liberal	C Clark	779		
Labour	A L Clark	250		
Labour	Richard K Anscombe	244		
Majority				
Turnout				
Conservative hold		Swing		

Sutton South East (2)
Party	Candidate	Votes	%	±%
Conservative	Miss F A Blackler	1479		
Conservative	Robin C Squire	1439		
Liberal	P B Donner	627		
Liberal	Mrs E C Harrold	584		
Labour	Mrs Ada Pinkney	136		
Labour	H Wright	124		
Majority				
Turnout				
Conservative hold		Swing		

Worcester Park North (2)
Party	Candidate	Votes	%	±%
Conservative	Mrs Jessie M Ryder	1305		
Conservative	J R Belcher	1295		
Liberal	David F Stockwell	1155		
Liberal	A Wenham-Prosser	1127		
Labour	M J Wadsworth	807		
Labour	Philip A Evers	802		
Majority				
Turnout				
Conservative hold		Swing		

Worcester Park South (2)
Party	Candidate	Votes	%	±%
Conservative	Richard Anthony Kerslake*	1307		
Conservative	David J H Trafford	1269		
Liberal	John Aubrey Mullin	1190		
Liberal	A F Horner	1176		
Labour	Mrs S K Burridge	293		
Labour	J Burridge	284		
Majority				
Turnout				
Conservative hold		Swing		

== Carshalton ==
=== Beddington North ===
Beddington North (2)
Party	Candidate	Votes	%	±%
Residents	D.J. Farthing	784	36.2	
Labour	G Eve*			
Residents				
Labour				
Conservative				
Conservative				
Majority				
Turnout				
Residents gain from Labour		Swing		

=== Beddington South ===
Beddington South (2)
Party	Candidate	Votes	%	±%
Conservative				
Conservative				
Labour	P.L. Spalding*			
Labour				
Residents	Mrs R.E.G. Haydon			
Residents				
Liberal				
Liberal				
Communist				
Majority				
Turnout				
Conservative gain from Labour		Swing		

=== Carshalton Central ===
Carshalton Central (2)
Party	Candidate	Votes	%	±%
Conservative				
Conservative	Dennis Hedley T. Salari*			
Labour				
Labour				
Liberal				
Liberal				
Turnout				
Conservative hold		Swing		
