= Thomas Whittle =

Thomas Whittle may refer to:

- Thomas Whittle (martyr) (died 1556), English Protestant martyr
- Thomas Whittle (poet) (1683–1736), Tyneside poet/songwriter, artist and eccentric
- Thomas Whittle the Elder (1803–1887), English landscape and still life artist
- Thomas Levi Whittle (1812–1868), early Mormon pioneer
