= Edward Darcy =

English politician and courtier

Sir Edward Darcy (Darcey, Darsey; 1543/1544 – 28 October 1612) was an English politician and courtier. His monopoly by way of having a wide patent on playing cards was declared illegal in 1602.

He has an alternative title: Sir Edward Darcy/Darcey/Darsey of Stainforth, West Riding of Yorkshire.

== Background and career ==
Darcy was the eldest son of Mary Carew (daughter of Sir Nicholas Carew) and of Sir Arthur Darcy (the son of Thomas Darcy, 1st Baron Darcy of Darcy). He was educated at Trinity College, Cambridge before being admitted to the Inner Temple in 1561. He was a Member of Parliament for Truro, Cornwall from 1584 to 1585.

In 1579 he was a groom of the Privy Chamber to Elizabeth I. In 1589 the Queen granted the reversion of the manors of Epsom and Ashtead to him as Sir Francis Carew's nephew, which matured in 1612 on the latter's death. In 1595 he received the manor of Stainforth Underbargh and 20 dwelling houses with lands there.

Queen Elizabeth granted Darcy an exclusive patent in 1598 for the manufacture, importation, and sales of playing cards. The Court of Queen's Bench four years later, held the patent invalid in the landmark case Darcy v Allein ("The Case of Monopolies").

Knighted on 23 April 1603, Sir Edward died 28 October 1612, aged 69.

== Family ==
Edward Darcy married Elizabeth, a daughter of Thomas Astley of Writtle, another groom of Elizabeth's privy chamber, in July 1579.

Their children included:

- Robert Darcy M. Mary d. 1618;
  - Edward Darcy (parted with manors);
- Christopher Darcy D. 1623;
- Isabella Darcy (1600-1669), married John Launce (b. abt. 1597) around 1619, son of Robert Launce and Susan Tubb.
