= Nicholas Carew (Henry VIII courtier) =

English politician (c.1496–1539)

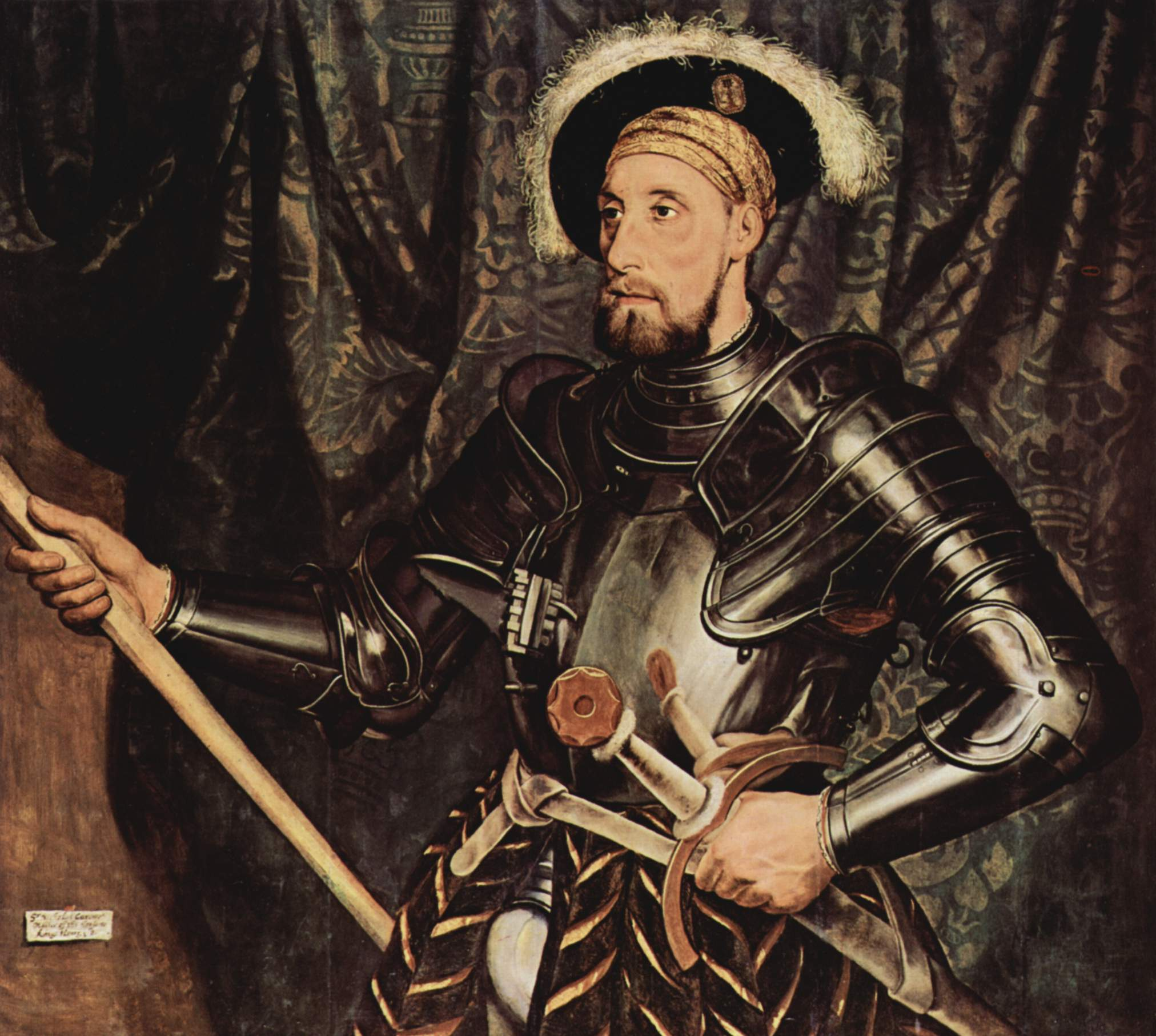
- Sir Nicholas Carew
- Successor: Sir Francis Carew
- Born: c. 1496; Carew Manor, Beddington, Surrey.
- Died: 3 March 1539; Tower Hill, London, England.
- Residence: Carew Manor
- Spouse: Elizabeth Bryan
- Issue: Mary Carew, Lady Darcy; Anne Carew, Lady Throckmorton; Elizabeth Carew; Sir Francis Carew; Isabel Carew-Saunders
- Parents: Sir Richard Carew; Malyn Oxenbridge

Sir Nicholas Carew KG (c. 1496 – 3 March 1539), of Beddington in Surrey, was an English courtier and diplomat during the reign of King Henry VIII. He was executed for his alleged part in the Exeter Conspiracy.

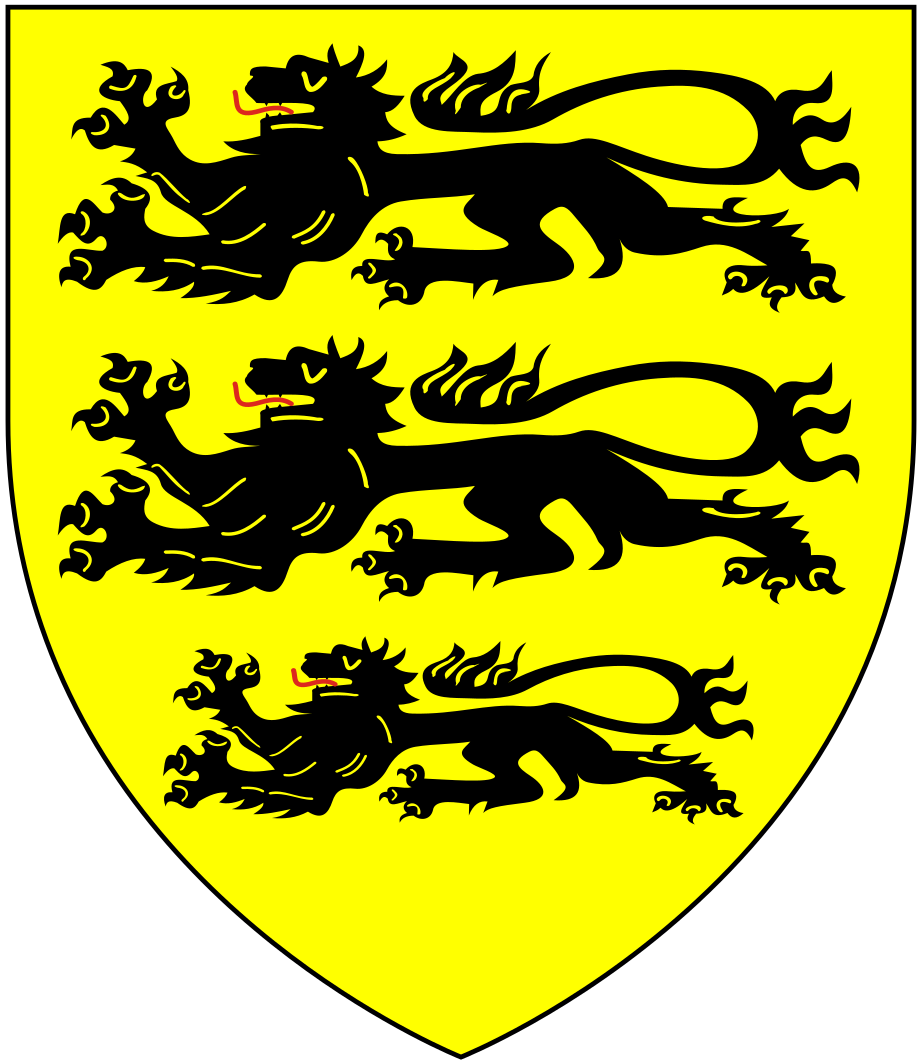
Arms of Carew: Or, three lions passant in pale sable

== Early career ==
Nicholas Carew was the son of Sir Richard Carew, Captain of Calais (1469 – May 23, 1520) and Malyn Oxenbridge, the daughter of Sir Robert Oxenbridge (1414 – 1486) of Brede, Sussex. When he was six years of age, he was placed in the household of the future King Henry VIII of England, and shared Henry's education. In the early years of Henry's reign, Carew came to prominence at court through his skill at jousting, and was renowned for his fearlessness. By 1515, Carew's fame in the lists was such that the King provided him with his own tiltyard at Greenwich. He was knighted sometime before 1517. He was a prominent member of the Court and held the position of Master of the Horse, as well as other prominent offices such as Master of the Forests, Lieutenant of Ruysbank (guarding Calais harbour), and Chief Esquire of the King. He was a close friend of the King and was made a Knight of the Garter in 1536.

Sir Nicholas was sent to France twice as part of a diplomatic mission, once in January 1521, and was reputedly well received by King Francis I of France. His second mission to France took place in 1524 to have English presence at the peace talks between King Francis and Charles V, Holy Roman Emperor.

Carew was popular with King Henry VIII, who sought his company, but was known in his youth for being something of a rake. He was one of a number of King Henry's companions whom Cardinal Wolsey believed had too much influence over the King. In 1518, Wolsey managed to have Carew sent away from court, replacing him with his own protégé, Richard Pace. He soon returned, but was removed again, to Ruysbank Tower, Calais, in 1519, when he was also High Sheriff of Surrey and Sussex. In 1521 he was made constable of Wallingford Castle, together with the stewardship of Wallingford. Wolsey finally engineered Carew's dismissal from the Privy chamber, when he presented the Eltham ordinances of 1526.

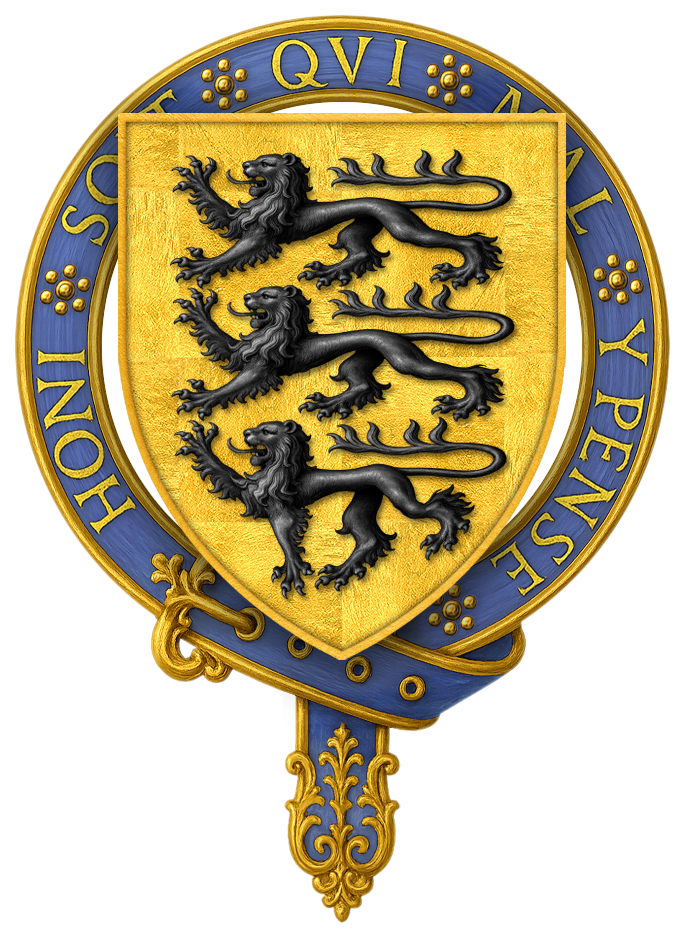
Garter-encircled arms of Sir Nicholas Carew, KG

== Statesman and conspirator ==
In 1522, Carew succeeded Sir Henry Guildford as Master of the Horse, a post he held until his death. In the following years, he was frequently sent on embassies to Paris. Francis I developed a high regard for Carew, and urged Henry to advance him; the self-avowed 'reprobate' was now a sober politician. In January 1528, to Wolsey's dismay, Sir Nicholas was restored to the Privy chamber, possibly through the influence of his relative, Anne Boleyn, to whom he was related via a common ancestor, their great-great-grandfather, Thomas Hoo, Baron Hoo and Hastings.

However, Carew started to resent the way Anne used her position as the King's mistress, revealing his sympathy for Queen Katherine and the Princess Mary to the imperial ambassador, Eustace Chapuys. In 1531, angry at the way she had treated his friends Sir Henry Guildford and the Duke of Suffolk, he began working against her. These manoeuvres culminated in 1536, when the reformist Thomas Cromwell made common cause with religious conservatives, such as Carew, to bring Queen Anne down. At this time, Henry chose Carew to fill a vacancy in the Order of the Garter, thus fulfilling a promise made to Francis I.

Following the dissolution of the monasteries in 1537, the King granted Carew the manor of Coulsdone that had previously belonged to the monastery of Chertsey.

== Downfall ==
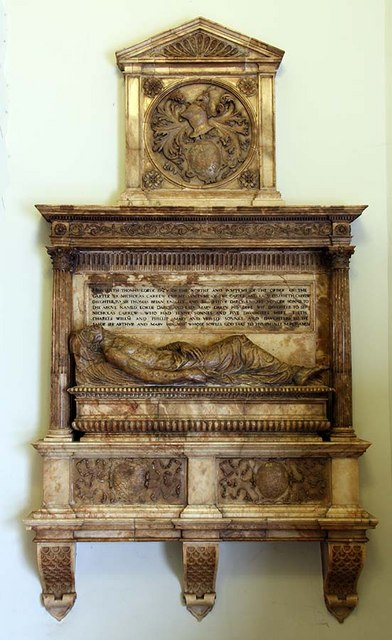
Monument to Sir Nicholas Carew in St Botolph-without-Aldgate, London

In late 1538, Cromwell was forced by King Henry to move against the Exeters, and against his ally Carew. Carew was already out of favour at court, having responded angrily to an insult made by the king. Questionable historians suggest that Ambassador Chapuys perceived that the real cause of his downfall was likely the championing of Princess Mary. When Cromwell was presented with apparently treasonous letters which Carew had written, King Henry VIII believed that Carew had been involved in the Exeter Conspiracy, a plot to depose him and place Cardinal Reginald Pole on the throne in his stead. Carew was thus arrested and stood trial on 14 February 1539, and he was found guilty of high treason.

"... charges that Sir Nic. Carewe of Bedyngton alias of Westminster, knowing the said Marquis to be a traitor, did, 20 Aug, 1537, at Westhorseley, Surr., and at other times, falsely abet the said Marquis, and, 24 Aug 1537, and at other times, had conversations with him about the change of the world, and also with his own hand wrote him divers letters, at Bedyngton, 4 Sept 1537 and at other times, and the said Marquis at that or other times sent divers traitorous letters to the said Carewe from Westhorseley which the said Carewe traitorously received, which letters they afterwards, to conceal their treason, traitorously burnt at Westhorseley and Bedyngton, 1 Sept, 1539 and at other times; and afterwards, knowing that the said Marquis was indicted as aforesaid, 29 Nov, 1539 the said Carewe at Bedyngton traitorously said these words in English, "I marvel greatly that the indictment against the lord Marquis was so secretly handled and for what purpose, for the like was never seen".

Sir Nicholas Carew was beheaded on 3 March 1539 at Tower Hill. According to a letter by John Butler, the last words of Carew as he was led to execution, amounted to exhorting all to study the evangelical books, as he had fallen by hatred to the Gospel.

His estate at Beddington, including Carew Manor, was granted after his execution to Walter Gorges, and then later after his death to Thomas Darcy, 1st Baron Darcy of Chiche. Carew's only son, Sir Francis Carew, later managed to attain a reversal of his father's attainder, but did not receive his estates, and purchased the Beddington estate from Lord Darcy. Beddington Park, reduced in area, continued to be owned by the Carew family, into the 20th century; two heiresses in the lineage chose to adopt for their sons the name and arms of Carew.

Carew's estate at Coulsdon was joined to the honour (set of manors) of Hampton Court. In her first year of reign, Queen Mary I granted the estate to Carew's son, to be held in chief by the service of one-fortieth part of a knight's fee. In 1589, owing to the imminent default of male heirs, Queen Elizabeth I granted the Coulsdon estate to Carew's grandson, Edward Darcy (the son of his daughter, Mary Carew), who was knighted in 1603.

== Marriage and children ==
Sir Nicholas Carew married Sir Francis Bryan's sister, Elizabeth Bryan, the daughter of Sir Thomas Bryan and Margaret Bourchier. Sir Francis Bryan was part of the trial committee against Carew which left his own sister Elizabeth impoverished.

Sir Nicholas and Elizabeth had the following children:

- Mary Carew, who married Sir Arthur Darcy (c. 1495 – 1561), son of Thomas Darcy, 1st Baron Darcy of Darcy. Their eldest son was Sir Edward Darcy of Stainforth, Yorkshire.
- Anne Carew, who married the diplomat Sir Nicholas Throckmorton. Their daughter, Elizabeth Throckmorton, later married Sir Walter Raleigh. Anne married secondly, Adrian Stokes.
- Elizabeth Carew (born c. 1525)
- Sir Francis Carew, only son and heir, who was restored to his father's estates during the reign of Queen Mary I, though he generally preferred to stay out of politics.
- Isabel Carew, who married Nicholas Saunders (1530 – 1587) of Ewell, Surrey, the son of William Saunders and half-brother of Nicholas Mynne, and had issue, including Sir Nicholas Saunders.
