= Municipal Borough of Beddington and Wallington =

Former local government area in the UK

Coordinates: 51.361°N 0.138°W

Beddington and Wallington
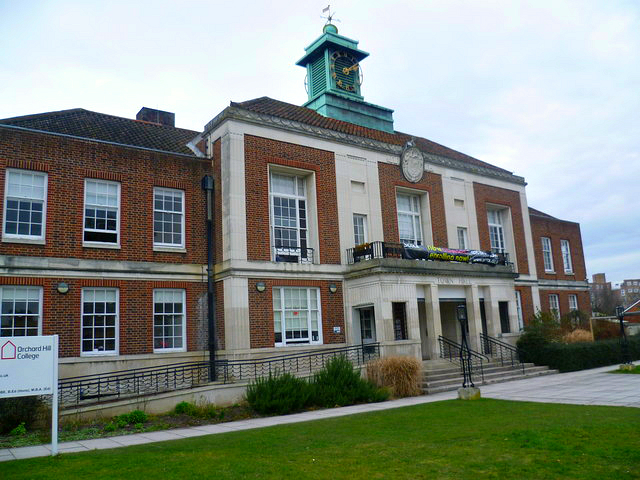
- Wallington Town Hall, seat of the district council from 1934 until 1965, and now used as a college
- Area
  - 1921: 3,040 acres (12.3 km^{2})
  - 1931: 3,042 acres (12.31 km^{2})
  - 1961: 3,045 acres (12.32 km^{2})
- Population
  - 1921: 14,322
  - 1931: 26,251
  - 1961: 32,603
- History
  - Created: 1915
  - Abolished: 1965
  - Succeeded by: London Borough of Sutton
- Status: Urban district (until 1937); Municipal borough (after 1937)
- Government
  - HQ: Wallington
  - Motto: Per Ardua Ad Summa (Through Difficulties to the Heights)

Beddington and Wallington was, from 1915 to 1965, a local government district in north east Surrey, England. It formed part of the London suburbs, lying within the Metropolitan Police District and the London Passenger Transport Area. In 1965 it was abolished on the creation of Greater London.

== Urban district ==
The urban district was created on 1 April 1915, and consisted of the civil parishes of Beddington and Wallington. The parishes had previously formed part of Croydon Rural District, but the rural district was broken up by an order made by Surrey County Council on 13 September 1913 and confirmed by the Local Government Board on 18 November 1914. The neighbouring County Borough of Croydon made an attempt to annex Beddington, but its private bill was defeated in parliament.

The urban district council was initially based at 37 Manor Road, the former offices of Wallington Parish Council. In 1929 they purchased a house on Woodcote Road, Wallington, as the site of a new town hall. The architect chosen was Robert Atkinson, and the building was formally opened on 21 September 1934.

== Incorporation ==
In March 1936 the urban district council petitioned the privy council for the grant of a charter of incorporation to become a municipal borough. The petition was successful, and the royal charter was presented to the charter mayor, Sir Richard Meller MP by Lord Ashcombe, the Lord Lieutenant of Surrey at a ceremony in Beddington Park attended by 10,000 people on 15 September 1937.

== Borough council ==
The council had a membership of twenty-eight, comprising twenty-one councillors and seven aldermen. The councillors had a three-year term, with seven retiring annually. Aldermen had a six-year term, with half being chosen by the council every three years. The council elected one its members to the office of mayor annually. Elections were suspended from 1939 to 1944 due to the Second World War.

From its first election in 1937 the borough council was under independent control. The Conservative Party, which was dominant in parliamentary politics in the area, did not contest elections in the borough, so that the nominal "independents" were generally elected by Conservative supporters. The first council election took place on 1 November 1937, and resulted in councillors being elected under the "Independent", "Ratepayers' Association" or "Residents' Association" labels. The Labour Party failed to have any councillors elected. The three groups on the council subsequently formed a single Independent bloc, and held all seats on the council until 1952. In that year there was a nationwide swing to Labour, and the party had two councillors elected, against twenty-six independent councillors and aldermen. Until 1960 there was a small Labour group on the council, never having more than three members. In that year the Independents regained all seats on the council. In the following years both Labour and a resurgent Liberal Party were able to gain a foothold on the council. After the final elections in 1963 the strength of the parties was: Independent 20, Labour 5, Liberal 3.

== Public services ==
The Municipal Year Book 1940 listed the services provided by the council at that date. These included a public library, a fire brigade and the provision of seventeen pleasure grounds and open spaces. The council was also the joint owner (with Coulsdon and Purley Urban District Council) of Bandon Hill Cemetery. The borough's fire brigade passed to the National Fire Service in 1941, later becoming the responsibility of Surrey County Council.

== Coat of arms ==
The borough council was granted arms by the College of Arms on 3 July 1937. Across the centre of the shield was a "fess embattled", representing the fortified walls of the reputed Roman town of Noviomagus at Woodcote. The Tudor roses stood for Henry VIII and Elizabeth I who visited the seat of the Carew family of Beddington. The small shield or "inescutcheon" in the centre of the arms bore an aeroplane flying over a rising sun. This recorded the presence of Croydon Airport in south Beddington. The blue and gold border denoted that the district formed part of Surrey, and was derived from the arms of the de Warenne family, sometime Earls of Surrey. The crest above the shield was an armoured arm in the act of throwing down a gauntlet. This recalled that the manor of Wallington was anciently held by the Dymock family, who were Hereditary Champions of England.

== Abolition ==
The borough was abolished in 1965 by the London Government Act 1963, with its area becoming part of the London Borough of Sutton in Greater London.
