= South Beddington and Roundshaw =

Electoral ward in London, England

- Electoral ward for the Sutton London Borough Council
- Borough: London Borough of Sutton
- County: Greater London
- Population: 11,018 (2021)
- Major settlements: Beddington, Roundshaw
- Area: 2.960 km²

Current electoral ward
- Created: 2022
- Seats: 3

South Beddington and Roundshaw is an electoral ward in the London Borough of Sutton. The ward was first used in the 2022 elections and elects three councillors to Sutton London Borough Council.

== Geography ==
The ward is named after the suburb of South Beddington and Roundshaw.

== Councillors ==
| Election | Councillors | | |
|---|---|---|---|
| 2022 | Jonathan Pearce (Conservative Party) | Edward Joyce (Liberal Democrats) | Patrick Magnus (Conservative Party) |

== Elections ==
=== 2022 ===
South Beddington & Roundshaw (3)
| Party | Candidate | Votes | % | ±% |
|---|---|---|---|---|
| Conservative | Jonathan Pearce | 1,232 | 42.0 | |
| Liberal Democrats | Edward Joyce* | 1,201 | 40.9 | |
| Conservative | Patrick Magnus | 1,188 | 40.5 | |
| Conservative | Ryan Stoneman* | 1,183 | 40.3 | |
| Liberal Democrats | Drew Heffernan* | 1,166 | 39.8 | |
| Liberal Democrats | Srividhya Koteeswaran | 1,101 | 37.5 | |
| Labour | Jacqueline McLoughlin | 434 | 14.8 | |
| Labour | David Towler | 377 | 12.9 | |
| Labour | Kiran Nawaz | 372 | 12.7 | |
| Green | Helene McDonagh | 192 | 6.5 | |
| Independent | Hannah Hamilton | 147 | 5.0 | |
| Independent | Katie Bickel | 103 | 3.5 | |
| Independent | Joseph Prowse | 70 | 2.4 | |
| SDP | Steven Kelleher | 33 | 1.1 | |
| Turnout | | | | |
| Conservative win (new seat) | | | | |
| Liberal Democrats win (new seat) | | | | |
| Conservative win (new seat) | | | | |

== See also ==
- List of electoral wards in Greater London
