= Thomas Whittle the Elder =

English painter

- Born: Thomas Whittle; 1803; Beddington, Surrey, England
- Died: 1887 (aged 83–84)
- Occupation: painter
- Known for: landscape and still life paintings
- Parents: Thomas Whittle (father); Mary Whittle (mother)

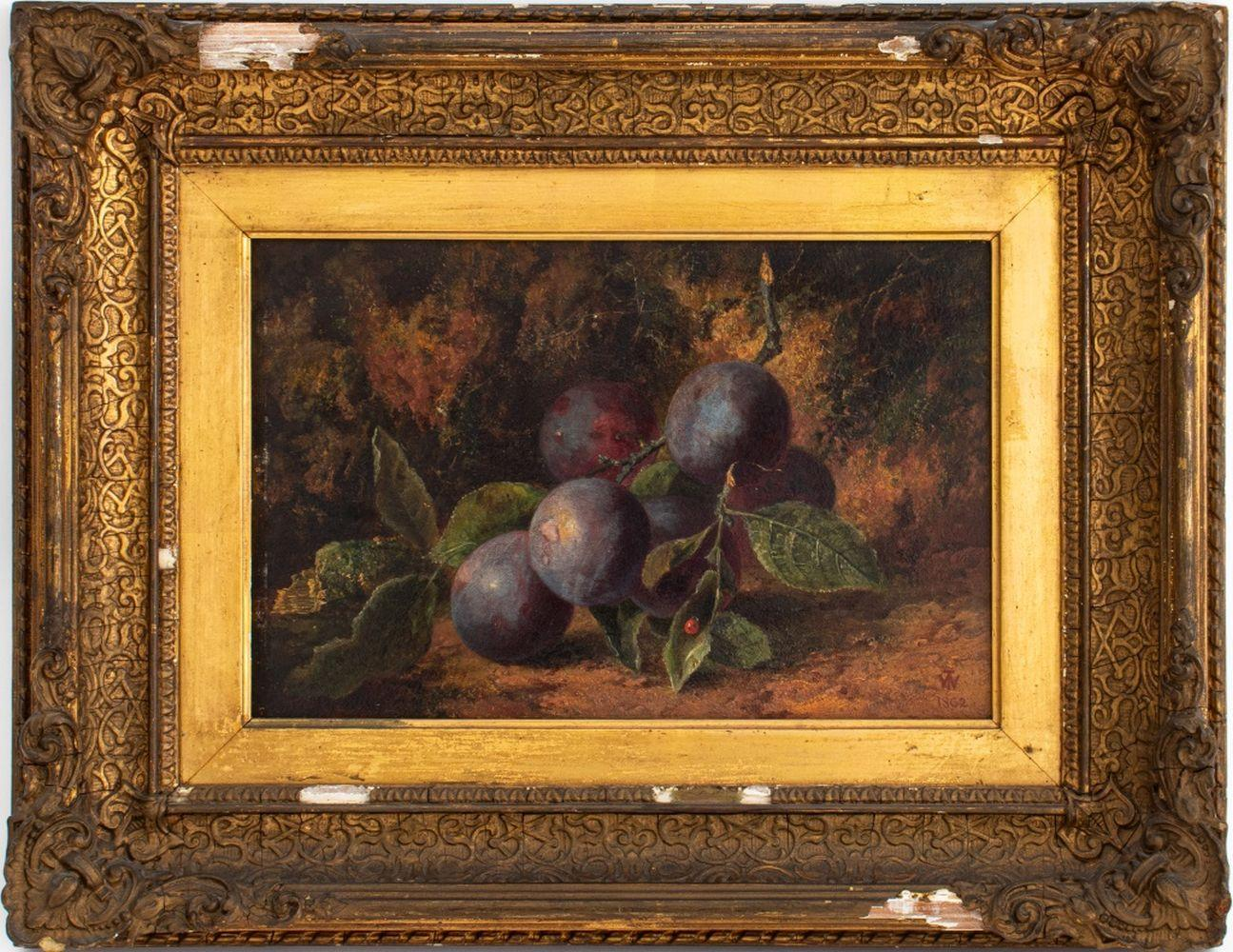
Thomas Whittle the Elder, "A Bit From The Old Plum Tree", Oil on Board, 1862

Thomas Whittle (1803–1887) was an English landscape and still life artist.

== Early life ==
Thomas Whittle was born in Beddington, Surrey to Thomas and Mary Whittle. He was christened on 6 November 1803. Whittle's father and son were also both named Thomas; this one was generally known as "Thomas Whittle the Elder" because his son was also an artist but his father was not.

== Career ==
A largely self-taught artist, Whittle also worked as a journeyman, furniture dealer, clerk and draper. He was not a wealthy man and during his lifetime did not make much money from his art. Often it can be hard to distinguish between Whittle and his son as they both had similar styles. Thomas Whittle the Elder often painted still lives of fruit and sometimes landscapes such as mountains or lakes.
