= Wilfrid Reay =

English cricketer and British Army officer

Personal information
- Full name: Wilfrid Francis Reay
- Born: 12 June 1891; Wallington, Surrey, England
- Died: 8 October 1915 (aged 24); Thiepval, Somme, France
- Batting: Unknown
- Bowling: Unknown-arm fast-medium
- Relatives: Gilly Reay (brother)

Career statistics
Competition	First-class
Matches	1
Runs scored	5
Batting average	–
100s/50s	–/–
Top score	5*
Balls bowled	66
Wickets	1
Bowling average	51.00
5 wickets in innings	–
10 wickets in match	–
Best bowling	1/51
Catches/stumpings	–/–
- Source: Cricinfo, 22 June 2019

Wilfrid Francis Reay (12 June 1891 − 8 October 1915) was an English first-class cricketer and British Army officer.

== Biography ==
The son of J. H. Reay, a civil servant, he was born at Wallington in June 1891. He worked in the London Stock Exchange as an authorised clerk, and was married to Dorothy Katherine Livermore.

He made a single appearance in first-class cricket for the Gentlemen of England against Oxford University at Eastbourne in June 1910. Batting once in the match, he scored 5 not out in the Gentlemen of England first-innings, while with the ball he took a single wicket in the Oxford first-innings when he dismissed Charles Hooman, finishing with figures of 1 for 51 from eleven overs.

He served in the First World War with the Royal Fusiliers as part of The Stockbrokers' Battalion, enlisting in August 1914 as a lance corporal.

He landed in Boulogne in on 30 July 1915, with his battalion sent to Tilques. He was killed in action nearby on 8 October 1915. His body was never recovered and he is commemorated at the Thiepval Memorial. His brother, Gilly, was also a first-class cricketer.
