= Francis Carew (MP for Castle Rising) =

English politician (c. 1530–1611)

Francis Carew (1530?–1611), of Beddington, Surrey was an English politician.

== Family ==
Carew was the son of Nicholas Carew, friend of King Henry VIII, and his wife, Elizabeth Bryan, who has been suggested as a possible mistress of Henry VIII's. Through his mother, he was a third cousin of both Edward VI and Elizabeth I, through their mothers.

His father was executed for his supposed part in the Exeter Conspiracy in March 1539 and his lands were forfeited to the Crown. However his mother was a sister of Sir Francis Bryan, an intimate friend of the King, and through his goodwill, the family were able to live in reasonable comfort. By 1561 Carew had succeeded in recovering most of his father's forfeited estates, though he was forced to buy back Beddington from Thomas Darcy, 1st Baron Darcy of Chiche.

Little is known of Carew's early life, but he is thought to have been attached to the household of Queen Catherine Parr.

He rebuilt Beddington Hall, where he frequently entertained Elizabeth I and later James I. He built an orangery there, and a garden where he cultivated exotic plants.

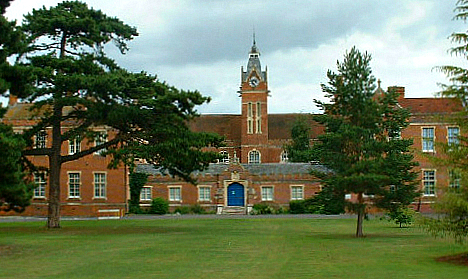
Beddington Hall

He never married and on his death, most of his estates passed to his nephew Nicholas Throckmorton, son of his sister Anne, who married the leading diplomat Sir Nicholas Throckmorton, on condition that he take the name Carew. He also left property to another nephew, Sir Francis Darcy, younger son of his sister Mary and Sir Arthur Darcy "for the comfort I have had in his company and conversation".

== Career ==
In general, he took little interest in politics, and avoided taking any public office; he prided himself on not asking for favours from the Crown, either for himself or others.

He was a Member (MP) of the Parliament of England for Castle Rising in 1563. He took no part in the Commons debates, and did not stand for election again.
