= Wedding March (Mendelssohn) =

Composition by Felix Mendelssohn

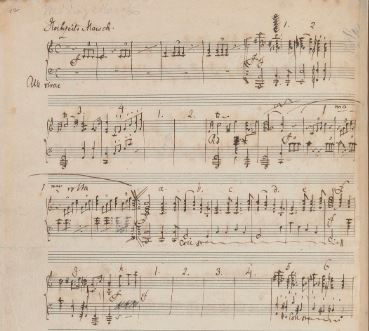
Mendelssohn's autograph arrangement of the Wedding March for piano (British Library collection)

Wedding March

Felix Mendelssohn's "Wedding March" in C major, written in 1842, is one of the best known of the pieces from his suite of incidental music (Op. 61) to Shakespeare's play A Midsummer Night's Dream. It is one of the most frequently used wedding marches, generally being played on a church pipe organ.

At weddings in many Western countries, this piece is commonly used as a recessional, though frequently stripped of its episodes in this context. It is frequently paired with the "Bridal Chorus" from Richard Wagner's opera Lohengrin, or with Jeremiah Clarke's "Prince of Denmark's March", both of which are often played for the entry of the bride.

The first known instance of Mendelssohn's "Wedding March" being used at a wedding was when Dorothy Carew wed Tom Daniel at St Peter's Church, Tiverton, England, on 2 June 1847 when it was performed by organist Samuel Reay. It became popular at weddings when it was selected by Victoria, The Princess Royal for her marriage to Prince Frederick William of Prussia on 25 January 1858. The bride was the eldest daughter of Queen Victoria, who loved Mendelssohn's music and for whom Mendelssohn often played while on his visits to Britain.

An organ on which Mendelssohn gave recitals of the "Wedding March", among other works, is housed in St Ann's Church, Tottenham.

Franz Liszt wrote a virtuoso transcription of the "Wedding March and Dance of the Elves" (S. 410) in 1849–50. Based on Liszt's transcription, Vladimir Horowitz then transcribed the "Wedding March" into a virtuoso showpiece for piano and played it as an encore at his concerts.

The march was formerly the regimental march of the Life-Guard Cossack Regiment, an elite unit in the Russian Imperial Guard. It is claimed that the march was awarded to the regiment by Alexander II, after remarking on the units "wedding-like" demeanor.
