= Roundshaw =

Housing estate and park in London

Coordinates: 51.354198°N 0.129543°W

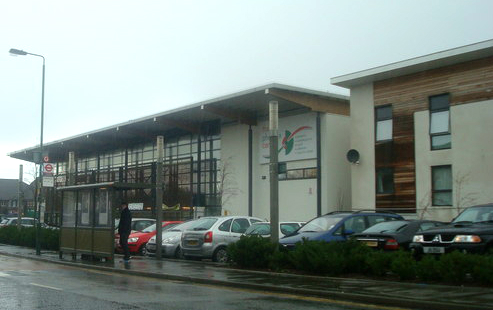
- The Phoenix Centre, Roundshaw

- Location within Greater London
- OS grid reference: TQ302633
- London borough: Sutton
- Ceremonial county: Greater London
- Region: London
- Country: England
- Sovereign state: United Kingdom
- Post town: WALLINGTON
- Postcode district: SM6
- Post town: PURLEY
- Postcode district: CR8
- Dialling code: 020
- Police: Metropolitan
- Fire: London
- Ambulance: London
- UK Parliament: Carshalton & Wallington; Croydon South
- London Assembly: Croydon and Sutton

Roundshaw is a housing estate and park in south Wallington and Beddington on the eastern edge of the London Borough of Sutton.

== History ==
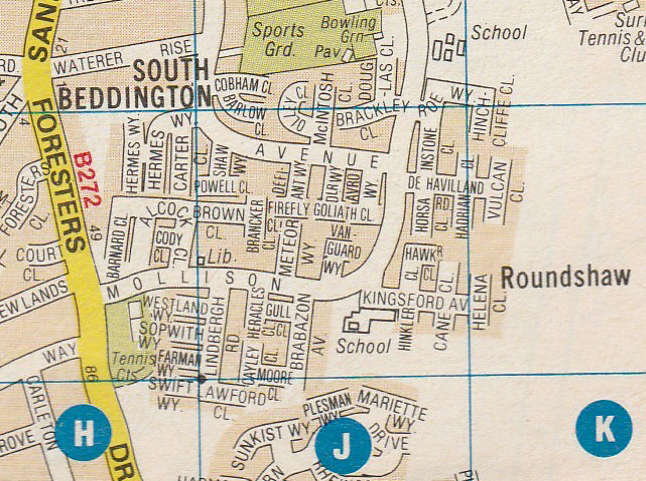
Roundshaw Estate as it appeared in the London A-Z atlas, published in 1990

Roundshaw was built on the site of the former Croydon Airport which once occupied the buildings of the first Croydon Aerodrome (originally named 'Plough Lane') which was demolished in 1928. The estate is commemorated in various ways; the naming of roads after aircraft, personalities, and firms linked with aviation to recall the airport's history: Mollison Drive, Lindbergh Road, Olley Close, Avro Way, Brabazon Avenue among other related aviation names. The name of the estate comes from Roundshaw Park on the edge of the site, named from a round 'shaw' or grove of trees.

The estate accommodates 1,800 homes. Originally designed by architects Chamberlin, Powell and Bon, construction began in 1965 with the first tenants moving in August 1967.

The original brutalist pre-cast concrete flats and maisonettes were heated from a central communal boiler house. This was demolished during the regeneration of the estate and the newly refurbished homes incorporate their own energy-efficient modern heating systems.

The London Borough of Sutton were the sole proprietors of the Roundshaw housing stock until 2007, when the responsibility was outsourced to Metropolitan and Hyde Housing Group who jointly created Roundshaw Homes. In 2015 the estate was transferred solely to Metropolitan.

== Regeneration ==
During the mid-1980s and throughout the 1990s, major repairs and renovations of the concrete system dwellings were carried out by contracted specialists commissioned by the London Borough of Sutton, as the 1960s construction and build deteriorated which resulted in the cause of concrete cancer. The layout of the estate included underground garages and balcony passageways in which anti-social behaviour was commonplace.

It became apparent over time and combining the large spiraling costs generated by the ongoing housing repairs, the London Borough of Sutton began to formulate plans for a regeneration programme over a ten-year period. After consultations with the Roundshaw Residents Group, building contractors and social housing groups, the layout of the estate and problems were addressed. This led to refurbishment trials which began at Barnard Close and Shaw Way, both the only original 1960's concrete system blocks to be refurbished. This was carried out as a pilot scheme in the late 1980s and mid 1990s but this was not repeated throughout the rest of the estate, as it was not cost effective.

Barnard Close is the only refurbished concrete system block still existing today. Shaw Way was subsequently demolished later at the final phase of the regeneration.

In 1998, the decision was taken to start the process of a partial demolition regeneration programme over a ten-year period, resulting at a cost of £80m. 1,000 mid to high-rise, street level concrete system flats and maisonnettes were demolished.

Phase one began at Roe Way, which was at street level, the system block maisonettes were demolished manually. Instone Close, a high-rise block, was imploded by Gregory Demolition in November 2000, involving local dignatories. This followed a gradual phase by phase roll-out of demolition with the rest of the estate being replaced with a number of new build low-rise houses and brick-built flats.

A further 674 brick built homes which were also part of the original estate and not of the concrete system, were retained and refurbished with pitched roofs. The regeneration programme was completed in 2010.

== Governance ==
Roundshaw is part of the Carshalton and Wallington constituency for elections to the House of Commons of the United Kingdom.

Roundshaw is part of the South Beddington and Roundshaw ward for elections to Sutton London Borough Council.

== Local amenities ==
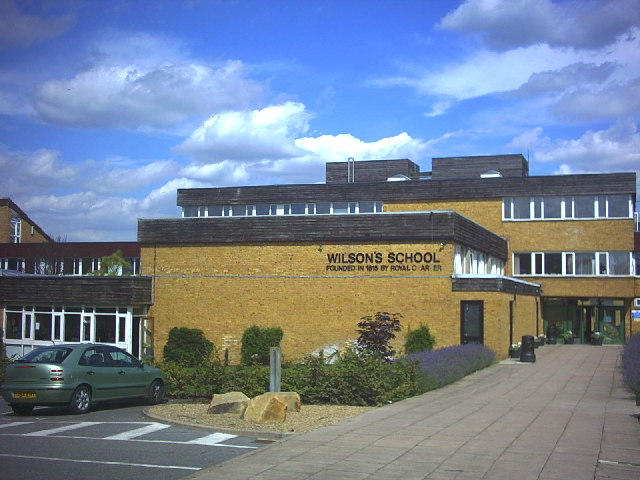
Wilson's School, Mollison Drive, Roundshaw

St Paul's Church was constructed and opened in 1981, which is used by the Church of England and the Free Churches. St Paul's was rebuilt and extended during the regeneration. Originally, it collaborated in a churchless religious venture known as the 'Roundshaw Experiment'. A cross was set up outside the church which is made from a four-bladed propeller, or airscrew, obtained through the Croydon Airport Society.

The primary school was named after the famous aviator, Amy Johnson, the first woman to fly solo to Australia, from Croydon Airport in May 1930.

Wilson's School was moved from Camberwell to Roundshaw in 1975.

Roundshaw Fields hosts the Croydon Pirates baseball team, one of the most successful teams in the British Baseball Federation. The fields have two of the best baseball diamonds in the UK, which Croydon often uses to host the London Tournament and National Finals.

There are a number of shops and takeaways in Mollison Square. The Phoenix Centre is the hub of the local community; in addition to the sporting and recreation activities, the centre has a library and IT Centre, Local Access Point, Youth Centre, Sensory Room and the Beehive Cafe. Charities such as Mencap run sporting sessions and community groups have access to the facilities.

The Phoenix Centre provides the following resources and activities:

- Freedom Fitness Centre
- Group Exercise Studio
- Full Sized Sports Hall
- Women's Morning
- Saturday Morning Family Fun Sessions
- Sutton Evergreens 50+ Sport Activities and Exercise Classes

=== Buses ===
Roundshaw is served by the following bus routes:

- 154
- 157
- S4
- (Formerly) 455

== Popular culture ==
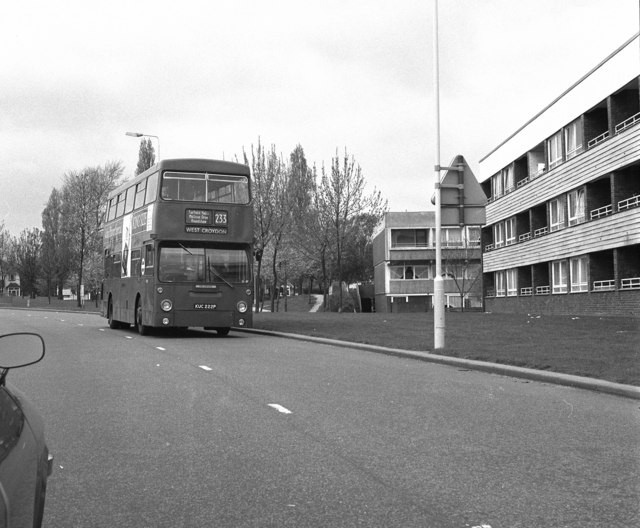
Mollison Drive, Roundshaw, April 1981

- Paralympic athlete David Weir lives in the area. The postbox in Mollison Square was painted gold in honour of the multiple medal winning performances at the 2012 Paralympics.
- Roundshaw was used as a filming location for the ITV drama The Bill, made by Thames Television.
- The main estate road, Mollison Drive, is named after the Scottish aviator Jim Mollison.
- The London Programme, made by London Weekend Television, filmed a feature on the estate in 1976.
- Roundshaw has a strong association with the development of the Acid House musical movement in the late 1980s.

== See also ==
- List of Parks and Open Spaces in Croydon
