= Wallington Town Hall =

Municipal building in London, England

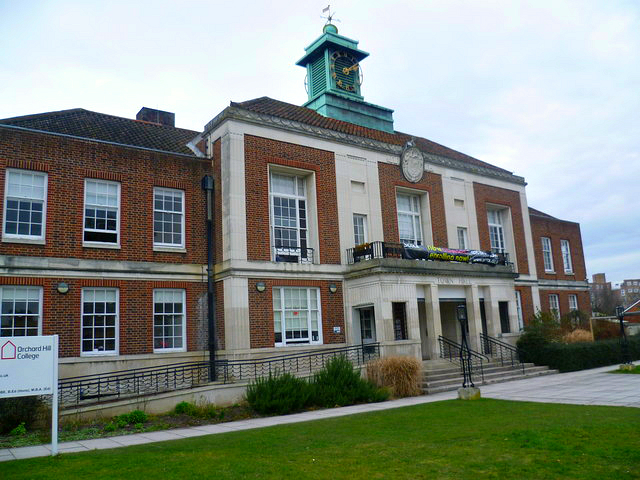
- Wallington Town Hall

- Shown in Sutton
- 51.3578°N 0.1500°W
- Location: Woodcote Road, Wallington

History
- Built: 1934

Site notes
- Architect: Robert Atkinson
- Architectural style: Georgian style

Listed Building – Grade II
- Designated: 24 April 2008
- Reference no.: 1392569

Wallington Town Hall is a municipal building in Woodcote Road, Wallington, London. It is a Grade II listed building.

== History ==
In the early 20th century Beddington and Wallington Urban District Council was based at 37 Manor Road, the former offices of Wallington Parish Council. After rapid population growth in the area, civic leaders decided to procure a purpose-built town hall: the site chosen for the new building was "Sunny Bank", a house on Woodcote Road, Wallington, which was bought in 1929.

The foundation stone for the new building was laid by Mr W. J. Mallinson DL on 12 May 1934. It was designed by Robert Atkinson in the Georgian style, built by Perry (Ealing) Ltd and was officially opened by the Member of Parliament for Mitcham, Sir Richard Meller, on 21 September 1934. The design involved a symmetrical main frontage with eleven bays facing onto Woodcote Road; the central section of five bays featured a three-bay porch with fluted pilasters; there was a central window and balcony with wrought-iron railings on the first floor with the borough coat of arms carved by the sculptor, Eric Aumonier, above; there was a copper-clad clock tower with a weather vane at roof level. The clock was designed and manufactured by Gillett & Johnston of Croydon. The landscaping around the building incorporated a garden of remembrance and a flagpole, which was erected in a prominent position in front of the building. The principal room was a double-height council chamber; the interior made extensive use of walnut paneling and the double-flight staircase, which was made from black and white marble, was decorated in an art deco style. Pevsner noted that the "romanticism of Sweden and Holland in the 1920s is represented, surprisingly prettily and pleasantly, by Wallington Town Hall".

The building went on to become the headquarters of the Municipal Borough of Beddington and Wallington when the area became a municipal borough in 1936. It ceased to be the local seat of government when the enlarged London Borough of Sutton was formed in 1965. After being used as the local registrar's office in the late 1960s and the 1970s, it was converted into a courthouse by dividing the council chamber into two courtrooms, one above the other, in 1980. After the courts moved out in April 1999, the building was then converted for educational use and became part of Sutton College in October 2005.
