= St Peter's Church, Tiverton =

Church in Devon, England

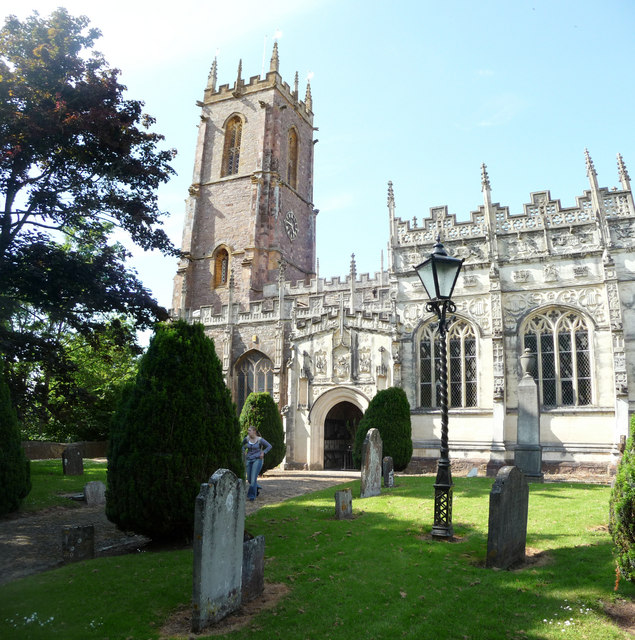
- St Peter's Church, Tiverton
- St Peter's Church, Tiverton
- 50°54′20″N 3°29′20″W
- OS grid reference: SS 95417 12840
- Location: St Peter Street, Tiverton, Devon EX16 6NR
- Country: England
- Denomination: Church of England

Administration
- Diocese: Diocese of Exeter
- Archdeaconry: Exeter
- Deanery: Tiverton

St Peter's Church, Tiverton is a Grade I listed parish church in the Church of England in Tiverton, Devon.

== History ==
The church dates from 1073. Several restorations have been undertaken, in 1825–1829 by G.A. Boyce, and in 1853–1856 by Edward Ashworth of Exeter.

The church was described by Nikolaus Pevsner as "a gorgeously ostentatious display of civic pride". The building was designated as Grade I listed in 1952.

== Organ ==
The earliest records of organs in the church are in 1524, but the current organ dates from 1696 by Christian Smith. There have been subsequent modifications by Andrews and Shirland (1711), John Snetzler (1770), Henry Willis (1867) and Noel Mander (1967). A specification of the organ can be found on the National Pipe Organ Register.

The church is noted as being the location of the first performance of Mendelssohn's "Wedding March" which was performed by Samuel Reay at the wedding of Dorothy Carew and Tom Daniel on 2 June 1847.
