= Wallington, London =

Town in Sutton, London, England

Coordinates: 51.3584°N 0.1483°W

Wallington
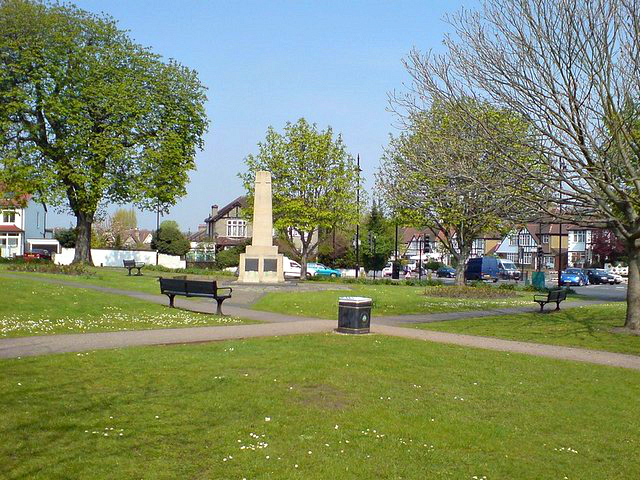
- Wallington Green

- Location within Greater London
- Population: 20,850 (2011 Census 2 Wards)
- OS grid reference: TQ294645
- London borough: Sutton
- Ceremonial county: Greater London
- Region: London
- Country: England
- Sovereign state: United Kingdom
- Post town: WALLINGTON
- Postcode district: SM6
- Dialling code: 020
- Police: Metropolitan
- Fire: London
- Ambulance: London
- UK Parliament: Carshalton and Wallington
- London Assembly: Croydon and Sutton

Wallington is a town in the London Borough of Sutton, South London, England, 9.9 miles (16 km) south south-west of Charing Cross. Before the Municipal Borough of Beddington and Wallington merged into the London Borough of Sutton in Greater London in 1965, it was part of the county of Surrey. Wallington is a post town in the SM postcode area. By the 13th century, Wallington was partially known as Hakebrug for a bridge on the River Wandle.

== History ==
The name "Wallington" derives from the Anglo Saxon "Waletone", meaning "village of the Britons". Wallington appears in Domesday Book of 1086 and was held by William the Conqueror. Its domesday assets were: 11 hides. It had 2 mills worth £1 10s 0d, 11 ploughs, 8 acres (32,000 m^{2}) of meadow. It rendered £10. The historic village was situated somewhat to the north of the current town centre around what is now Wallington Bridge over the River Wandle.

At the time of the Domesday book there were two mill ponds. The mill buildings have long been demolished, but the mill pond survives as The Grange boating lake. In the 1860s one Alfred Smee, surgeon to the Bank of England, constructed an elaborate garden on the north side of the Mill Pond, and wrote an illustrated book called "My Garden" in 1872.

What was then called "Carshalton" railway station was opened in 1847 in the open fields to the south of Wallington because the owner of Carshalton Park objected to it being built near to Carshalton village. This acted as a spur to the development of the area and in the 1860s Nathaniel Bridges created a prestigious housing estate of gothic revival villas (architect E. L. Brock). To provide a church for the estate, Bridges sponsored the construction of Holy Trinity, and Wallington became a separate parish in 1867. The area around Holy Trinity Church is known as Wallington Old Town. In particular Clifton Road, Belmont Road and Park Road exhibit some imposing Victorian and Edwardian villas. This southward development continued towards Woodcote and by the time of the First World War the section of Woodcote Road to the south of the station had become the new High Street.

Wallington High School for Girls was established in 1888 by a collective of nuns.

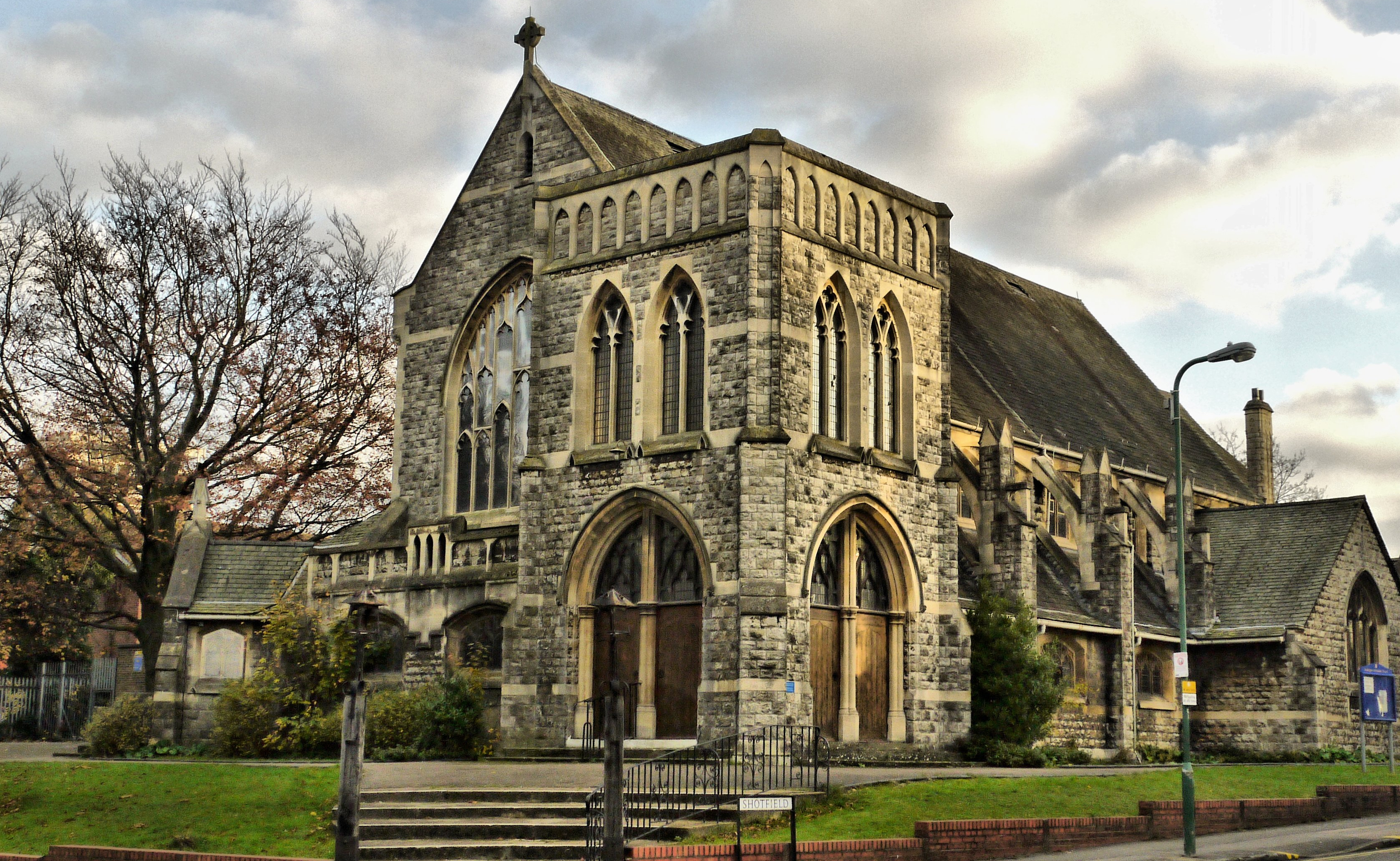
Wallington Methodist Church

Wallington Methodist Church was built in 1908 on a site in Beddington Gardens in the town centre.

Since 1902 the town has maintained the tradition of an annual crowning of the Wallington May Queen. The event begins with a procession through the town. Girls join the group at the age of three as "fairies", before graduating to "attendants to the May Queen" a year later. They then go on to become crown bearers before taking on the role of banner bearer. The girls then act as "princes", and become eligible to be a May Queen at the age of nine.

The Municipal Borough of Beddington and Wallington was incorporated in 1936 from the former Beddington and Wallington Urban District. Wallington Town Hall (architect Robert Atkinson) and public library were built in Wallington town centre in the 1930s, as was the fire station in Belmont Road.

Wallington County Grammar School (for boys) was opened on London Road, close to Beddington Park in 1927.

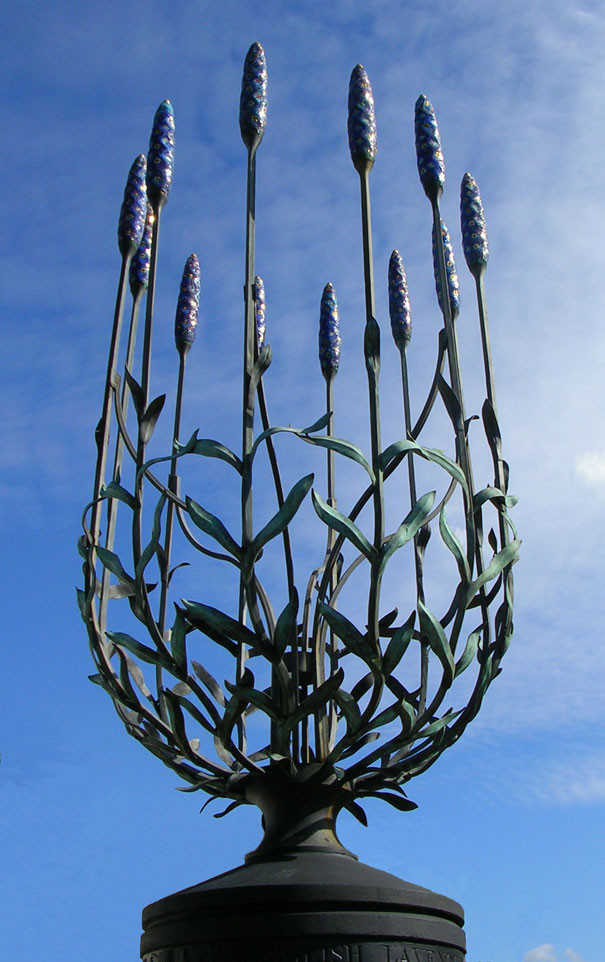
Guy Portelli's 1999 sculpture "English Lavender" in Wallington town centre.

Wallington was an important centre for the production of lavender oil until about the time of the First World War. Lavender and herb growing were very prominent in the area in Victorian times and much earlier, and extensive fields of lavender were to be seen in the Carshalton, Beddington and Wallington areas. Lavender growing was a very prosperous part of the local agriculture hereabouts in the 19th and early 20th centuries. In Wallington the area to the north of the station was chiefly used. The scale of the operation can be understood from the fact that the Daily News in 1914 was able to state that at nearby Carshalton Beeches "In every direction the low hill sides of the farm beyond Beeches Halt are swept with the bloomy pastel tint of the lavender flowers". The importance of lavender is remembered and commemorated in a number of ways, for example:

- There is a large sculpture at the junction of Woodcote Road and Stafford Road representing a lavender plant. Created by sculptor, Guy Portelli, it was installed in 1999 when the new Sainsbury's store was built.
- The Christmas lights also represent lavender plants.
- One of the local lavender farmers – John Jakson of Little Woodcote Farm – lent his name to a public house in Woodcote Road.
- Local Scouts use lavender as the logo for the Sutton area on their shoulder badge.

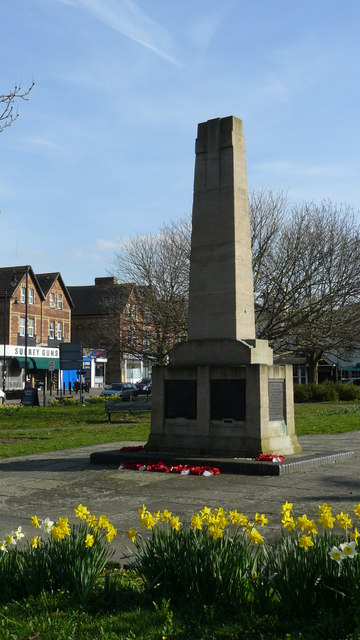
Wallington and Beddington War Memorial

Many of Wallington's young men served and lost their lives in the First World War, and in 1922 a memorial was unveiled on Wallington Green by General Edmund Elles to commemorate the fallen. The memorial was altered in 1949 to include the names of the locals who died in the Second World War.

The memorial is in the form of a Portland stone obelisk on a plinth, with a cross and a sunburst motif. On the sides are bronze plaques bearing the names of the fallen. It stands on blue Staffordshire engineering bricks and York stone. In 2005 it was discovered that the memorial was being attacked by moss, and English Heritage paid for its restoration.

The inscription reads:

1914 – 1918

To the glorious memory

of the men of Beddington and Wallington

who fell in the Great War.

They died that we might live.

== Amenities ==
Sutton Community Farm, the only one of its kind in Greater London, is located in Wallington. A not-for-profit social enterprise, it occupies a 7.5 acre small-holding of a type originally given to ex-servicemen following the First World War.

The town saw the opening of a small independent cinema in May 2014 at the Brook Cafe and Bar, along with a recording studio.

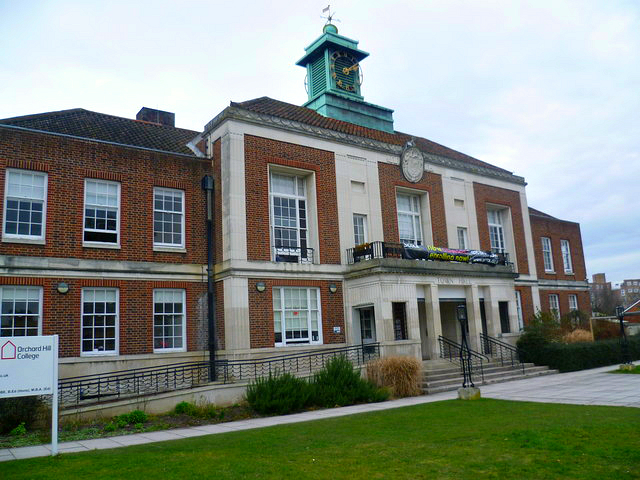
Orchard Hill College, Wallington. Previously Wallington Town Hall

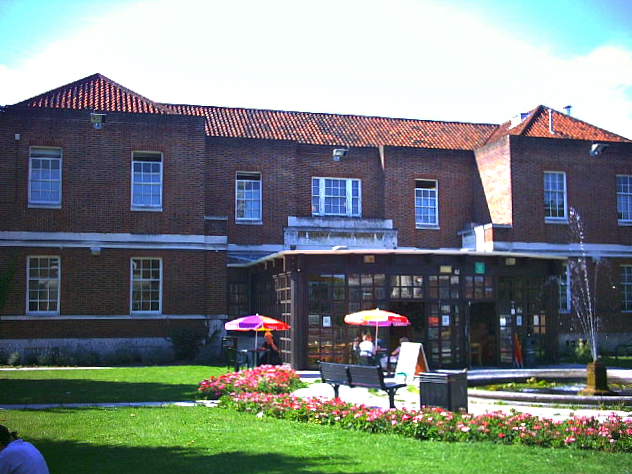
Wallington Library

== Holy Trinity Church ==
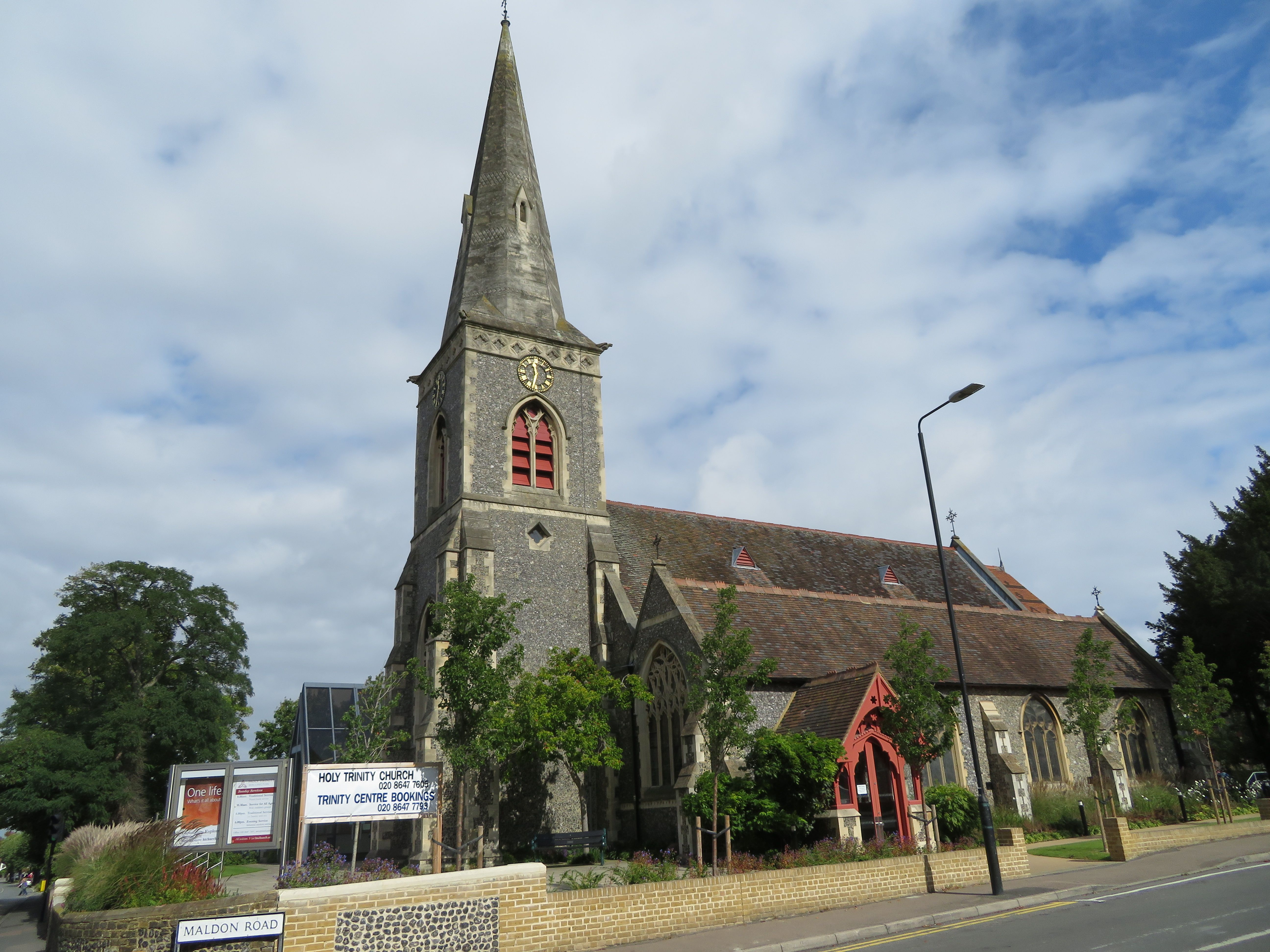
Holy Trinity Church, Wallington

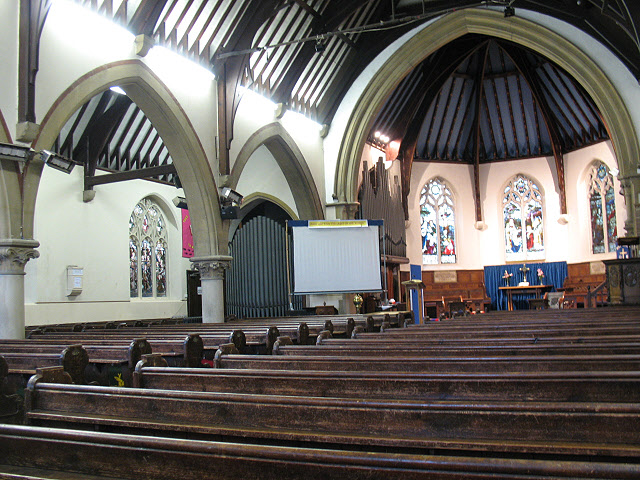
Interior of Holy Trinity Church

Wallington's parish church is located on Manor Road, and dedicated to the Holy Trinity. It was designed by Habershon and Brock, and completed in 1870. It has been Grade II listed since 1974.

The ancient Chapel of Wallington stood on a site to the north of the London Road, behind the brewery in the grounds of the Elm Grove Estate, and was demolished about the year 1791. A deed dated 1480 gives the information that the dedication of the chapel was to Our Lady of the Moor. The foundations were discovered in 1921, and with them some carved stones which were parts of windows and arches. The remains of the vanished Chapel may be seen in the walls of the Church Hall in Elm Grove and the more recent Church of St. Patrick.

The present Church of Holy Trinity was erected in 1866 by Mr Nathaniel Bridges, Lord of the Manor. The Church was consecrated on 28 September 1867, by Bishop Sumner of Winchester. Like the rest of the historic county of Surrey, the parish of Wallington at that time was in the Diocese of Winchester. It was later transferred to Rochester, and when the current Anglican Diocese of Southwark was formed, it was transferred to it.

The church was built to resemble the description of the old chapel – after the style of the 14th century. The west window of the south aisle is similar to one in the Church of Little St. Mary's Cambridge, which was erected about 1850. Each window has tracery of a different pattern. The stone used with the flints is Bath stone. The roof and floor are covered with Broseley tiles. The height of the spire is 110 feet. The interior of the church gives an area of 105 feet long by 75 feet broad, and gives sitting accommodation for 650 persons.

Since the Parish Church was built it has been adorned with several stained glass windows. Those on the south side are memorials to former worshippers. The central window in the chancel is a memorial to the Rev. John Williams, the first vicar. The north window was presented by the relatives as a memorial to those who fell in World War I, while that in the south side is a gift of the parishioners as a War Memorial.

In 1926 the chancel was entirely refurbished, with new Communion Hails – the gift of Mrs Bund, in memory of her husband; a new pulpit – the gift of Mr W. J. Mallinson; a brass eagle lectern – the gift of Mrs Cleverly; marble and alabaster baptismal font – the gift of Mrs Page; oak panelling in the chancel and sanctuary and new oak doors and vestibule at the south entrance – the gifts of members of the Landon family and Miss Roche; and new choir stalls (the cost of which was defrayed by subscriptions) were added to the Church.

== Open space ==
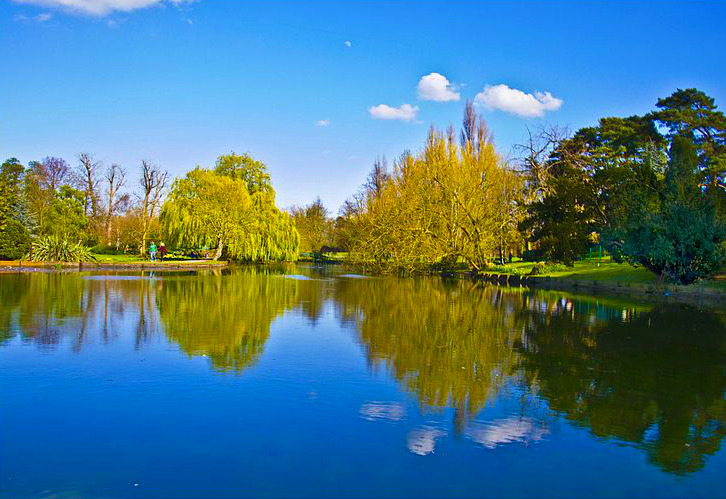
Boating lake, Beddington Park

Parks in the Wallington area include Mellows Park, Beddington Park, Woodcote Green, and the Grange Gardens.

The latter two, through which the River Wandle flows, lie in the north-east of the area, on the border with neighbouring Beddington. Beddington Park is nearly 100 acres in size and is maintained by the London Borough of Sutton. It was originally part of the Deer Park attached to Carew Manor, a grand country house built in the Tudor period, which stands to this day. It comprises a large area of open grassland with small clumps of trees, with an area of more formal gardens near the Grange restaurant, as well as a lake and pond. The main lake in the south west of the park was originally a mill pond. There are many paths and a number of ornamental bridges, which cross the stream which feeds the lake: this is part of the River Wandle, and the park is on the Wandle Trail. Part of the park is managed as a wildlife site.

== Governance ==
Wallington is part of the Carshalton and Wallington constituency for elections to the House of Commons.

Wallington is part of the Wallington North and Wallington South wards for elections to Sutton London Borough Council.

On 1 April 1965 the civil parish was abolished. At the 1951 census (one of the last before the abolition of the parish), Wallington had a population of 13,419.

== Transport ==
Wallington is served by rail, bus and coach connections.

=== Rail ===
Services operate from Wallington to Victoria and London Bridge via West Croydon and to Epsom Downs and Epsom via Sutton and beyond.

=== Bus ===
Bus services are available from Wallington:

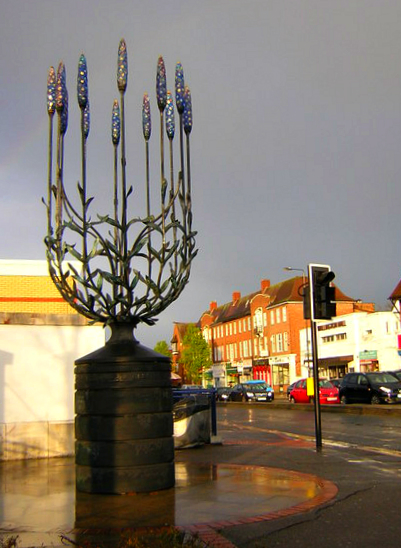
Guy Portelli's 1999 sculpture celebrating local lavender

- 127 – to Purley, Carshalton, Mitcham, Tooting Broadway
- 151 – to Carshalton, St Helier, Sutton, Cheam, Worcester Park
- 154 – to Croydon, Carshalton, Sutton, Morden
- 157 – to Crystal Palace, Croydon, Morden
- 407 – to Caterham, Purley, Croydon, Sutton
- 410 – to Crystal Palace, Norwood, Croydon, Beddington
- 463 – to Coulsdon, Beddington, Mitcham
- 612 – to Wallington County Grammar School
- 627 – to Wallington High School for Girls
- S3 – to Malden Manor, Belmont, Carshalton Beeches, Wallington North, Sutton Hospital
- S4 – to Waddon Marsh, Sutton
- SL7 – to Croydon, Carshalton, Sutton, Kingston, Heathrow

=== Coach ===
National Express services no longer travel through Wallington.

=== Bicycle ===
National Cycle Route 20 travels in a north–south direction on the edge of Wallington connecting cyclists with Wandsworth on the River Thames and Brighton on the South Coast

== Notable people ==
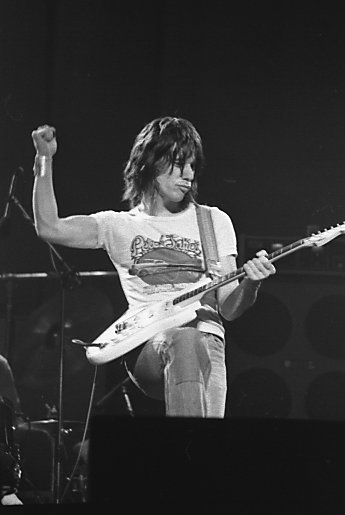
Jeff Beck in 1973

- Neil Ardley (1937–2004), jazz pianist and composer, was born in Wallington
- Jeff Beck (1944–2023), rock guitarist, was born in Wallington and lived on Demesne Road
- Helen Clare (1916–2018), singer, lived in Cranley Gardens
- Gary Mason, British Heavyweight Champion boxer, lived in Wallington before his death on Sandy Lane South whilst riding his bicycle, in 2011
- Linsey Dawn McKenzie, glamour model and pornographic actress
- Phyllis Mudford (1906–2006), Wimbledon ladies doubles winner 1931
- Mervyn Peake lived there for five years when he inherited his father's house in 1953, but sold the house for development when he moved to Chelsea
- Wilfrid Reay (1891–1915), cricketer
- Nick Ross, television presenter
- Eileen Shanahan (1901–1979), Irish poet, lived with her family in Blenheim Gardens
- John Debenham Taylor (1920–2016), Secret Intelligence Service officer, born in Wallington
- David Walliams (actor) had his primary education at Collingwood Boys' School in Wallington, London, (Surrey), (now Collingwood School)
- David Weir, Paralympic gold medalist lives on the Roundshaw estate
- Elsie Widdowson, dietitian and nutritionist, born in Wallington

== Sport and leisure ==
Wallington has a Non-League football club called Carshalton Athletic and many social clubs.The town has four gold post boxes commemorating local resident David Weir's four gold medals at the 2012 Summer Paralympics.

== Education ==
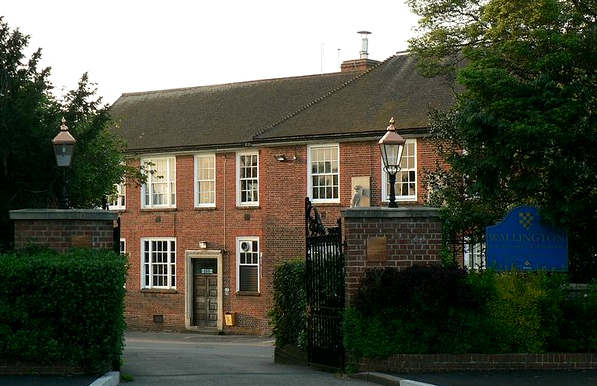
Wallington County Grammar School

Primary education

- Bandon Hill Primary School
- Beddington Infants School
- Collingwood School (Fee Paying)
- Foresters Primary School
- Highview Primary School
- Holy Trinity C of E Junior School
- St Elphege's School
- Wallington Primary Academy (Formerly Amy Johnson Primary School)

Secondary education

- Wallington County Grammar School
- Wallington High School for Girls
- Wilson's School

All three secondary schools are highly rated grammar schools, with one (Wilson's School) being one of the highest achieving state schools – including all state grammars – in Britain. See the London Borough of Sutton article for further details of education in the borough.
