= Gilly Reay =

English cricketer

Personal information
- Full name: Gilbert Martin Reay
- Born: 24 January 1887; Wallington, Surrey, England
- Died: 31 January 1967 (aged 80); Croydon, Surrey, England
- Batting: Right-handed
- Bowling: Right-arm fast-medium

Domestic team information
- Years: Team
- 1913 to 1923: Surrey

Career statistics
Competition	First-class
Matches	29
Runs scored	423
Batting average	13.21
100s/50s	0/1
Top score	54
Balls bowled	Unknown
Wickets	91
Bowling average	21.54
5 wickets in innings	3
10 wickets in match	0
Best bowling	5/22
Catches/stumpings	13/–
- Source: Cricinfo, 5 March 2021

Gilbert Martin ("Gilly") Reay (24 January 1887 – 31 January 1967) was an English first-class cricketer active 1913–23 who played for Surrey. He was born in Wallington, and died in Croydon. He played 29 matches as an amateur either side of World War I. His best season in first class cricket came in 1920, when he took 42 wickets at an average of 18.71. He appeared in the Gentlemen v Players match of 1923.
