= Samuel Reay =

Samuel Reay (17 March 1822 – 21 July 1905) was an organist and composer based in England.

== Life ==
He was born on 17 March 1822 (although some sources give 1826 or 1828), the son of George Agnew Reay, organist of Hexham Abbey, and Eleanor Spraggon.

His father moved to Ryton on Tyne and Samuel became a chorister in the choir at Durham Cathedral.

He is noted for having performed the first organ arrangement of Mendelssohn's "Wedding March" which he arranged whilst in Tiverton.

Whilst in Newark he was conductor of the Newark Philharmonic Society.

== Appointments ==
- Assistant Organist of St Hilda's Church, South Shields (1839 – ????)
- Organist of Houghton-le-Spring
- Organist of St Andrew's Church, Newcastle upon Tyne (1841–1845)
- Organist of St. Thomas the Martyr, Barras Bridge (1845–1847)
- Organist of St Peter's Church, Tiverton (1847–1854)
- Organist of St. John's Church, Hampstead (1854–1856)
- Organist of St. Saviour's Church, Warwick Road (1856 – ????)
- Organist of St Stephen's Church, Westbourne Park, Paddington (???? – 1859)
- Organist of St. Peter's College, Radley (1859–1861)
- Organist of the Church of St Mary the Virgin, Bury (1861–1864)
- Organist of the Church of St. Mary Magdalene, Newark-on-Trent (1864–1901) and Master of the Song School (1864–1905)

== Compositions ==
His compositions include:

- Morning and evening services in F, G, D, B♭ and A
- Anthems and part songs.
