= Carew Manor =

Former manor house in Beddington, London

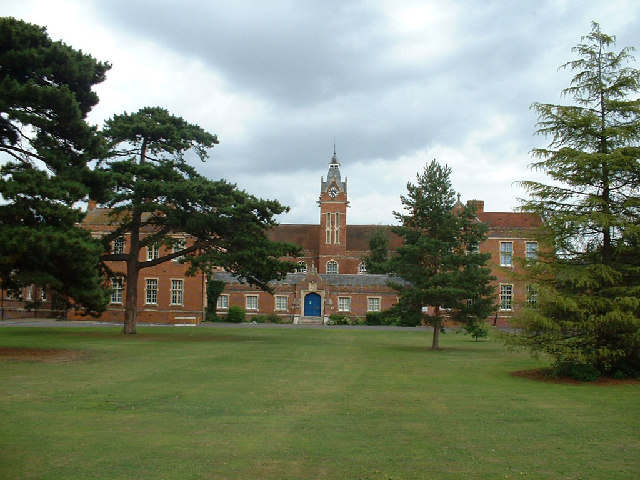

General information
- Type: Residential
- Location: London, England
- Coordinates: 51°22′19″N 0°08′21″W
- Completed: c. 1550

Listed Building – Grade I
- Official name: Beddington Place (Great Hall Only)
- Designated: 21 January 1954
- Reference no.: 1065672

Carew Manor – also known by Beddington Place, Beddington Park, Beddington House or Beddington Hall – is a former manor and manor house in Beddington in South London now occupied by Carew Manor School. The manor house's Great Hall is Grade I listed.

== History and description ==
Manors on the site were first mentioned in 675, with Domesday Book recording two separate Beddington manors. One of these manors came into the possession of Nicholas Carew in the 14th century; he acquired the second a few years later and both were consolidated into a single manor which remained in the possession of the Carew family.

Alterations or extensions were undertaken by Nicholas Carew (died 1539), Francis Carew (died 1611) and Nicholas Carew (died 1727). The house once included extensive gardens which were well known in the 17th century; they included waterworks and an orangery where exotic plants were grown. It is supposed that the first orange trees grown in England are said to have been on the manor, with seeds brought from the Americas by Sir Walter Raleigh who married the niece of Sir Francis Carew. A moat and drawbridge surrounding the house which do not survive were known to be repaired during the English Civil War. The surrounding Beddington Park was laid out in the late 19th century.

By the 1860s it had become an orphanage, and today is used by the Crew Manor Special School. The most prominent surviving feature is its Great Hall of the 15th century, with a arch-braced hammer-beam roof, similar to that of Eltham Palace. It was previously hidden by moulded decorations of the several refurbishments. There are also surviving cellars from the Tudor house.
