= George Agnew Reay =

British organist and organ builder (1798–1879)

George Agnew Reay (6 Nov 1798 – 1879) was an organist and organ builder based in Hexham, Alnwick and Morpeth.

== Life ==
He was born in York in 1798. Early in his life he was appointed organist of Hexham Abbey. He married Eleanor Spraggon on 24 Dec 1821 in Hexham. They had the following children

- George Reay
- Margaret Jane Reay (d. 1826, aged 2 years 7 month)
- Samuel Reay also became an organist.

Eleanor Spraggon died in December 1826. On 13 May 1828 he married his second wife Ann Thompson in St Andrew's Church, Newcastle upon Tyne. In 1836 he moved to Ryton-on-Tyne. By 1851 he was working in Alnwick. He was advertising as an organ builder by 1860 when he had for sale

a new organ of 13 stops, Great Organ, Manual CC to C in Altissimo, Swell Organ Tenor C to C alto. 2 Octaves of German Pedals, &c. Also and Organ with 4 stops, CC to F, 1 ½ Octave of German Pedals, also with Barrel to play 10 tunes.

He appears to have fallen on hard times as in 1864 there was a public concert and the proceeds were given to him as a mark of respect.

== Appointments ==
- Organist at Hexham Abbey 1820 - ca 1828 - ????
- Organist in Alnwick ca. 1857
- Organist at St Bartholomew's Church, Newbiggin-by-the-Sea ca. 1871
