= Beddington =

Suburb of London

Coordinates: 51.371°N 0.132°W

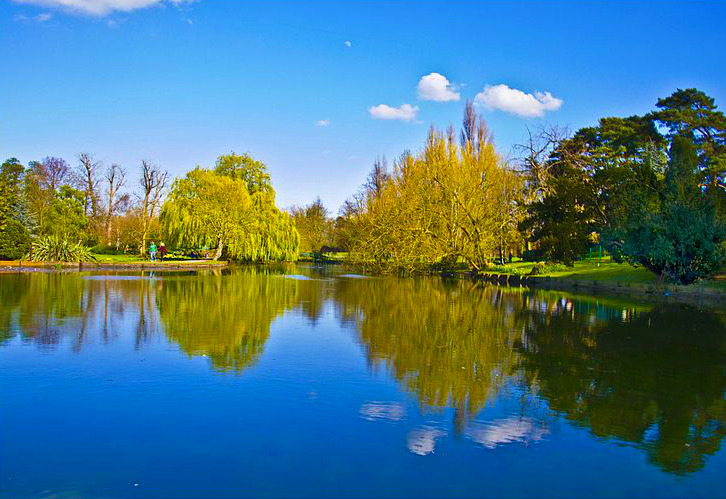
- Beddington Park in the London Borough of Sutton

- Location within Greater London
- Population: 21,004
- OS grid reference: TQ305655
- London borough: Sutton
- Ceremonial county: Greater London
- Region: London
- Country: England
- Sovereign state: United Kingdom
- Post town: WALLINGTON
- Postcode district: SM6
- Post town: CROYDON
- Postcode district: CR0
- Dialling code: 020
- Police: Metropolitan
- Fire: London
- Ambulance: London
- UK Parliament: Carshalton & Wallington
- London Assembly: Croydon and Sutton

Beddington is a low-rise residential and amenity-land locality occupying the north-east corner of the London Borough of Sutton. Towards its north is a green landscape Beddington Park – sometimes known as Carew Manor beyond which is a nature reserve and important sewage treatment works. The River Wandle weaves through that area from east to west where is also a light industry and distribution park bearing its name. In the south, much of the land today forms Roundshaw which is of a similar size to the northern residual land. Residents use conflicting modern place-name definitions but it is defined in UK city style by Sutton Council electoral wards, amenities, and more traditionally by parishes as they include or omit its name. Beddington has minor or even forgotten status within its once extensive southern and western parts – Beddington has neither a train station, nor a post town status in a part of the capital city which uses both (searches for all addresses in SM6 simply generate "WALLINGTON"). In post towns, it is within its Victorian daughter parish to the west, Wallington which was a much narrower manor, but did have status in the earlier basic system of Hundred courts.

The place was one of many spring line settlements. Its history of farming and human habitation pre-dates the Roman Britain era; it has no farms or commons today but retains protected green spaces and biodiversity. In some definitions it can be said to encompass Beddington Zero Energy Development (BedZED), an environmentally friendly housing development in Hackbridge in the same borough.

== History ==
The earliest settlement here dates from the Late Bronze to Iron Age, as some kind of farmstead, the official scheduled monument geographical protection. Scant remains of a Roman villa share the same area, underground, in the east of the (manor) park.

The village lay in Wallington hundred which had very minor administrative use; until the 19th century was in secular and ecclesiastical terms a large parish and the mother parish of Wallington, in the county of Surrey the main function of which was county assizes of judges until county councils were set up in 1889. Wallington was for centuries a manor in Beddington parish and although known as a shorthand for the area stretching from Cheam to Addington and from Chaldon to Mitcham (inclusive). Wallington superseded most of Beddington's extent from the early 20th century, as took both a train station, and most pivotally the post town status with quite strict borders in a part of the capital city which uses both as popular naming tools.

The settlement appears in the Domesday Book of 1086 as Beddinton(e) held partly by Robert de Watevile from Richard de Tonebrige (also called Richard fitz Gilbert) and by Miles Crispin (also called Milo of Wallingford). Its Domesday Assets were: 6 hides; 1 church, 14 ploughs, 4 mills worth £3 15s 0d, 44 acres (0.18 km^{2}) of meadow, woodland worth 10 hogs per year. It rendered: £19 10s 0d per year to its feudal system overlords. In 1901 it consisted of 3,127.5 acres (12.657 km^{2}), of which 1,439 acres were arable land, 614 permanent grass and 45 woods. As this was before the expansion of Wallington, it extends on the south over the chalk downs at Roundshaw and northwards on to the London Clay. Lavender and medicinal herbs were grown commercially in the parish. The population in 1901 was 4,812. The parish was bounded on the north by Mitcham Common, and the three parishes of Croydon, Beddington and Mitcham met on the railway line by Beddington Lane station.

The 1911 Victoria County History documents Beddington in the period of its shrinkage.

Wallington is now more urban than Beddington; the hamlet in 1901 had a population of 5,152 on an area of 312 acres. In prehistoric times it also appears to have been the more important place, since it gave its name to the hundred. It is possible that the Roman remains mentioned above may be a relic of a formerly important place, and that its name may preserve the memory of the Wealas, the Romanized Britons, whom the Suthrige found here when Britain was [mostly] becoming England. In historical records, however, Wallington is not a place of importance. There was a chapel, but there is no record of a parish church. In Bishop Willis's visitation of 1725 the chapel is described as partly used for a barn, no service having taken place [in memory]. It was ruinous later in the century and was pulled down in 1797. There were extensive common fields, as was usual in the parishes on the north side of the chalk range. They were inclosed under an Act of 1812. In 1835 a system of allotments was established, which seems to have flourished for a time. A few old houses remain at Wallington Corner, but none of these appear to date from earlier than the beginning of the 19th century.

Wallington church was founded in 1867 to serve the majority of local people, being Anglicans, in what had been Beddington's western approximate half. Holy Trinity Church school was built in 1896; Wallington High School for girls was built in 1895 and enlarged in 1905. Thus it came about that Wallington took up most of the land of Beddington. Wallington post town has existed since the early 20th century; the railway station was renamed from somewhat mis-placed "Carshalton" in 1868.

A static inverter plant of HVDC Kingsnorth stood here in the late 20th century.

== Governance ==
Beddington forms part of the Carshalton and Wallington constituency, which, since 2024, is represented in the House of Commons, the national level of politics, by Bobby Dean, a Liberal Democrat.

Beddington mostly overlaps the Beddington and South Beddington and Roundshaw wards for elections to Sutton London Borough Council.

On 1 April 1965 the civil parish was abolished. At the 1951 census (one of the last before the abolition of the parish), Beddington had a population of 19,338.

== Beddington Mill ==
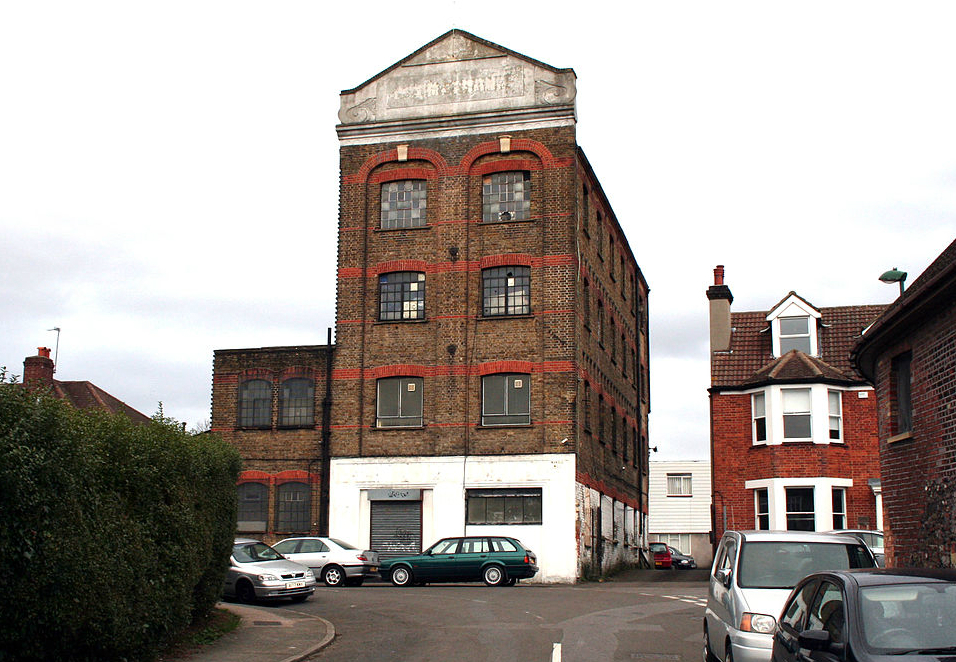
Beddington Mill in 2010

The Domesday Book mentions two mills at Beddington. The current one is thought to have been the site of one. Once erroneously thought to have been owned in the late 16th century by Sir Walter Raleigh, an early 17th-century lease shows that it was owned by the Carew family as a flour mill. In 1805 it was a snuff mill with a new owner, and it changed hands several times before being burnt down and replaced by the current building in 1891–1892 by Wallis & Co as a flour mill and bakery.

== Beddington Park ==
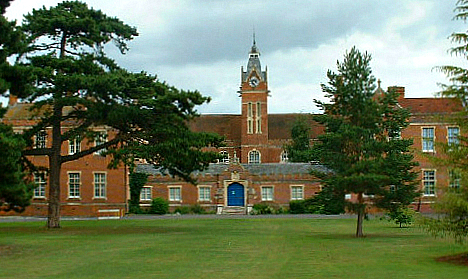
Carew Manor, the former manor house of the Carew family, now Carew Manor School, Beddington

=== Carew Manor ===
Beddington Park was the former manor house of the Carew family, lost to lenders (such as George Samuel Ford) by Charles Hallowell Hallowell Carew's bad debts in the 1850s. The Domesday Book mentions two Beddington estates and these were united by Nicholas Carew (Lord Privy Seal) to form Carew Manor in 1381. The manor house, once moated, was mostly rebuilt in the mid-nineteenth century to become the Royal Female Orphanage from 1866 until 1968. It is split between council offices and Carew Manor School.

In about 1591 Sir Walter Raleigh secretly, and without royal permission, married one of Queen Elizabeth I's maids of honour, Elizabeth Throckmorton of Carew Manor. Raleigh spent time in the Tower of London for this and Elizabeth was expelled from the court but the marriage appears to have been a genuine love-match and survived the imprisonment. During the visit of Christian IV of Denmark to England to greet new king James I in August 1606, the royal party visited Beddington, hosted by Sir George Carew. When Raleigh was beheaded by James in 1618, someone (oral tradition asserts his wife, expressly for the rest of her life) claimed his embalmed head and kept it in a bag. His body was buried in St Margaret's, Westminster, and after his wife's death 29 years later, his head was also interred there.

The Grade I listed great hall (or banqueting hall), containing a fine hammerbeam roof, survives from the medieval house. In the grounds are part of the orangery built in the early 18th century around orange trees planted by Sir Francis Carew (claimed to be the first planted in England) and an early 18th-century Grade II* listed dovecote.

Arms of Carew Or, 3 lions passant in pale sable

Archaeologists have discovered an ornate Tudor garden including a grotto, dating to the ownership of Sir Francis Carew in the 16th century. Its exact location has not been disclosed to protect it.

The family have given their name to a street, generally considered in Wallington, Carew Road.

=== Carew Arms ===
Arms of Carew: Or, 3 lions passant in pale sable were the arms shown on the seal of "Nicholas de Carreu" (c. 1255 – 1311), appended to the Barons' Letter, 1301, which he joined as "Lord of Mulesford" and which were blazoned for the same bearer in the Caerlaverock Poem or Roll of Arms of 1300, when he was present at the Siege of Caerlaverock Castle. From him are descended the Carew baronets of Antony and of Haccombe, the Earl of Totnes and Baron Carew.

=== St Mary's Church ===
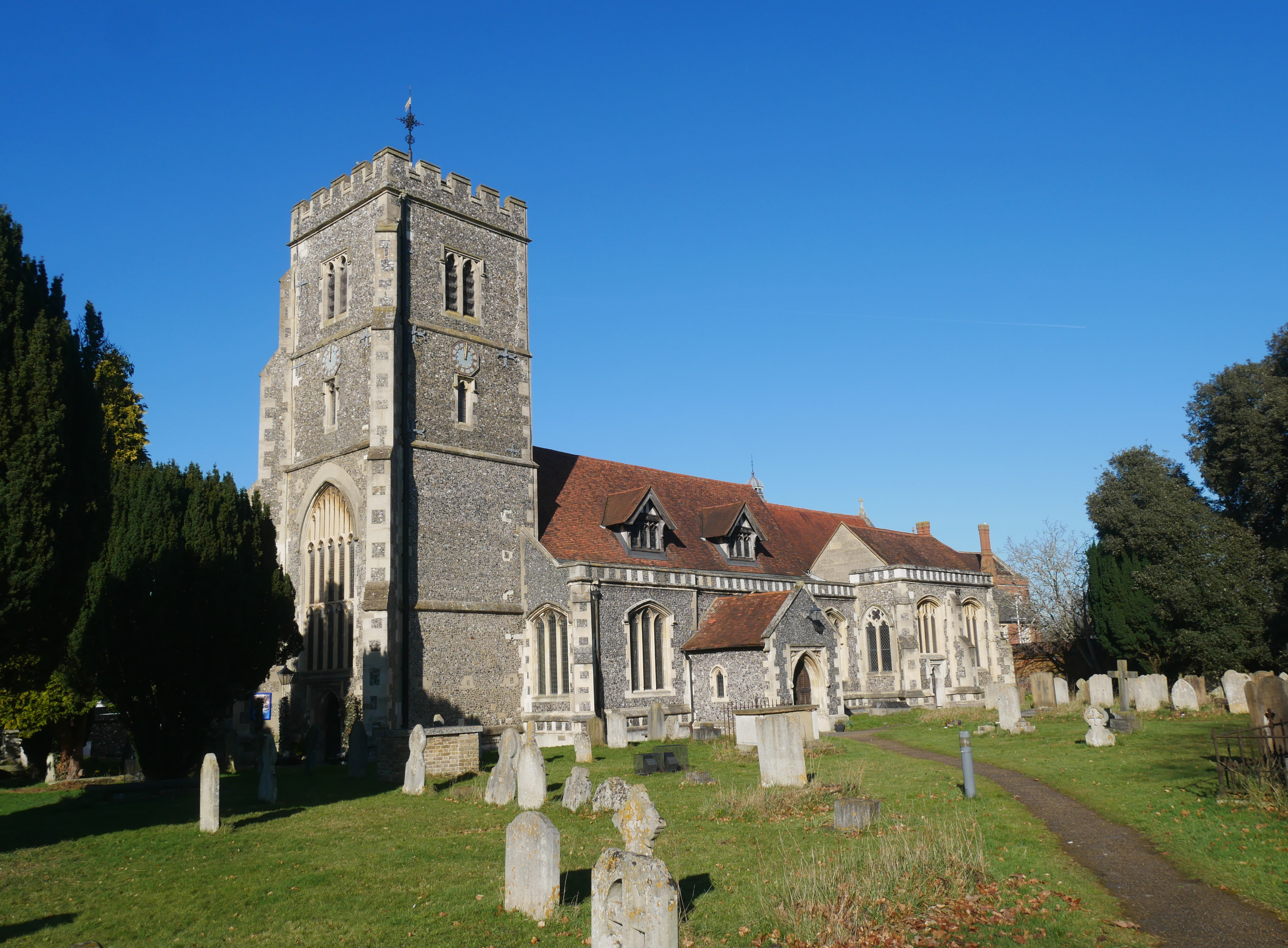
St Mary's Church

The Grade II* listed 14th-century flint parish church of St Mary's occupies a prominent position in Beddington Park, immediately south of what is now Carew Manor School. It contains an organ screen by William Morris. The church is designated at Grade II* for the following principal reasons:

- It has substantial amounts of fabric from the 14th and 15th centuries
- It was extensively restored and provided with an extremely elaborate and interesting mid-Victorian decorative scheme.
- It has monuments and other fixtures of importance from circa 1200 to the 20th century, including the font and Carew tombs.
- The Morris and Co. organ is of special note, and the Last Judgment reredos is unusual.

== Transport ==
The nearest railway station to most parts is Waddon, to the east. The north of Beddington's industry/logistic parks by Beddington Lane tram stop are served by the Wimbledon branch of London (Croydon) trams.

The area is served by bus routes, all of which are operated by Transport for London.

- 407 – Sutton to Caterham
- 410 – Wallington to Crystal Palace
- 463 – Pollards Hill to Coulsdon South
- S4 – Waddon Marsh to Sutton

== Namesakes ==
Beddington Heights, Calgary is named after it.

== Nearest places ==
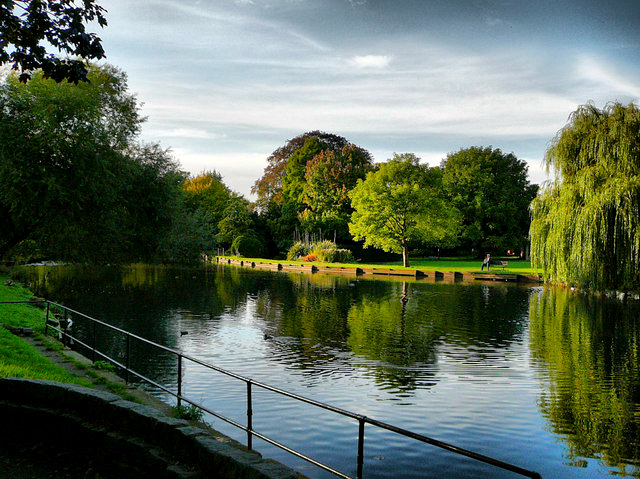
The boating lake in Beddington Park

- Carshalton
- Hackbridge
- Mitcham
- Roundshaw
- Waddon
- Wallington
