= John Paston (died 1479) =

Member of the Parliament of England

Sir John Paston
- Born: before 15 April 1442
- Died: November 1479 (aged 37); London, England
- Buried: Whitefriars, London
- Father: John Paston
- Mother: Margaret Mautby

Sir John Paston (before 15 April 1442 – November 1479) was the eldest son of John Paston and Margaret Mautby. He succeeded his father in 1466, and spent a considerable part of his life attempting to make good his father's claim to the lands of Margaret Mautby's kinsman, Sir John Fastolf. A number of his letters survive among the Paston Letters, a rich source of historical information for the lives of the English gentry of the period. Although long betrothed to Anne Haute, a first cousin of Elizabeth Woodville, he never married, and was succeeded by his younger brother, also named John.

== Family ==
John Paston, born before 15 April 1442, was the eldest son and heir of John Paston and Margaret Mautby, daughter and heir of John Mautby of Mautby, Norfolk. He had a younger brother, also named John (1444–1504), who later succeeded him, as well as three other brothers, Edmund, Walter and William, and two sisters, Margery and Anne.

== Career ==
Although nothing is known of John Paston's education, it is clear from his correspondence, and from the surviving inventory of his books in his own hand, that he had been well educated. He became a courtier in the household of Edward IV in 1461, and was knighted when he reached the age of majority in 1463. In November 1463 he angered his father by leaving home without his parents' consent, perhaps to join the King in the north of England, and in December 1464 a further quarrel with his father resulted in their complete estrangement, with his father terming him 'a drone among bees'; they were not reconciled until May 1465.

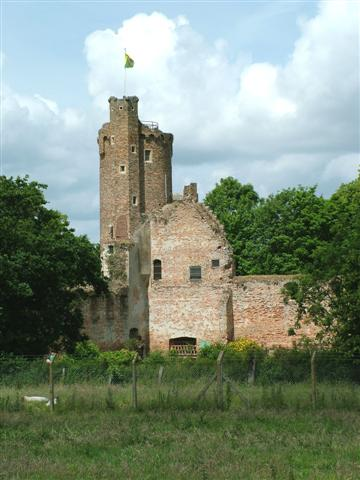
Ruins of Caister Castle, which John Paston claimed to have inherited from Sir John Fastolf

Much of his father's time from the mid-1450s had been taken up by his position as adviser to Sir John Fastolf. In June 1459 Fastolf had made a written will in which he appointed ten executors and charged them with founding a college in Caister. However, after Fastolf died on 5 November 1459, Paston's father claimed that on 3 November Fastolf had made a nuncupative will giving Paston exclusive authority over the foundation of the college, and providing that, after payment of 4000 marks, Paston was to have all Fastolf's lands in Norfolk and Suffolk. Relying on the nuncupative will, Paston took possession of the Fastolf estates, and resided at times at Fastolf's manors of Caister and Hellesdon. However his claim to the Fastolf lands was challenged by John Mowbray, 3rd Duke of Norfolk, by William Yelverton and Gilbert Debenham, by John de la Pole, 2nd Duke of Suffolk, and by Anthony Woodville, 2nd Earl Rivers, and in 1464 a legal challenge to Paston's executorship under the nuncupative will was mounted by William Yelverton; the lawsuit was still undecided at the time of his death.

The 'defining feature of Sir John Paston's career' was thus the 'struggle to make good his father's claim to inherit the estates of Sir John Fastolf'. According to Tait, however, he was temperamentally ill-suited to the task, and although in July 1466, only two months after his father's death, he was confirmed in his possession of Caister and other lands by Edward IV, he was seldom afterwards in Norfolk, although he was occasionally appointed to administrative offices there, serving as Member of Parliament in 1467 and as a Justice of the Peace in 1469. He preferred to reside in London, first in Fleet Street, and then at the George near Paul's Wharf, and left the task of defending the family's East Anglian possessions to his mother and younger brother, John. In April 1467 he participated in a tournament at Eltham Palace with Edward IV and his brother-in-law, Anthony Woodville, 2nd Earl Rivers, and it is owing to Paston that we have an account of a famous tournament in England between Paston's friend, Earl Rivers, and the Bastard of Burgundy. In the following year Paston and his brother John were among those who accompanied Edward IV's sister, Margaret of York, to Bruges for her marriage to Charles the Bold, Duke of Burgundy,

During this period Paston was occasionally appointed to administrative offices in Norfolk, serving as Member of Parliament in 1467 and as a Justice of the Peace in 1469.

In August 1467 Paston and Fastolf's former chaplain, Thomas Howes, were granted probate of Fastolf's will. Howes then defected to the trustees who had been appointed under Fastolf's written will, and who were continuing to oppose the Paston family's claims. In October 1468 several of these trustees, including Howes and William Yelverton, sold Caister to John Mowbray, 4th Duke of Norfolk, whose father, John Mowbray, 3rd Duke of Norfolk, had attempted to seize it in 1461. In August 1469 Norfolk laid siege to Caister Castle, and after five weeks Paston's younger brother, John, was forced to surrender it.

In 1470 the ongoing dispute over the Fastolf lands was partially settled via an agreement between Paston and one of Fastolf's trustees under his written will, William Waynflete, Bishop of Winchester. The agreement provided that Paston would be entitled to the manors of Caister, Hellesdon and Drayton, as well as certain other properties, while Waynflete would take possession of the rest of the Fastolf lands to provide payment to priests and poor men to pray for Fastolf's soul as part of the Bishop's new foundation of Magdalen College, Oxford. Implementation of the agreement was delayed by the fact that Caister still remained in the hands of the Duke of Norfolk. However at the Readeption of Henry VI in the fall of 1470 Paston's connections to John de Vere, 13th Earl of Oxford, then Lord High Constable of England, were instrumental in forcing Norfolk to surrender possession of Caister to Paston.

Paston and his brother, John, fought with Oxford on the losing side at the Battle of Barnet in April 1471, and although they were both pardoned by Edward IV, Norfolk once again seized Caister, and the Pastons were also forced to give up the manor of Drayton to John de la Pole, 2nd Duke of Suffolk. From 1473 to 1477 Paston was frequently in Calais, serving under Lord Hastings, then Lieutenant of Calais. In 1473 he went to Bruges, where he had himself measured for a complete set of armour by the armourer of Anthony, Bastard of Burgundy. After Norfolk's death without issue in January 1476, the Pastons finally regained possession of Caister.

Paston made his will 31 October 1477. In October 1479 he was in London, in great fear of 'the sickness’. He died in November, and was buried in the chapel of Our Lady at the Whitefriars, London. As he had no legitimate issue, he was succeeded by his younger brother, John.

According to Tait, Paston's correspondence is the liveliest in the Paston Letters, and his literary interests ranged from Ovid's Ars Amatoria to works of theology:

His letters and those of his friends, with their touches of sprightly if somewhat broad humour, light up the grave and decorous pages of the Paston ‘Correspondence.’ Disliking the business details forced upon him by his position, he is happier when matchmaking for his brother, or stealing a lady's muskball on his behalf, sending his mother salad oil or treacle of Genoa with appropriate comments, or rallying the Duchess of Norfolk not over delicately on her interesting condition. His taste for literature seems to have been real and catholic, ranging from the ‘Ars Amoris’ to treatises on wisdom, not excluding theology; on the death of his mother's chaplain he wrote to secure his library. He employed a transcriber, one piece of whose handiwork, a ‘great book’ containing treatises on knighthood and war, an account of the tournament between Lord Scales and the Bastard and other items, is still preserved in the British Museum (Lansdowne MS. 285).

== Betrothal and issue ==
Paston never married. He was long betrothed to Anne Haute, the daughter of William Haute, Esquire, M.P. (died 1462), of Bishopsbourne, Kent, and Joan Woodville, daughter of Richard Woodville. Sir William Haute and Richard Haute Esq. of Ightham Mote were two of her brothers. Anne Haute's sister, Alice Haute (born c.1444), was the second wife of Sir John Fogge, and both Anne and Alice were first cousins of Elizabeth Woodville, wife of Edward IV, and of Anthony Woodville, 2nd Earl Rivers. From 1471 both Anne Haute and Sir John Paston sought to be released from the marriage contract; however it was not abrogated until sometime after the end of 1477. In 1478 it was said that Paston was to marry another kinswoman of the Queen.

By a mistress, Constance Reynforth, Paston had an illegitimate daughter, Constance.
