= John Paston (died 1466) =

Member of the Parliament of England

- Born: 10 October 1421
- Died: 21/22 May 1466 (aged 44); London, England
- Resting place: Bromholm Priory, Norfolk, England; 52.844479°N 1.487463°E
- Era: Late Middle Ages
- Known for: Paston Letters
- Spouse: Margaret Mautby
- Children: 7, including Sir John Paston and Sir John Paston
- Parents: William Paston (father); Agnes Barry (mother)

John Paston I (10 October 1421 – 21/22 May 1466) was an English country gentleman and landowner. He was the eldest son of the judge William Paston, Justice of the Common Pleas. After he succeeded his father in 1444, his life was marked by conflict occasioned by a power struggle in East Anglia between the dukes of Suffolk and Norfolk, and by his involvement in the affairs of his wife's kinsman, Sir John Fastolf. Between 1460–1466 he was Justice of the Peace for Norfolk, and was elected as a member of parliament in 1460 and again in 1461. A number of his letters survive among the Paston Letters, a rich source of historical information for the lives of the English gentry of the period.

== Family ==
John Paston, born 10 October 1421, was the eldest son and heir of William Paston, Justice of the Common Pleas, and Agnes Barry (d. 18 August 1479), daughter and coheir of Sir Edmund Barry (d. 1433) of Horwellbury, near Therfield and Royston, Hertfordshire. He had three younger brothers, two of whom, Edmund and Clement, died without issue. Another brother, William, married Anne Beaufort, third daughter of Edmund Beaufort, 2nd Duke of Somerset. He also had a sister, Elizabeth Paston (1 July 1429 – 1 February 1488), who married firstly Sir Robert Poynings, slain at the Second Battle of St Albans on 17 February 1461, and secondly Sir George Browne of Betchworth Castle (beheaded on Tower Hill, 4 December 1483).

== Career ==
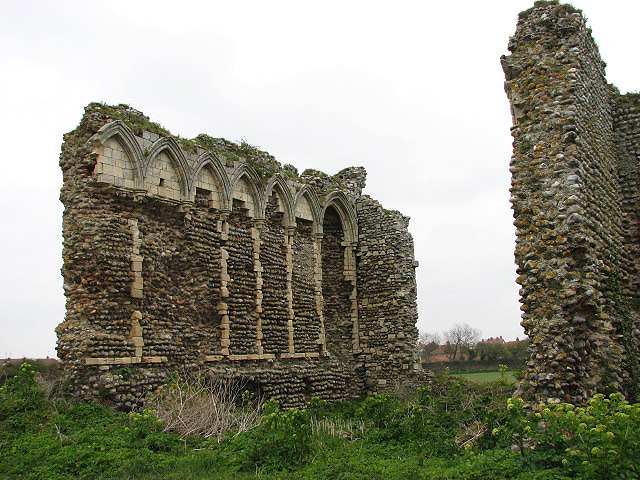
Ruins of Bromholm Priory, Norfolk, where John Paston was buried

Paston was educated at Trinity Hall and Peterhouse at the University of Cambridge, and like his father, became a lawyer. He was admitted to the Inner Temple by 1440, and succeeded his father, when only 22 years of age, in 1444.

Although Paston inherited a substantial estate, in the latter 1440s the family suffered 'a series of reverses', including the loss of the manor of East Beckham in 1445 . The circumstances of these reverses are recounted in the Paston Letters, and the situation has given rise to conflicting views. On the one hand, it has been argued that through his influence with Henry VI, William de la Pole, Duke of Suffolk, became the dominant magnate in East Anglia, ousting John Mowbray, 3rd Duke of Norfolk, from his rightful position, and the Paston reverses have been held to 'demonstrate the extent to which gentry society in East Anglia suffered from the depredations of [Suffolk's] followers', two of whom, Sir Thomas Tuddenham and John Heydon of Baconsthorpe, are considered to have, with their armed posses, harassed local gentry, including the Pastons and their servants and tenants.

On the other hand, Suffolk had already established himself in East Anglia during the 1430s, and it is possible to view Norfolk as the nobleman who was attempting to become the dominant magnate in the region in the 1440s, and the Paston family's difficulties during this period as a result of this power struggle, and perhaps as a result of personal animosity between John Heydon and the Pastons.

In February 1448, "almost certainly on Heydon's initiative", Robert Hungerford, 3rd Baron Hungerford, asserted his wife's claim to Paston's manor of Gresham. Paston attempted to recover the manor through both negotiation and legal action, and when these proved fruitless, sent his wife Margaret to reside in a house in the town in October 1448. In the following January Hungerford's servants assaulted and damaged the house, forcing Margaret Paston to leave. Hungerford remained in possession of Gresham for the next three years.

Among Paston's associates during this difficult period were the courtier Thomas Daniel, Margaret Paston's kinsman, Sir John Fastolf, and the Duke of Norfolk. However, none of these connections afforded Paston any practical support, and about May 1449 Paston's wife Margaret wrote to him advising that local opinion was of the view that he should try to reach a rapprochement with Suffolk.

Suffolk fell from power at the beginning of 1450, and early in 1451 Paston regained possession of the manor of Gresham. During the years 1450–51 he was involved in attempts by the Duke of Norfolk, John de Vere, 12th Earl of Oxford, and Sir John Fastolf to remove Suffolk's servants from positions of local power. These efforts were ultimately unsuccessful, and, by mid-1451, Suffolk's widow, Alice (d. 1475), and Thomas Scales, 7th Baron Scales, had assumed Suffolk's former position of power in East Anglia.

In 1455 he was elected as one of the Knights of the Shire for Norfolk, but did not take a seat in Parliament as the Duke of Norfolk 'insisted on his own nominees being returned'. In 1457 he paid a fine for declining a knighthood. In 1458 Paston, his brother William and others were accused of 'riotous behaviour', and the Duke of Norfolk headed a commission charged with arresting them. From 1460 to 1466 he was Justice of the Peace for Norfolk, and was elected as a member of parliament in 1460 and again in 1461. In 1461, as a result of conflict with Sir John Howard, then Sheriff of Norfolk, he was briefly imprisoned in the Fleet. In 1464, in connection with his involvement in the estate of the late Sir John Fastolf, he was accused of trespass, outlawed, and imprisoned in the Fleet. In 1465 he was imprisoned in the Fleet for the third time, again in connection with Fastolf's estate.

Much of Paston's time from the mid-1450s had in fact been taken up by his position as adviser to his wife's kinsman, 'the ageing, wealthy, and childless Sir John Fastolf'. In 1456 he was appointed one of the feoffees of Fastolf's lands. In June 1459 Fastolf made a will which provided that his ten executors found a college in Caister. However, after Fastolf died on 5 November 1459, Paston claimed that on 3 November Fastolf had made a nuncupative will giving Paston exclusive authority over the foundation of the college, and providing that, after payment of 4000 marks, Paston was to have all Fastolf's lands in Norfolk and Suffolk. Relying on the nuncupative will, Paston took possession of the Fastolf estates, and resided at times at Fastolf's manors of Caister and Hellesdon.

Paston's claim to the Fastolf lands was challenged by the Duke of Norfolk, who seized Caister in 1461; by Sir William Yelverton and Gilbert Debenham, who claimed the manors of Cotton in Suffolk and Caldecott Hall near Fritton; by John de la Pole, 2nd Duke of Suffolk, who claimed two Norfolk manors, Hellesdon and Drayton, in 1465; and by Lord Scales, who in January 1466 forced officials of the city of Norwich to seize Paston's property there in the king's name, alleging that Paston was a 'serf of the crown'. In 1464 a legal challenge to Paston's executorship under the nuncupative will was mounted by William Yelverton, one of the ten executors who had been appointed under Sir John Fastolf's written will; however, the case was still undecided at the time of Paston's death.

During the latter years of his life, Paston fell out with his eldest son and heir (despite his wife's unceasing attempts at reconciling her husband and son), John, who died in 1479. Father and son reconciled in May 1465. The elder John Paston died at London on 21 or 22 May 1466, and was buried at Bromholm Priory, Norfolk.

Several of John Paston's letters survive among the Paston Letters.

== Marriage and issue ==
Paston married, between April and November 1440, Margaret Mautby (d. 1484), the daughter and heir of John Mautby of Mautby, Norfolk, by whom he had five sons and two daughters:

- Sir John Paston (1442–1479), eldest son and heir, who never married, although he was long betrothed to Anne Haute, the daughter of Sir William Haute (d. 1464) of Bishopsbourne, Kent, and Joan Woodville, daughter of Richard Woodville. Anne Haute's sister, Alice (born c. 1444), was the second wife of Sir John Fogge, and both Anne and Alice were first cousins of Elizabeth Woodville, wife of Edward IV. By a mistress, Constance Reynforth, Sir John Paston had an illegitimate daughter, Constance.
- Sir John Paston (1444–1504), who succeeded his brother, and married firstly Margery Brewes (d. 1495), daughter of Sir Thomas Brewes (d. 17 June 1482) of Topcroft, Norfolk, by his second wife Elizabeth Debenham, sister of Gilbert Debenham, by whom he had two sons, Christopher and William (father of Eleanor Paston, Countess of Rutland), and a daughter, Elizabeth. He married, secondly, to Agnes, the twice-widowed daughter of Nicholas Morley of Glynde, Sussex.
- Edmund Paston (d. before 8 February 1504), who married firstly, about 1480, Katherine Spelman (d. 18 April 1491), widow of William Clippesby, and daughter of John Spelman, by whom he had a son, Robert, and secondly, Margaret Monceaux (died circa 1505), widow successively of William Lomnor and Thomas Briggs. Between 1486 and 1489 John de Vere, 13th Earl of Oxford, appointed him receiver of lands which had formerly belonged to Thomas, Lord Scales.
- Walter Paston (c. 1456 – c. 18 August 1479), who died in Norwich on or after 18 August 1479, a few weeks after graduating from the University of Oxford, and was buried in the church of St Peter Hungate.
- William Paston (born c.1459). He was at Eton in 1478 and 1479, and in 1487 entered the service of John de Vere, 13th Earl of Oxford. In about 1503 or 1504 he was dismissed from the Earl's service, being 'so troubled with sickness and crazed in his mind'.
- Margery Paston (born c.1450), who in 1469 married her lover, Richard Calle, the Paston family's steward, by whom she had three sons, John, William and Richard.
- Anne Paston (d. 1494/5), who married, before June 1477, William Yelverton (d.1500), grandson of Sir William Yelverton, by whom she had a child who died young.
