= Margaret Paston =

English heiress and author (1421/2–1484)

- Born: Margaret Mautby c. 1422/1423; Reedham, Norfolk, England
- Died: 1484
- Resting place: Mautby Church, Mautby, England
- Other names: Margaret de Mauteby; Margaret Mautby Paston
- Known for: Correspondence
- Spouse: John Paston I (m. 1441)
- Children: At least 7
- Father: John Mautby

Margaret Paston (née Mautby or de Mauteby; c. 1422/1423 – 1484) was an English gentlewoman and one of the foremost authors of the Paston Letters, with over 100 surviving letters attributed to her.

== Biography ==
Margaret Mautby was born in Reedham, Norfolk, the daughter and only child of Margery Berney and John Mautby. Her father died in 1433 when she was young, leaving her the sole heiress to his estates around Mautby.

Circa 1441, she married John Paston I, a landowner and recently qualified lawyer in an arranged marriage, having met in 1440. The couple's first home was in Gresham, a property purchased by William Paston. John spent much of his time away at the Inns of Court in London, leaving Margaret to manage his estates.

During this time with John away and Margaret acting as custodian, the Pastons fell into multiple property disputes that escalated to violence. A particularly notable letter from Margaret to John was written in 1448 amid a siege on Gresham by Lord Moleyns, requesting ammunitions and other siege provisions. In 1459, John inherited Caister Castle from Sir John Fastolf. This was controversial, and Margaret attempted to advise John in the face of challenges to the claim, which were not resolved by the time of his death in 1466. In 1469, the Duke of Suffolk laid siege to Caister. Margaret and her younger son John III held down the fort with only 30 men for two months before they were forced to surrender. The aforementioned castles were subsequently recovered.

The couple had seven children including five sons and two daughters, the first born in spring 1442, who lived to adulthood. After her husband's death, Margaret continued writing letters, particularly to her two eldest sons. She retired to Great Yarmouth.

== Death and legacy ==
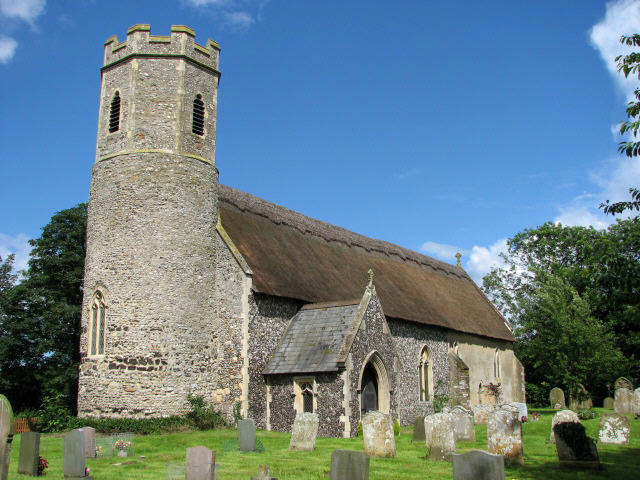
St Peter and St Paul Church, Mautby

Per her will, Margaret was buried at Mautby Church.

Margaret is remembered as one of the foremost authors of the Paston Letters, credited with writing or directing 104 of the surviving letters. In her review of Joel T. Rosenthal's book Margaret Paston's Piety (2010), historian Diane Watt called her the "most prolific letter writer in medieval England", saying "it is not only the quantity of her letters that is noteworthy. These letters provide a vivid insight into life in a late-medieval English household during the turmoil of the Wars of the Roses". Rosenthal suggests Margaret Paston might provide an example closer to what might be considered a "conventional" woman of the time compared to the likes of Julian of Norwich and Margery Kempe.

In 2019, a new memorial stone to Margaret was placed near her burial place at St Peter and St Paul's Church in Mautby, Norfolk.
