= John Paston (died 1504) =

Member of the Parliament of England

Sir John Paston
- Born: 1444
- Died: 28 August 1504 (aged 59–60)
- Spouses: Margery Brews; Agnes Morley
- Issue: Christopher Paston; Sir William Paston; Elizabeth Paston; Anne Paston; Dorothy Paston; Philip Paston; Philippa Paston
- Father: John Paston
- Mother: Margaret Mautby

Sir John Paston (1444 – 28 August 1504), was the second son of John Paston and Margaret Mautby. He succeeded his elder brother, Sir John Paston, in 1479. He fought at Barnet and Stoke with John de Vere, 13th Earl of Oxford, served as his deputy when Oxford was appointed Lord High Admiral of England, and was a member of the Earl's council. A number of his letters survive among the Paston Letters, a rich source of historical information about the lives of the English gentry of the period.

== Family ==
John Paston, born in 1444, probably at Geldeston, Norfolk, was the second son of John Paston and Margaret Mautby, daughter and heir of John Mautby of Mautby, Norfolk. He had an elder brother, also named John, as well as three younger brothers, Edmund, Walter and William, and two sisters, Margery and Anne.

== Career ==
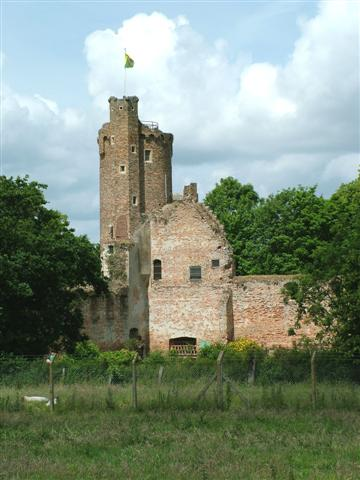
Ruins of Caister Castle, which Sir John Paston surrendered in 1469 after a siege by the Duke of Norfolk

Nothing is known of his education. In his youth, he actively assisted his mother with the management of the Paston estates. He served under John Mowbray, 4th Duke of Norfolk, from 1462 to 1464, at both Holt Castle in Denbighshire, and Newcastle upon Tyne, and in October 1465 was invited, as 'one of our servants of household', to attend the celebration of Norfolk's coming of age. In July 1468 he and his elder brother John were in the retinue which attended Edward IV's sister, Margaret of York, to Bruges for her marriage to Charles the Bold.

Paston's father claimed to have inherited, via a nuncupative will, the lands of the wealthy and childless Sir John Fastolf, a kinsman of Paston's mother. The claim was actively opposed by the trustees who had been appointed under Fastolf's written will, and in particular by the Mowbray Dukes of Norfolk, father and son, who claimed Caister Castle. In August 1469 John Mowbray, 4th Duke of Norfolk, in whose service Paston had formerly been, laid siege to Caister, and although Paston held out for a time, he was forced to surrender the castle about 25 September.

In August 1470 Paston went to Esher to take part in negotiations for the settlement of Fastolf's estate with one of the principal trustees under Fastolf's written will, William Waynflete, Bishop of Winchester.

In April 1471 he was wounded, while fighting with his elder brother, John, and John de Vere, 13th Earl of Oxford on the losing Lancastrian side at the Battle of Barnet. He was pardoned the following July.

During this period he visited Framlingham on several occasions to negotiate with the Duke of Norfolk's council for the restoration of Caister to his elder brother, John in return for a monetary payment.

He intended to make a pilgrimage to Santiago de Compostela in the summer of 1473, although there is no evidence that he did so. In 1475 he was briefly in Calais. In November 1479 his elder brother, John, died, and he took steps to secure possession of his brother's estate, but was 'much obstructed' by his uncle, William Paston. On 10 March 1484, he received a pardon from Richard III. He served on numerous commissions in Norfolk at this time, and in 1485 was Member of Parliament for Norwich, and Sheriff of Norfolk and Suffolk.

By the beginning of 1487, he was in the service of John de Vere, 13th Earl of Oxford, and referred to by the Earl as his 'right trusty and right well-beloved councillor'. He fought at the Battle of Stoke on 16 June 1487, and was made a knight banneret on the field by King Henry VII. Oxford, who on 21 September 1485 had been appointed Lord High Admiral of England, made Paston his deputy. In 1500 Henry VII commanded him to be in attendance at the arrival of Catherine of Aragon in England, although in the event her arrival was postponed.

He died 28 August 1504.

== Marriages and issue ==
He married, firstly, Margery Brewes (d. 1495), by whom he had two sons and a daughter. She was the daughter of Sir Thomas Brewes (died 17 June 1482) of Topcroft, Norfolk, by his second wife, Elizabeth Debenham, sister of Gilbert Debenham. It may have been a love marriage: Margery wrote to John two Valentines in 1477, the first known to exist in England, in which she addresses him with obvious affection as "my right well-beloved Valentine".

Their children were:

- Christopher Paston (born 1478). He is not mentioned in the will of his grandmother Margaret Paston, and must have died before 1482.
- William Paston (c. 1479–1554), who married Bridget Heydon, daughter of Sir Henry Heydon (d.1504). He was at Cambridge about 1495, was Sheriff of Norfolk and Suffolk in 1517–18, was knighted by 1520, and attended at the Field of Cloth of Gold. Their daughter was Eleanor Paston, Countess of Rutland.
- Elizabeth Paston.

He married, secondly, to Agnes, the twice-widowed daughter of Nicholas Morley of Glynde, Sussex.

The burial place of Anne (or Ann/Anna), a previously unknown daughter of John, was discovered in Oxnead church near Aylsham, Norfolk on 28 May 2019 but it is uncertain whether her mother was Margery or Agnes. Through this, three further siblings of Anne's were discovered: Dorothy, who married Thomas Hardres, Philippa, and Philip.
