= Gilbert Debenham =

English knight

Sir Gilbert Debenham Jnr.
- Born: 1432; Little Wenham, Suffolk, England
- Died: 1500 (aged 67-68)
- Occupations: Knight, Politician
- Known for: Lord Chancellor of Ireland

Sir Gilbert Debenham (junior) (1432–1500) was an English knight, politician and soldier who served briefly as Lord Chancellor of Ireland. Although, like his father before him, he had a notorious reputation for lawlessness, he flourished in the reign of King Edward IV, due in part to his loyalty to Edward during the great political crisis of the years 1469–71. Under Henry VII he was attainted for treason and spent his last years in prison. He figures prominently in the Paston Letters.

== Background and reputation ==
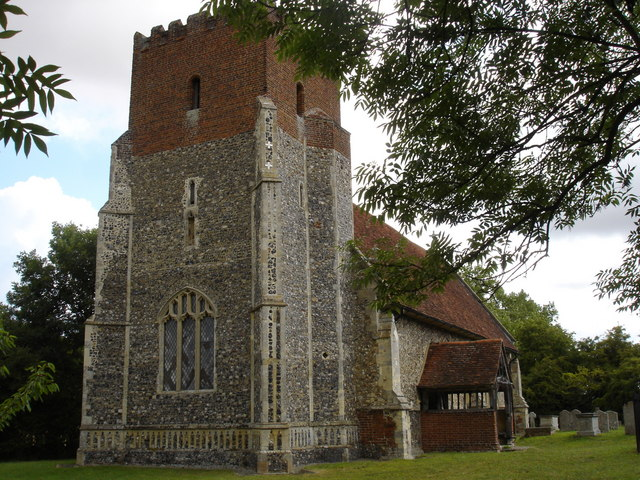
Little Wenham, Church of St Lawrence

He was born at Little Wenham in Suffolk, son of Sir Gilbert Debenham senior (c.1404–1481) who was justice of the peace, High Sheriff of Norfolk and Suffolk for 1427, Member of Parliament and steward to the Mowbray Dukes of Norfolk. He was the fourth of four successive Gilbert Debenhams. He was the grandson of Gilbert Debenham, MP who died in 1417.

Historians in general have little good to say of either of the Debenhams, father or son. They have been called a "pair of thorough-going villains", with a reputation for "violent and thuggish behaviour", although the son's reputation was perhaps somewhat better than that of his father, who was accused of corrupting the town governments of Ipswich and Colchester for his own profit. Edward IV's biographer notes that there were many similar characters in fifteenth-century England, and that in return for their support the King was prepared to tolerate a degree of lawless conduct on their part. Only when the younger Gilbert crossed the line into overt treason did a later King, Henry VII, bring him down.

== Early career ==
Like his father, the younger Gilbert was in the service of John Mowbray, 4th Duke of Norfolk. He also obtained a royal office, the Clerk of the Market, in 1461. He sat in the House of Commons as MP for Ipswich 1455–56 and was knighted about 1461.

From 1465 onwards the Debenhams were in violent conflict with the Paston family over possession of Caldecott Hall, near Fritton in Suffolk. In September 1465 Gilbert junior tried to seize the manor but failed. He and John Paston junior both began raising private armies to fight the matter out, but the Duke of Norfolk, whom they both served, intervened and bound them to keep the peace.

In 1469 the Duke of Norfolk himself turned against the Pastons, and laid claim to Caister Castle (which the Pastons had inherited from Sir John Fastolf). Norfolk took the castle after a long siege in which at least one man died. Debenham fought on Norfolk's side, although he does not seem to have played a leading part in the siege. His relations with the Pastons improved somewhat in the next decade, and in 1477 John Paston married Gilbert's niece Margery Brewes.

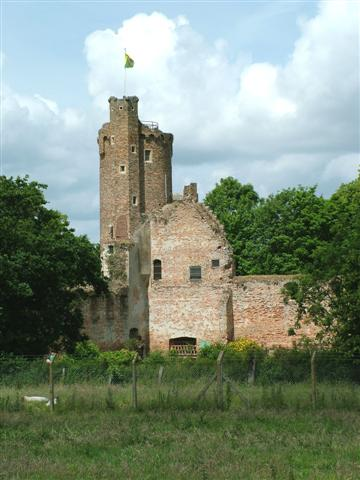
Caister Castle

== Career under Edward IV ==
During the brief Lancastrian restoration known as the Readeption of Henry VI, Gilbert remained loyal to Edward IV. He went with him into exile, and in March 1471, as Edward attempted to re-invade England, Gilbert was entrusted with the task of reporting whether it would be safe to land in Norfolk, and advised rightly that it would not be. After Edward's triumph he was made one of the King's carvers and a justice of the peace.

In 1473–4, partly in response to pleas from the Parliament of Ireland, Edward IV made one of his intermittent efforts to assert his authority over Ireland. Debenham was appointed Lord Chancellor and sent to Ireland to restore order, with a troop of four hundred men. Despite his strong personality and undoubted political skills, he was no more successful than most English statesmen of the time in the admittedly onerous task of governing Ireland. He had returned to England by 1476, when he is heard of in the Marshalsea prison, having presumably been imprisoned there for debt. He was soon released from prison. He played a prominent part in organizing Edward's funeral, and his career continued to flourish under Richard III.

== Treason ==
After the downfall of the House of York in 1485, the new King Henry VII at first was prepared to use Debenham's services: he was pardoned for his adherence to Richard III in 1488, and sent to Ireland again as constable of Carrickfergus Castle in 1491; he also received the office of Keeper of the Royal mines in Ireland.

In February 1495 Sir William Stanley (who had won the Battle of Bosworth for the Tudor dynasty) was executed for supporting the claim to the throne of the pretender Perkin Warbeck, largely on the evidence of Sir Robert Clifford, who named Debenham as one of Stanley's co-conspirators. Debenham was condemned to death for treason. His life was spared but he remained in prison until 1499, when his sister Elizabeth Brewes, in return for paying a large fine, obtained a pardon for her brother and a promise that the attainder would be reversed. Gilbert died in 1500 but Elizabeth's son Robert later succeeded in having the attainder lifted.

== Family ==
About 1469 he married Katherine Plumpton, widow of William, 6th Baron Zouche; she died about 1472 without issue. His sister Elizabeth married Sir Thomas Brewes, High Sheriff of Suffolk. In addition to their son Robert, who was his uncle Gilbert's heir, they had several daughters, of whom the best known is Margery, whose Valentines to her future husband John Paston appear to be the first surviving examples of Valentines in the English language.
