= Gilbert Debenham (disambiguation) =

Gilbert Debenham (1432–1500) was Lord Chancellor of Ireland.

Gilbert Debenham may also refer to:

- Gilbert Debenham (died 1417), MP for Suffolk; father of Gilbert Debenham (died 1481)
- Gilbert Debenham (died 1369), father of Gilbert Debenham (died 1417)
- Gilbert Debenham (died 1481), MP for Suffolk and Ipswich; father of Gilbert Debenham (1432–1500)
