= Geoffrey Spirleng =

English scribe

Geoffrey Spirleng (c. 1426-c. 1494) was an English scribe. He worked for John Fastolf, and was common clerk of Norwich from 1471 to 1491. As common clerk of Norwich, he was responsible for the register known as the Old Free Book. Spirleng is best known to English literary history as the scribe of MS Hunter 197 (U.1.1), a volume of the Canterbury Tales that he copied with his son, Thomas.
