= Paston Letters =

Collection of 15th century writings of the Paston family

The Paston Letters are a collection of correspondence between members of the Paston family of Norfolk gentry and others connected with them in England between the years 1422 and 1509. The collection also includes state papers and other important documents.

The letters are a noted primary source for information about life in England during the Wars of the Roses and the early Tudor period. They are also of interest to linguists and historians of the English language, being written during the Great Vowel Shift, and documenting the transition from Late Middle English to Early Modern English.

== History of the collection ==
The large collection of letters and papers was acquired in 1735 from the executors of the estate of William Paston, 2nd Earl of Yarmouth, the last in the Paston line, by the antiquary Francis Blomefield. On Blomefield's death in 1752 they came into the possession of Thomas Martin of Palgrave, Suffolk. On his death in 1771 some letters passed into the hands of John Ives, while many others were purchased by John Worth, a chemist at Diss, whose executors sold them in 1774 to Sir John Fenn of East Dereham.

== Published editions ==
=== Edited by John Fenn ===
In 1787 John Fenn published a selection of the letters in two volumes, bringing general interest to the collection. Fenn published two further volumes of letters in 1789. Before he died in 1794 he prepared a fifth volume for publication, which was posthumously published in 1823 by his nephew William Frere. In 1787 Fenn presented the originals of his first two volumes to King George III, who knighted Fenn on 23 May 1787. Shortly thereafter, the manuscripts for all five volumes disappeared, casting doubt on the authenticity of the letters. In 1865 their authenticity was questioned by Herman Merivale in the Fortnightly Review, but James Gairdner countered that they were genuine in the same periodical. Within a year, Gairdner was proven right by the discovery of the originals of the fifth volume, together with other letters and papers, by Frere's son, Philip Frere, in his house at Dungate. Ten years later the originals of Fenn's third and fourth volumes, with ninety-five unpublished letters, were found at Roydon Hall, Norfolk, the seat of George Frere. Finally the originals of the two remaining volumes were rediscovered in 1889 at Orwell Park, Ipswich, in the residence of Captain E. G. Pretyman. The last letters to be found were the letters presented to George III; they may have reached Orwell through Sir George Pretyman Tomline, the tutor and friend of William Pitt the Younger.

Most of the Paston letters and associated documents are now in the British Library, but some are in the Bodleian Library, Oxford at Magdalen College, with a few at Pembroke College, Cambridge.

=== Edited by James Gairdner ===
Fenn's edition of the Paston Letters was considered definitive until 1872, when James Gairdner published the first volume of a new edition. Taking Fenn's work as a basis, Gairdner ultimately published over four hundred previously unpublished letters in three volumes. Gairdner's edition included notes and an index, and introductions to each volume containing a survey of the reign of King Henry VI. Before he had published all the volumes of his edition, some letters that he had written about were discovered in 1875 at Roydon. These unpublished letters were added as a supplement to a subsequent three-volume edition published in 1896. In 1904 Gairdner edited a complete edition of the Paston Letters in six volumes, containing 1,088 letters and papers with a new introduction.

==== List of volumes ====
===== 1896 edition =====
The Paston Letters 1422–1509 AD: A New Edition First Published in 1874 Containing Upwards of Four Hundred Letters, Etc., Hitherto Unpublished. Edited by James Gairdner of the Public Record Office

- Volume 1, Henry VI 1422–1461, Westminster, 1896
- Volume 2, Edward IV 1461–1471, Westminster, 1896
- Volume 3, Edward IV – Henry VII 1471–1509, Westminster, 1896

===== 1900/1910 edition =====
Paston Letters 1422–1509 AD: A Reprint of the Edition of 1872–5 which Contained upwards of Five Hundred Letters, etc., till then Unpublished to Which are now Added Others in a Supplement after the Introduction. Edited by James Gairdner of the Public Record Office

- Volume 1, Henry VI 1422–1461, Edinburgh, 1910
- Volume 2, Edward IV 1461–1471, Edinburgh, 1910
- Volume 3, Edward IV – Henry VII, Westminster, 1900 Edinburgh, 1910

===== 1904 edition =====
The Paston Letters AD 1422–1509: New Complete Library Edition, Edited with Notes and an Introduction by James Gairdner of the Public Record Office

- Volume 1, London & Exeter, 1904
- Volume 2, London & Exeter, 1904
- Volume 3, London & Exeter, 1904
- Volume 4, London & Exeter, 1904
- Volume 5, London & Exeter, 1904
- Volume 6, London & Exeter, 1904

=== Edited by Norman Davis ===
In 1971, Norman Davis published a new edition, which was revised and expanded by Richard Beadle and Colin Richmond in 2004.

=== Edited by Diane Watt ===
In 2004, Diane Watt published The Paston Women: Selected Letters, which situates the letters in the context of medieval women's writing and medieval letter writing.

== Biographies of Paston family ==
Two recent books have presented the story of the fifteenth-century Pastons for a wider audience, A Medieval Family by Frances and Joseph Gies (1998) and Blood and Roses by Helen Castor (2004).

== Chronology ==
=== The early Pastons ===
The family of Paston takes its name from a Norfolk village about twenty miles (32 km) north of Norwich. The first member of the family about whom anything is known is Clement Paston (d.1419), a yeoman holding and cultivating about one hundred acres (40 hectares) of land. His wife, Beatrice Somerton (d.1409), is said to have been 'a bond woman', but her brother, Geoffrey Somerton (d.1416), became a lawyer, and it was Geoffrey who paid for the education, both at grammar school and at the Inns of Court, of his nephew, William Paston (1378–1444), son of Clement and Beatrice. William, who is described as a "right cunning man" in the law, attained an influential position in his profession, and in 1429 became a Justice of the Common Pleas. He bought a good deal of land in Norfolk, including property in Paston and Gresham Castle, and improved his social position by his marriage with Agnes Barry (d.1479), the daughter and coheir of Sir Edmund Barry or Berry of Horwellbury, near Therfield and Royston, Hertfordshire. Agnes emerges from the letters as a difficult and quick-tempered woman, whose quarrels with the Paston villagers leave some valuable examples of colloquial English in the 1450s. She frequently quarrelled with her children.

On his death, William left a large and valuable inheritance to John Paston, the eldest of his four sons, who was already married to Margaret (d. 1484), daughter of John Mautby of Mautby, Norfolk. England was experiencing instability at this time; the nobles surrounding the king did not allow him sufficient power to govern, and much of England was effectively lawless. A lawyer like his father, John Paston spent much of his time in London, leaving his wife to look after his business in Norfolk, a task which Margaret, a sensible and competent woman, managed with considerable skill. Many of the letters were written by Margaret to her husband in London. The letters written during the lifetimes of John Paston and his eldest son, also named John, are most numerous and provide the most insight, not only on their family matters but on the overall history of England.

In 1448, Paston's manor of Gresham was seized by Robert Hungerford, Lord Moleyns (1431–1464), and, although it was afterwards recovered, the owner could obtain no redress for the loss and injury he had sustained. Moreover, Paston had become intimate with the wealthy knight Sir John Fastolf, who was a kinsman of Paston's wife, Margaret, and who had employed him on several matters.

At his death, Fastolf left his affairs in disorder. As was customary in his time, he left many of his estates in Norfolk and Suffolk to feoffees including Sir William Yelverton, John Paston and his brother William, retaining the revenues for himself. His written will tasked his ten executors with founding a college at Caister. However, two days before his death, according to John Paston, Fastolf made a nuncupative (spoken) will in which he bequeathed all his lands in Norfolk and Suffolk to Paston, for a payment of 4,000 marks and the duty of founding the college at Caister.

Taking possession of the lands, Paston's claims were challenged: several noblemen claimed the estates. The excluded executors litigated, and Paston fell under the threat of violence. A feud broke out between John de la Pole, Duke of Suffolk, and the Pastons under Margaret and her eldest son, John, around Drayton and Hellesdon. Caister Castle was seized by John Mowbray, 3rd Duke of Norfolk, while similar occurrences took place at other estates. In 1460 and 1461, Paston returned to parliament as a knight of the shire for Norfolk, and, enjoying the favour of Edward IV, had regained his castle at Caister. He fell out of favour, however, and was imprisoned on three occasions. Paston died in May 1466, with the suit concerning Fastolf's will still proceeding in the church courts.

=== John and Margaret Paston's sons and descendants ===
John and Margaret Paston left five sons and two daughters. The eldest, Sir John Paston (1442–1479), had been knighted during his father's lifetime. He was frequently at the court of Edward IV, but afterwards favoured the Lancastrian party, and, with his younger brother, also named John, fought for Henry VI at the Battle of Barnet. Meanwhile, the struggle over Paston's estates continued, although in 1461 the king and council had declared that Paston's ancestors were not bondmen, and consequently that his title to his father's lands was valid. Caister Castle was taken after a siege by John Mowbray, 4th Duke of Norfolk (1444–1476), and then recovered by the Pastons, and retaken by the duke. But in 1474 an arrangement was made with William Waynflete, Bishop of Winchester, the representative of the excluded executors, by which some of the estates were surrendered to the bishop for charitable purposes, while Paston was secured in the possession of others. Two years later the death of the Duke of Norfolk made the restoration of Caister Castle possible, but in 1478 a quarrel broke out with John de la Pole, 2nd Duke of Suffolk.

Sir John Paston, who was a cultured man, was anxious to recover Caister, but he left the task to his mother and to the younger John. Owing to his carelessness and extravagance, the family lands were also diminished by sales, but nevertheless when he died unmarried in November 1479 he left a substantial inheritance to his younger brother John. Although he didn't marry he did have an illegitimate daughter, Constance, who is mentioned in his mother's will. About this time the Letters become scanty and less interesting, but the family continued to flourish. The younger John Paston (d. 1504), after quarrelling with his uncle William over the manors of Oxnead and Marlingford, was knighted at the Battle of Stoke in 1487. He married Margery, daughter of Sir Thomas Brewes, and left a son, William Paston (c. 1479–1554), who was also knighted, and who was a prominent figure at the court of Henry VIII. Sir William's second son, John Paston (1510–1575) was the father-in-law of Sir Edward Coke. Sir William's third son, Clement (c. 1515–1597), served his country with distinction on the sea, and was wounded at the Battle of Pinkie.

The family was continued by Sir William's eldest son, Erasmus (b. 1502-d. 1540), whose son William succeeded to his grandfather's estates in 1554, and to those of his uncle Clement in 1597. This William (1528–1610) was knighted in 1578. He was the founder of the Paston Grammar School at North Walsham, and made Oxnead Hall, near Norwich, his principal residence. Christopher Paston was Sir William's son and heir, and Christopher's grandson, William (d. 1663), was created a baronet in 1642; being succeeded in the title by his son Robert (1631–1683), who was a member of parliament from 1661 to 1673, and was created Earl of Yarmouth in 1679. Robert's son William (1652–1732), who married a natural daughter of Charles II, was the second earl, and, like his father, was in high favour with the Stuarts. When he died in 1732 he left no son, and his titles became extinct, his estates being sold to discharge his debts.

== Legacy ==
The disorder revealed by the Paston Letters reflects the general condition of England during this period. The weakness of the government left every branch of the administration disorganized. The succession to the crown itself was contested. Nobility fought a civil war. The prevailing discontent led to the rising of Jack Cade and of the Wars of the Roses. The correspondence reveals the Pastons in a variety of relations to their neighbours – both friendly and hostile. It abounds with illustrations of public events, as well as of the manners and morals of the time, and some valuable examples of colloquial English, such as Agnes Paston's quarrel with her neighbour, Warren Harman, c.1451, where she told him "if his father had do as he did he would a be ashamed to say to me as he said". Particularly remarkable is the habitual acquaintance of educated persons, both men and women, with the law, which was evidently indispensable to persons of substance. Of most interest, however, are the occasional love letters, notably those from Richard Calle to Margery Paston, and Margery Brews' famous Valentines to John Paston III.

In 2019 a small brass memorial plaque, 25 by 8 cm (9 by 3 inches), was found hidden away between two large tombs in Oxnead church near Aylsham in Norfolk, with an inscription in Latin that translates as "Here lies Anna, daughter of John Paston Knight, on whose soul God have mercy, Amen". The style of the plaque dated it to between 1490 and 1510, and it is of a type used to memorialise a young girl. The discovery was a surprise, finding an unknown member of the "most researched family" of medieval England. The discovery was made as part of the three-year Paston Footprints project, described as "an introduction and way in to the amazing hub of links, information, people and places which over six centuries have formed the web based on the Paston Letters".

== Paston family tree ==
Clement	Beatrix Somerton
William I (1378–1444)	Agnes Barry (d. 1479)
John I (1421–1466)	Margaret Mautby (d. 1484)	William II (1436–1488)	Lady Anne Beaufort (d. 1496)
John II (1442–1479)	John III (1444–1504)	Margery Brews (d. 1495)	Edmund II	Margery (d. before 1480)	Richard Calle	William III
William IV (c. 1479–1554)	Bridget Heydon

== Cultural impact ==
The letters were adapted by Australian writer Barbara Jefferis as a radio feature and novel Beloved Lady; the novel was also serialised as a radio drama.

The Paston Letters were Robert Louis Stevenson's main source for The Black Arrow.

The early Paston women are the subject of two Anne O'Brien novels: The Royal Game and A Marriage of Fortune.

== See also ==
- Paston, Norfolk
- Cely Letters
- Plumpton Correspondence
