= Cely Letters =

Rare surviving 15th-century writings

The Cely Letters are a collection of family correspondence written in the 15th century, which describe the lives and business activities of a family of London wool merchants. Key members were Richard Cely and his wife Agnes and their sons Robert, Richard, and George. This collection is one of the few surviving letter collections from the 15th century, along with the Paston Letters and the Stonor Letters. While the Paston Letters cover a period spanning over 3/4 of a century, the Cely Letters cover a much shorter period of time between 1472 and 1488. The Cely letters were preserved only because they were used as evidence in a lawsuit. The Cely Letters are primary sources of information about the English economy and English society at the end of the Wars of the Roses.

== See also ==
- Plumpton Correspondence

== Bibliography ==
- Hanham, Alison. "A fifteenth-century merchant family." History Today (Dec 1963) 13#12 pp 821–829
- Wagner, John A. (2001). Encyclopedia of the Wars of the Roses. ABC-CLIO. ISBN 978-1-85109-358-8.
- Alison, Weir (2004). Princes in the Tower, the. New York: Fawcett. ISBN 978-0-345-39178-0.
- Yngve, Victor; Wasik, Zdzislaw (2006). Hard-Science Linguistics. A&C Black. ISBN 978-0-8264-9239-5.
