= Stonor Letters =

Rare surviving 15th-century writings

The Stonor Letters are one of the significant collections of 15th century correspondence that have survived. This series of documents, though not the earliest private letters known in English, has more number and variety in terms of interest, along with the other two major collections from this period, which are the Paston Letters and the Cely Letters.

== Background ==
Like the Paston family, the Stonor family was founded by a royal judge; his name was John Stonor. The Stonors did not participate in the Wars of the Roses; but Sir William Stoner was nevertheless attainted in 1483, and his papers seized by the crown, as well as his lands. Though the latter were restored, the papers remained in crown ownership - hence their subsequent survival.

== Subject matter ==
Although the letters do not discuss political issues, Charles Lethbridge Kingsford has said that they "do not fall short" for content about English society and social life during the period. Subjects discussed in the letters include local office, estate management, legal business, social and domestic life, marriage and the wool trade. The collection has nearly 400 documents. It also included documents such as wood-sale deeds and accounts.

The letters also provided insights about existing norms. For example, based on the sample of writings, the letters show that women of the propertied class adopted three practices when writing: 1) dictating a letter to a literate transcriber; 2) dictating the content but personally writing a signature, greetings, and postscript; and, 3) writing the letter in its entirety.

Kingsford's transcriptions, however, have been described by one 20th-century scholar as "unreliable". There are scholars who use alternative sources such as Alison Truelove's Fifteenth-century English Stonor letters.

== See also ==
- Statute of the Staple
- Plumpton Correspondence

== Bibliography ==
- Davis, Norman (2004). Paston Letters and Papers of the Fifteenth Century. Oxford University Press. ISBN 978-0-19-722421-2.
- Kingsford, Charles Lethbridge (1919). Kingsford's Stonor Letters and Papers 1290-1483. Cambridge University Press. ISBN 978-0-521-55586-9.
  - Supplementary Stonor Letters and Papers, 1314-1482 (London 1924)
- Weir, Alison (2004). Princes in the Tower, the. New York: Fawcett. ISBN 978-0-345-39178-0.
