= William Plumpton =

English landowner and knight

Sir William Plumpton (1404 – 15 October 1480) was a 15th-century English aristocrat, landowner and administrator. He is also known for his surviving letters, the Plumpton Correspondence.

== Biography ==
He was the grandson of Sir William Plumpton executed in 1405 for treason by Henry IV and the son of Sir Robert Plumpton of Plumpton Hall (in Plompton), Yorkshire. On the death of his father in 1421 he became the ward of Henry Percy, 2nd Earl of Northumberland.

He served in the war against France around 1427–1430 and was then knighted. On his return to England he was appointed by Northumberland as seneschal of Knaresborough Castle and steward of Northumberland's Spofforth estates.

Plumpton's own estates included Plumpton Hall, Yorkshire, Mansfield Woodhouse, Nottinghamshire and Hassop Hall, Derbyshire. He represented Nottinghamshire in the Parliament of 1436–1436. He served as High Sheriff of Yorkshire in 1447 and High Sheriff of Derbyshire in 1453.

During the War of the Roses he fought on the Lancastrian side at the Battle of Towton in 1461, where his son William and his benefactor Henry Percy, 3rd Earl of Northumberland were slain. Plumpton was captured but later was pardoned by Edward IV and regained his offices in 1471.

== Family ==
He had two wives. Plumpton first married Elizabeth Stapleton of Carlton, Yorkshire in 1430, by whom he had seven daughters, all of whom married, and two sons, Robert and William. His second wife was Joan Winteringham, whom he later claimed had married in 1451 following the death of Elizabeth; by her he had one son, Robert, who was regarded as heir, as the older Robert had died in 1450 and William had been killed at Towton.
