= William Worcester =

English chronicler and antiquary (1415–1482)

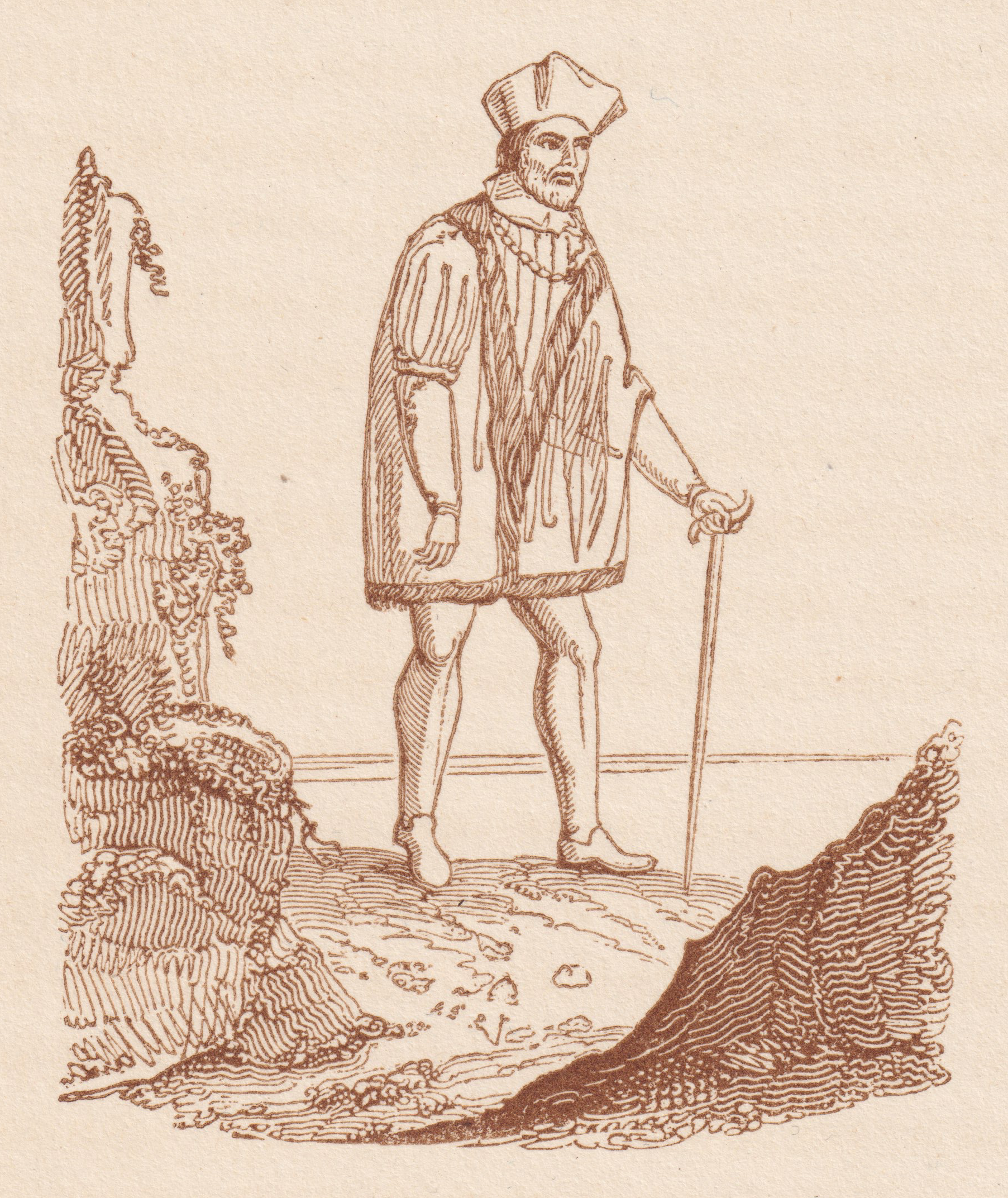
- William Worcester as imagined in William Wyrcestre Redivivus (1823)
- Born: 1415; Bristol
- Died: c. 1482
- Occupation: antiquary
- Known for: writer, antiquarian

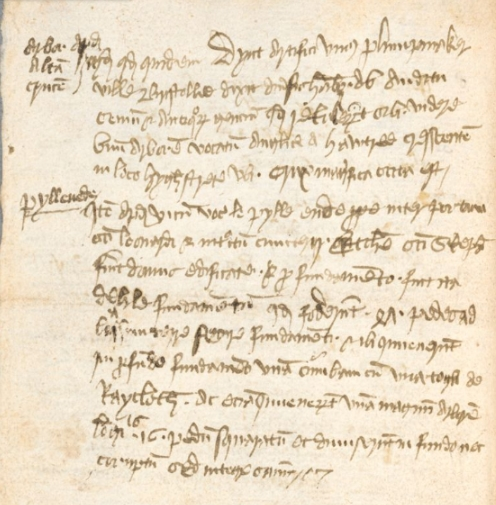
Itinerarium (MS. CCCC Parker 210), p. 196

William Worcester (c. 1415 – c. 1482) was an English antiquary, author, and historian known for his detailed writings on medieval England. He served as the secretary to Sir John Fastolf, a prominent military commander during the Hundred Years' War, and later compiled extensive notes on English history, geography, and heraldry.

Worcester's most notable work includes his Itineraries, which provide valuable descriptions of English towns, castles, and estates in the 15th century. His writings, often fragmented, offer insight into medieval society, warfare, and administration. Though not widely recognized during his lifetime, his contributions have since been regarded as significant sources for historians studying late medieval England.

== Life ==
He was a son of another William of Worcester, a Bristol whittawer (worker in white leather), and his wife Elizabeth, née Botoner. His mother was a daughter of Thomas Botoner from Coventry, and he sometimes used the surname Botoner.

He was educated at Oxford and became secretary to Sir John Fastolf. When Fastolf died in 1459, Worcester discovered that he had bequeathed him nothing, despite his being one of Fastolf's executors, and, with one of his colleagues Sir William Yelverton, Worcester disputed the validity of the will. However, an amicable arrangement was made and Worcester obtained some lands near Norwich and in Southwark in London. He died about 1482.

== Writings ==
Worcester made several journeys through England, and his notes (now known as his "Itineraries") contain much information. His survey of Bristol, which he appears to have devised as a self-contained work, is particularly detailed, and of great value to historians and antiquaries. Portions of his notes were printed by James Nasmith in 1778; and his 1480 survey of Bristol was used by James Dallaway in William Wyrcestre Redivivus (William Worcester Reborn) in 1823. In 1834 Dallaway published Worcester's full itinerary of Bristol in Antiquities of Bristowe. Modern scholarly editions and translations have been published as the Itineraries of William Worcestre in 1969, edited by John Harvey; and as The Topography of Medieval Bristol in 2000, edited by Frances Neale.

The Boke of Noblesse, written some time in the 1450s, was produced in the wake of disastrous English losses in France and was later revised with the apparent intention of encouraging King Edward IV to renew his claim on the French throne.

Worcester was formerly thought to have written Annales rerum Anglicarum, a work of some value for the history of England under Henry VI. This was published by Thomas Hearne in 1728, and by Joseph Stevenson for the Rolls Series with his Letters and Papers illustrative of the Wars of the English in France during the Reign of Henry VI (1864). Stevenson also printed here collections of papers made by Worcester respecting the wars of the English in France and Normandy. In an essay published in 1957, K. B. McFarlane showed that Worcester only contributed two paragraphs to the Annales and that the rest of the work was put together by Hearne.

Worcester's other writings include the last Acta domini Johannis Fastolf. See the Paston Letters edited by James Gairdner (1904); and F. A. Gasquet, An Old English Bible and other Essays (1897).

== Modern editions ==
- Dallaway, James, ed. (1822). "Itinerarium, sive Liber Rerum Memorabilium Willemi Botoner dict. de Worcestre". Antiquities of Bristow in the Middle Centuries; including the topography by William Wyrcestre, and the life of William Canynges. Bristol: Mirror Office. pp. 15–166.
- Harvey, John, ed. (1969). Itineraries [of] William Worcester: edited from the unique MS Corpus Christi College, Cambridge, 210. Oxford Medieval Texts. Oxford: Clarendon Press. ISBN 0198222033.
- Nall, Catherine; Wakelin, Daniel, eds. (2023). William Worcester: The Boke of Noblesse and the English Texts from its Codicil. Early English Text Society OS. Vol. 362. Oxford: Oxford University Press. ISBN 9780198894513.
- Neale, Frances, ed. (2000). William Worcestre: The Topography of Medieval Bristol. Bristol Record Society. Vol. 51. Bristol: Bristol Record Society. ISBN 0901538213.

== Bibliography ==
- Dallaway, James (1823). William Wyrcestre Redivivus. Notices of Ancient Church Architecture in the Fifteenth Century, particularly in Bristol. With Hints for Practicable Restorations. Bristol: J. Norton.
- Dallaway, James (1834). Antiquities of Bristow in the Middle Centuries; including the topography by William Wyrcestre, and the life of William Canynges. Bristol: Mirror Office. pp. 15–166.
- McFarlane, K. B. (1957). "William Worcester: a preliminary survey". In Davies, J. Conway (ed.). Studies presented to Sir Hilary Jenkinson, C.B.E., LL.D, F.S.A. London: Oxford University Press. pp. 196–221.
- Orme, Nicholas (2006) [2004]. "Worcester [Botoner], William (1415–1480×85)". Oxford Dictionary of National Biography (online ed.). Oxford University Press. doi:10.1093/ref:odnb/29967. (Subscription, Wikipedia Library access or UK public library membership required.)
- Rundel, David."William Worcestre, Sir John Fastolf and Latin Learning." The Library 25 March 2024):3-28.

Attribution:
