= Margery Brews =

- Died: 1495
- Resting place: Whitefriars Church, Norwich, England
- Other names: Margery Brewes; Margery Paston; Margery Brews Paston
- Known for: Correspondence
- Spouse: John Paston III (m. 1477)
- Children: At least 3
- Parents: Thomas Brews (father); Elizabeth Debenham (mother)

Margery Paston (née Brews or Brewes; died 1495) was an English gentlewoman. She is credited with authoring the first known Valentine love letters in 1477 to her betrothed and future husband John Paston III, which survives in the Paston Letters.

== Biography ==
Some sources place her birth year in the 1440s and others in the 1450s. Noted for her wit, Margery was the daughter of Sir Thomas Brews or Brewes, of a rising gentry family, and Elizabeth Debenham. Her letters place her in Topcroft, Norfolk, scribed by Thomas Kela, a Brews family servant.

Margery met John Paston III, and the pair began an exchange of letters to one another. John had sought a wife for many years before happening upon Margery. However, their courtship was brought to a halt when Margery's father disapproved of the match as he wanted her to marry wealthier, while the Pastons desired higher than the Brews' dowry offer of no more than £100. Moreover, a further rift was caused by John not seeking permission from his older brother John Paston II to ask for Margery's hand. However, Margery's mother Elizabeth supported the match and began a correspondence with the Pastons. In letter dated circa 10 February 1477, Elizabeth wrote the following, inviting John III to negotiate in person:

Friday is St Valentine's Day, and every bird chooseth him a mate; and if it like you to come on Thursday at night and so purvey you that you may abide there til Monday, I trust to God that you shall so speak to my husband; and I shall pray that we shall bring the matter to a conclusion.

— Dame Elizabeth Brews (née Debenham), letter (translated to Modern English)

Here, Elizabeth links the Feast of Saint Valentine to romantic love. A couple centuries prior, Geoffrey Chaucer had written the poem Parlement of Foules, in which he describes birds seeking their mate on that day, believed to have been written amidst the marriage negotiations between Richard II and Anne of Bohemia. Elizabeth's letter appears to reference bird mating season as well.

After the weekend in question, Margery sent two further letters of note. She addresses John as "my right well-beloved Valentine" or "dearly beloved Valentine", and in the second, she signs off as "your Valentine". Margery's letters employ both romantic and practical persuasion, presenting herself as a worthy suitor.

The impasse was resolved, and two months later, John and Margery married. In later letters such as in 1484, Margery calls John her "sweetheart", writes of dreaming about him and desire to be held by him. This suggests Margery and John's affection did not wane, and that they enjoyed a loving marriage. The couple had at least three children: Christopher, believed to have died in childhood, William, and Elizabeth. In 2019, a brass plaque commemorating Anne (or Anna), another daughter of John's, was discovered in Oxnead. Through this, three further siblings of Anne's were discovered: sisters Dorothy and Philippa, and a brother Philip.

== Death ==
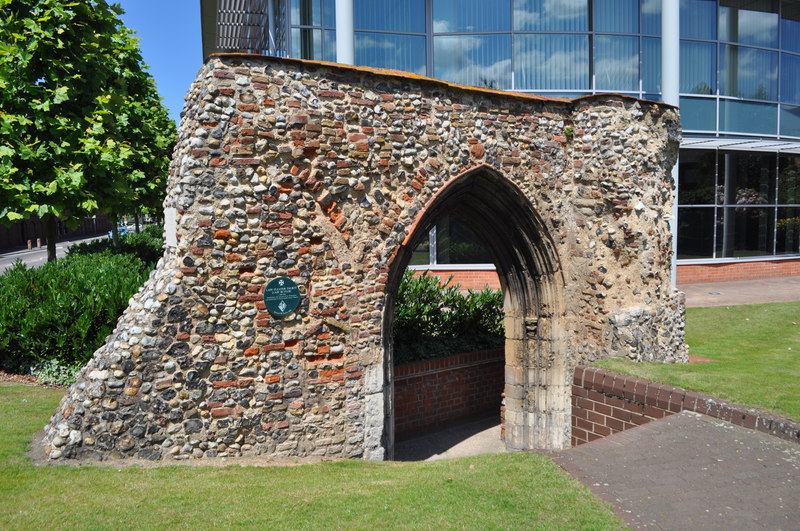
Ruins of Whitefriars

Margery died in 1495, survived by her husband. She was buried at Whitefriars in Norwich, a now-ruined Carmelite Friary near Whitefriars Bridge.
