= Hellesdon =

Village in Norfolk, England

Coordinates: 52.6485°N 1.2509°E

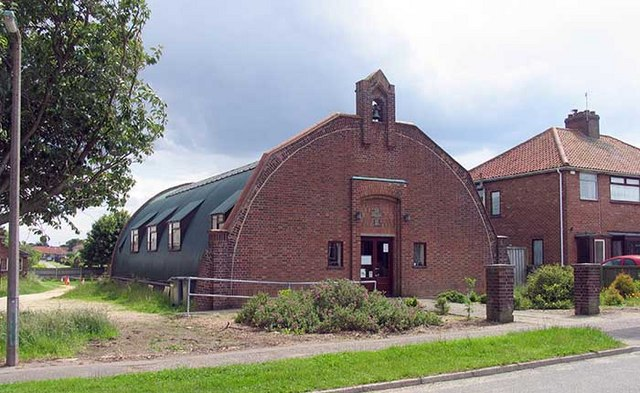
- St Paul's Church

- Location within Norfolk
- Area: 2.02 sq mi (5.2 km^{2})
- Population: 11,126 (2021 census)
  - Density: 5,508/sq mi (2,127/km^{2})
- OS grid reference: TG200105
- District: Broadland
- Shire county: Norfolk
- Region: East
- Country: England
- Sovereign state: United Kingdom
- Post town: NORWICH
- Postcode district: NR6
- Dialling code: 01603
- Police: Norfolk
- Fire: Norfolk
- Ambulance: East of England
- UK Parliament: Norwich North

Hellesdon is a village and civil parish in the district of Broadland in Norfolk, England.

Hellesdon is located four miles (6 km) north-west of Norwich and 9.6 miles (15.4 km) south of Aylsham.

== History ==
Hellesdon has signs of very early settlement. A variety of flint instruments have been unearthed in and around the suburb, thought to date back at least 4,000 years. A collection of bronze axe heads were found near Hellesdon Hall and a skeleton dating from around 600 AD was discovered next to Hellesdon Lodge, in Low Road.

Hellesdon's name is of Anglo-Saxon origin and derives from the Old English for the hill of Haegal. Hellesdon is recorded in tradition as the location where King Edmund was killed by Viking invaders in 869, although there is no consensus on the location of this event.

In the Domesday Book, Hellesdon is listed as a settlement of 29 households hundred of Taverham. In 1086, the village was part of the East Anglian estates of Godwin Healfdene.

A medieval stone cross stands in St. Mary's Churchyard to mark the boundary of the City of Norwich, the cross was restored in 1902.

Hellesdon was one of several manors owned in the fifteenth century by Sir John Fastolf, the original of Shakespeare's Falstaff, and as with other of his properties; his death in 1459 led to something close to a private war between the Paston family and John de la Pole, 2nd Duke of Suffolk for its possession.

In the 1880s, what became the Midland and Great Northern Joint Railway reached Hellesdon, linking the area with nearby Norwich and Melton Constable; the station closed in 1952 and the line followed in its fate in 1959.

In the Eighteenth Century, a workhouse was built in Hellesdon.

In 1915, Mann Egerton established an aircraft factory in Hellesdon which built Short Bombers and Sopwith Camels for the First World War. The factory closed in 1919 and was demolished in 1984.

During the Second World War, anti-tank and anti-aircraft defences were built in Hellesdon to defend Norwich against a possible German invasion.

From 1930 to 1964, motorcycle speedway team the Norwich Stars raced at the old Firs raceway. Ove Fundin was World Speedway Champion on a number of occasions in the early 1960s. The stadium was sold for housing in 1964, bringing the Norwich Stars speedway team to an end.

In 1959, a post was built for the Royal Observer Corps in the parish which was eventually closed in 1991.

A street in Hellesdon was named Prince Andrews Road in honour of Prince Andrew of Greece and Denmark. However, the street became associated with Andrew Mountbatten-Windsor, who was formerly known as Prince Andrew. Proposals have been made to rename the street due to Andrew's association with Jeffrey Epstein. However, such a change would require the unanimous approval of all 107 properties on the street and be paid for by the residents.

== Geography ==
According to the 2021 census, Hellesdon has a population of 11,126 people which shows an increase from the 10,957 people recorded in the 2011 census.

The A1067, between Fakenham and Norwich, passes through Hellesdon.

== St. Mary's Church ==
Hellesdon parish church is dedicated to Saint Mary and dates from the Fifteenth Century. St. Mary's is located on Low Road and has been Grade II listed since 1984. The church holds regular Sunday services.

St. Mary's was restored in the Victorian era and features a stained-glass window installed by A.L. Wilkinson to replace bomb damage from the Norwich Blitz.

Church services are also held at St. Paul's Church which is an iron Nissen Hut featuring a stained-glass window installed by William Morris.

== Amenities ==
Hellesdon has a number of small independent shops, along with some large retailers including a B&Q and a large Asda superstore, which was opened in 1983 and a filling station was added to the site in 1990.

There are six schools: one high, two junior and three infant schools. Hellesdon High School is an academy.

There is a library and a community centre for use by local clubs, such as Hellesdon Horticultural Association and the Hellesdon Community Choir. The local football team, Hellesdon FC, play at the community centre which also was used to hold the World Cycle speedway championships in 1987.

There are two pubs in Hellesdon: The Whiffler and The Bull (whose original name was restored in 2022 after local opposition to its brief renaming as The Chestnut Tree). Former pubs include The Man On The Moon, which is now Hellesdon's doctor's surgery; The Bignold Arms is now a fish restaurant and takeaway; The Firs became a Tesco Express; and The Falcon became a Co-op, but this closed in 2019 and the building is now an office location.

There are also several parks and green spaces although the golf course has been sold for further residential housing developments, potentially increasing the village's population significantly.

Hellesdon has a large psychiatric hospital, Hellesdon Hospital, but many of the former ward buildings are no longer occupied and the upper level of the site is destined to be sold for housing development. Situated next to the hospital is the East of England Ambulance Service's Norwich office, which includes its AOC (Ambulance Operations Centre), Hellesdon Response Post and a training centre, along with a vehicle workshop.

== Culture ==
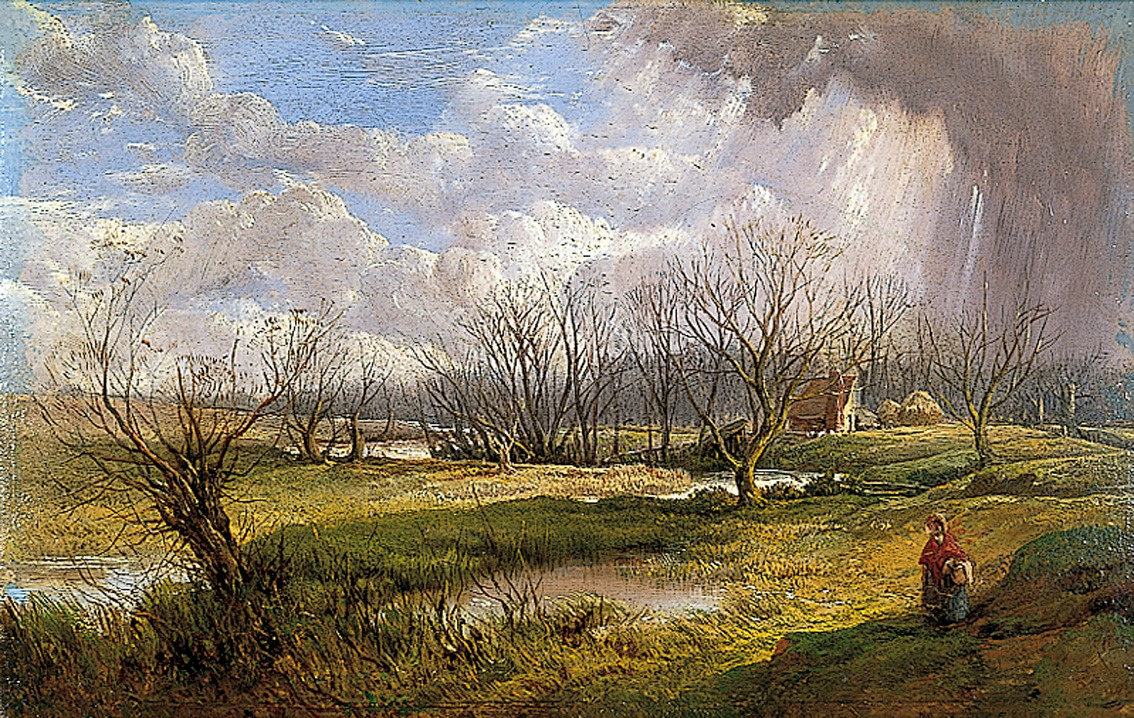
A Fine Day in February (Hellesdon) by John Middleton (Norfolk Museums Collections)

Hellesdon was one of the places in Norfolk depicted by the Norfolk School artist, John Middleton.

== Transport ==
Norwich International Airport is located adjacent to Hellesdon, providing flights to many destinations in the British Isles and Europe.

After the closure of Hellesdon railway station in 1952, the nearest National Rail station is Norwich; it provides direct trains to locations throughout East Anglia and to London, operated by Greater Anglia.

Bus services in the area are provided primarily by First Eastern Counties and Sanders Coaches; destinations include the city centre, Aylsham, Cromer, Fakenham, Mulbarton and Sheringham.

== Governance ==
Hellesdon is split into multiple electoral wards for local elections and is part of the district of Broadland.

The village's national constituency is Norwich North which has been represented by the Labour Party's Alice Macdonald MP since 2024.

== War Memorial ==
Hellesdon War Memorial is a wheel-headed granite cross in St. Mary's Churchyard. The memorial lists the following names for the First World War:

Rank	Name	Unit	Date of death	Burial/Commemoration
Capt.	Charles N. Wheeler	2nd Bn., South Lancashire Regt.	7 Jan. 1915	Menin Gate
Sjt.	William Roalfe	South Lancashire Regiment	21 Mar. 1916	Norwich Cemetery
LCpl.	Lamonia Frost	1st Bn., Essex Regiment	13 Aug. 1915	Helles Memorial
Dvr.	Leonard J. Durrant	2 Coy., Army Service Corps	9 Feb. 1915	Greenwich Cemetery
Pte.	Gordon V. Allen	1st Bn., Essex Regiment	12 Oct. 1916	Thiepval Memorial
Pte.	Dudley L. B. Copsey	2nd Bn., Essex Regt.	24 Apr. 1918	Loos Memorial
Pte.	Cecil G. Eastoll	17th Bn., Lancashire Fusiliers	17 Jul. 1918	Tyne Cot
Pte.	William J. Piercy	1st Bn., Norfolk Regiment	29 May 1918	Ploegsteert Memorial
Pte.	Leonard T. Pratt	2nd Bn., Norfolk Regt.	25 Dec. 1915	Amara War Cemetery
Pte.	Cecil S.S.B. Copsey	7th Bn., Norfolk Regt.	13 Oct. 1915	Loos Memorial
Pte.	Robert Frost	9th Bn., Norfolk Regt.	15 Sep. 1916	Thiepval Memorial
Pte.	Edward C. Stone	9th Bn., Norfolk Regt.	19 Sep. 1916	St. Pierre Cemetery
Pte.	Walter Fox	7th Bn., Queen's Royal Regiment	9 Nov. 1917	Étaples Military Cemetery
Smth	Percy W. Howes	25th Bde., Royal Field Artillery	2 Oct. 1918	Brie Cemetery
Spr.	Bertie Bloomfield	9th Coy., Royal Engineers	17 Jun. 1918	Mont-Bernanchon Cemetery

The following names were added after the Second World War:

Rank	Name	Unit	Date of death	Burial/Commemoration
FO	Russell H. Winter	No. 78 Squadron RAF	28 Jul. 1944	Sint-Joris Cemetery
FO	George Smith	Royal Air Force Volunteer Reserve	20 Dec. 1942	Runnymede Memorial
CA	Arthur C. Watson	HMS Penzance	24 Aug. 1940	Chatham Naval Memorial
WO	Kenneth W. Stone	No. 12 Squadron RAF	1 Feb. 1946	St. Mary's Churchyard
Sgt.	Stanley G. Webster	Royal Army Service Corps	8 Jul. 1942	Beirut Cemetery
Sgt.	Leslie C. Toghill	No. 49 Squadron RAF	12 Feb. 1942	Runnymede Memorial
Sgt.	Derrick B. Tuck	Royal Air Force Volunteer Reserve	25 Jun. 1945	Moascar War Cemetery
LSgt.	Walter S. Eastman	10th Bn., Highland Light Infantry	24 Mar. 1945	Reichswald Cemetery
LSA	Vernon I. Jarmy	HMS Peregrine	18 Nov. 1945	Sprowston Churchyard
LCpl.	Robert F. Forder	Royal Corps of Signals	15 Feb. 1944	Heliopolis War Cemetery
AS	John S. Yallop	HMS Kent	17 Sep. 1940	Chatham Naval Memorial
AS	Alfred H. Aldred	HMS Parthian	11 Aug. 1943	Chatham Naval Memorial
Dvr.	Clifford W. Harrell	Royal Army Service Corps	21 Nov. 1941	Alamein Memorial
Dvr.	Charles W. Woods	R.A.S.C.	14 Jan. 1944	Bari War Cemetery
Dvr.	Ronald G. Frosdick	288 Coy., Royal Engineers	7 Sep. 1944	Chungkai War Cemetery
Gnr.	Edward F. Cozens	113 Regt., Royal Artillery	1 Oct 1944	Coriano Ridge Cemetery
Pte.	Benjamin N. Nabarro	4th Bn., Essex Regiment	26 Jul. 1944	Arezzo War Cemetery
Pte.	Arthur A. Britcher	2nd Bn., Royal Norfolk Regiment	21 May 1940	Dunkirk Cemetery
Pte.	Ernest Lansdale	6th Bn., Royal Norfolks	14 Feb. 1942	Kranji War Memorial
Pte.	John E. Britcher	5th Bn., Queen's Royal Regiment	25 Oct. 1942	Alamein Memorial
Yeo.	Charles A. Wakefield	HMS President	15 Feb. 1942	Chatham Naval Memorial
