= Plumpton Correspondence =

Collection of 15th–16th century letters and writings

The Plumpton Correspondence is a rare collection of 250 letters and writings from 1461 to 1552 that have survived to the modern day. The writings contains day-to-day writings of William Plumpton and his family, revealing the daily lives of a medieval family of knightly status who held estates in the Knaresborough area of North Yorkshire.

The writings captured a time of decline in the military function of knighthood as well as the fortunes of the family during the Wars of the Roses, the letters also include numerous correspondence with lawyers on the complexities of the 15th and 16th century legal process. It is of particular value to social historians due to its subject matter.

It was preserved in a manuscript book of copies which passed into the hands of Christopher Towneley by about 1650, and remained among the Towneley manuscripts. It was edited for the Camden Society by Thomas Stapleton in 1838–1839 (under two volumes. The letters illustrated by the editor by extracts from a manuscript in the same collection, the Coucher Book of Sir Edward Plumpton.

== See also ==
- The Paston Letters
- Stonor Letters
