= William Yelverton =

Member of Parliament for Great Yarmouth, Norfolk (1400 – 1470)

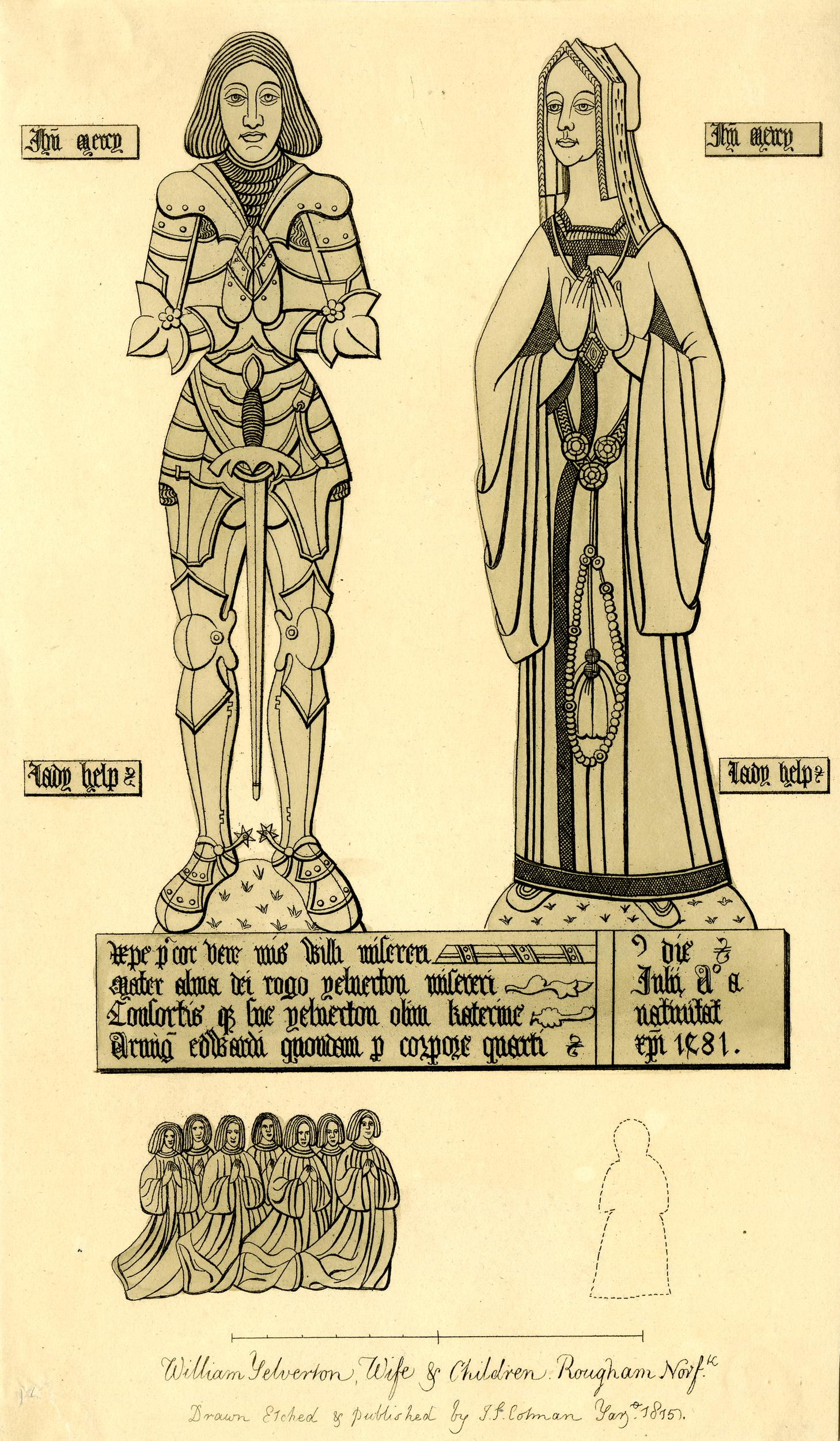
William Yelverton with his second wife Agnes Campe of Brentwood by John Sell Cotman

Sir William Yelverton KB (1400 – 1470s) was a judge in Norfolk, England and twice a member of parliament for Great Yarmouth, Norfolk.

== Biography ==
Yelverton was born in Norfolk to John Yelverton of Rackheath, Norfolk, and Elizabeth, the daughter of John Rede of Rougham.

Yelverton was a justice of the peace in Norwich in 1427 and recorder from 1433 to 1450. In 1435 and 1436, he was the member of parliament for Great Yarmouth and in 1439 he was made a sergeant-at-law. He was the under-steward of the Duchy of Lancaster, Norfolk and made judge of the king's bench in 1444.

In 1439, despite not being presiding justice, Yelverton intervened during the trial of rapist Thomas Elam, whose victim, Margaret Perman, died of her injuries. In front of the court he declared to remember the event of Margaret's death, lending weight to the prosecution, who won the guilty verdict.

In spite of some apparent reluctance to recognise the new king, he was continued in this office by Edward IV, who knighted him before September 1461. His name occurs in many judicial commissions in the early years of Edward's reign, and he was annually appointed justice of the peace for Norfolk and Suffolk.

Yelverton seems to have been capable of surviving the reigns of several monarchs and it was said of him that "This learned person seems to have stood equally well with the monarchs of both of the Roses, as we find him not only continued in his judicial office by King Edward IV, but made a Knight of the Bath, in order to grace that king's coronation; and upon the temporary restoration of King Henry [sic VI], appointed by patent, dated October 1470, one of the judges of the court of common pleas." John Burke from A general and heraldic dictionary of the peerages of England, Ireland and Scotland... OUP, 1831.

He died in either 1472 or 1477 and was buried in Rougham church. "The inscription on his tomb, printed by Weever, has no date. Rubbings of the monumental brasses to him and his second wife are found in the vestry of Rougham church. After his death his estate passed to his son William.

== Caister Castle and the Pastons ==
Yelverton was an executor and heir to the estate of Sir John Fastolf, a Norfolk knight who died in 1459. In his latter years Fastolf had taken counsel from John Paston, to whom he was related through Paston's wife, Margaret. Fastolf's will was disputed by Yelverton and the other executors once it was discovered that Paston was to inherit the estates. The dispute between Yelverton and Paston was taken up by the Lord Chancellor's office and went on for many years although most notable was the furore over Caister Castle which is written about in the Paston Letters. Other properties had been similarly fought for by Fastolf in previous years and Yelverton had played a part in securing at least one, Dedham manor, for him.

"In 1459 Sir John Fastolf [q. v.] had appointed Yelverton one of his executors, and he thus became involved in the prolonged disputes about the disposition of Fastolf's property; he generally acted in concert with William Worcester [q. v.] in opposition to the Pastons, and there is frequent mention of his name in the Paston Letters." John Burke from A general and heraldic dictionary of the peerages of England, Ireland and Scotland... OUP, 1831.

== See also ==
- John Fastolf
- Paston Letters
