= Topcroft =

Village in Norfolk, England

Coordinates: 52.48884°N 1.3354°E

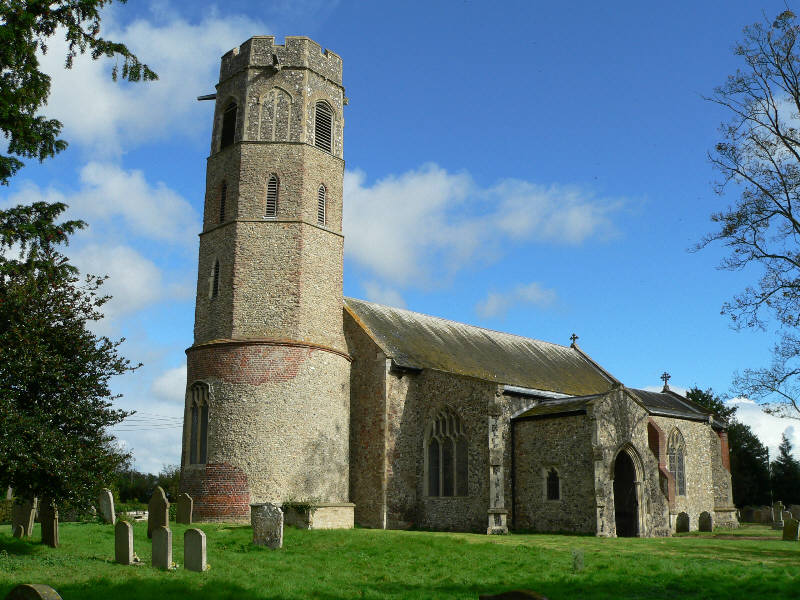
- The parish church of Saint Margaret, Topcroft, Norfolk

- Location within Norfolk
- Area: 7.76 km^{2} (3.00 sq mi)
- Population: 268 (parish, 2001 census)
  - Density: 35/km^{2} (91/sq mi)
- OS grid reference: TM260920
  - London: 119 miles (192 km)
- Civil parish: Topcroft CP
- District: South Norfolk
- Shire county: Norfolk
- Region: East
- Country: England
- Sovereign state: United Kingdom
- Post town: BUNGAY
- Postcode district: NR35
- Dialling code: 01508
- Police: Norfolk
- Fire: Norfolk
- Ambulance: East of England

Topcroft is a village and a civil parish in the English county of Norfolk. The village is around 7 miles (11 km) north-west of Bungay and 14 miles (23 km) south of Norwich in the South Norfolk district. The village lies close to the B1527 road.

The villages name means 'Topi's small enclosed field'.

The parish had a population of 265 at the 2011 census. A notable resident of Topcroft is the artist Hannah Giffard, creator of Pablo the Little Red Fox, an animated television series for children.

== History ==
Topcroft has an entry in the Domesday Book of 1085. In the great book Topcroft is recorded by the name Topercroft and Topercropt and was part of the holdings of Eudo FitzSpirwic, Berenger from Saint Edmund's.

The population peaked in the 1851 census at 477 people, falling to a low of 257 in 1931 and staying stable at this level since then.

During World War II RAF Hardwick was built just to the south-west of the parish boundary. The airfield was operated by Bombardment groups of the US Eighth Air Force during the war and closed in 1945.

== The church of Saint Margaret ==
The parish church is dedicated to Saint Margaret. It is one of 124 existing round-tower churches in Norfolk.

== Culture and community ==
Topcroft Cricket Club is based in the village with the First XI playing in the Norfolk Cricket Alliance Division Two.

== Notable people ==
- Margery Brews, 15th-century gentlewoman and Valentine writer
