= Gilbert Debenham (died 1417) =

Gilbert Debenham (died 1417), of Alburgh, Norfolk and Great Wenham and Little Wenham, Suffolk, was an English Member of Parliament (MP).

He was a Member of the Parliament of England for Suffolk in 1402. He was the Sheriff of Norfolk and Suffolk 11 November 1394 – 9 November 1395.
