= John de Mowbray, 4th Duke of Norfolk =

English nobleman (1444–1476)

John de Mowbray
- Duke of Norfolk; Earl Marshal; Earl of Surrey
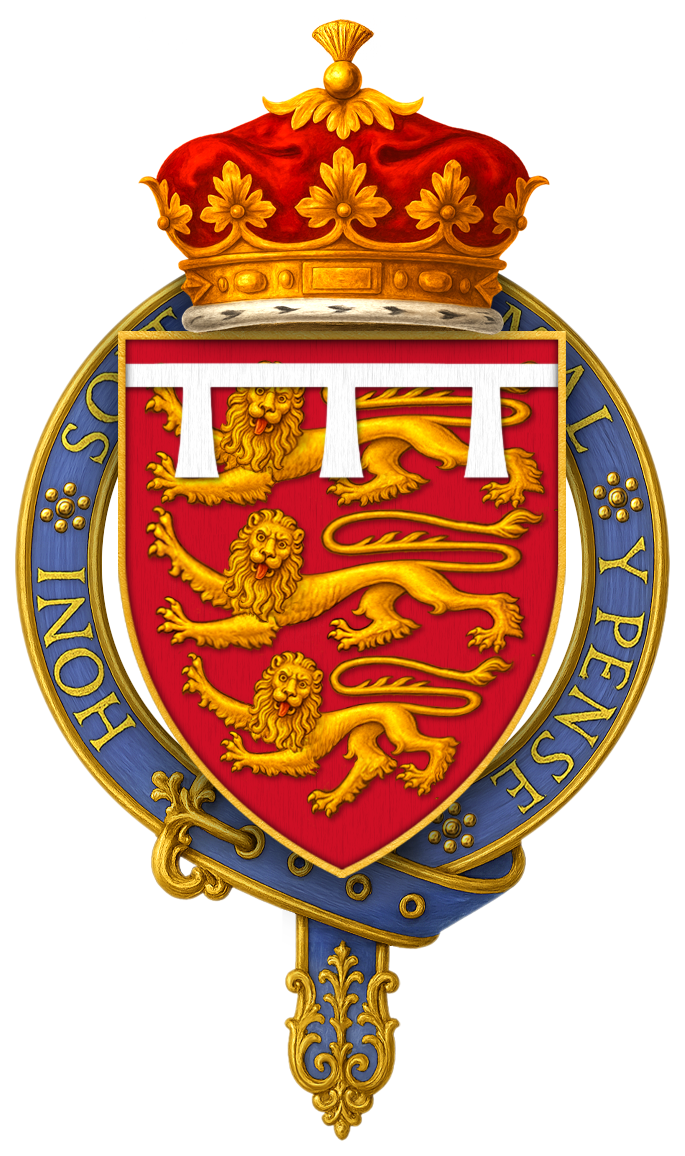
- Arms of John de Mowbray, 4th Duke of Norfolk, KG
- Born: 18 October 1444
- Died: 14 January 1476 (aged 31)
- Noble family: Mowbray
- Spouse: Elizabeth Talbot
- Issue: Anne de Mowbray, Countess of Norfolk
- Father: John Mowbray, 3rd Duke of Norfolk
- Mother: Eleanor Bourchier

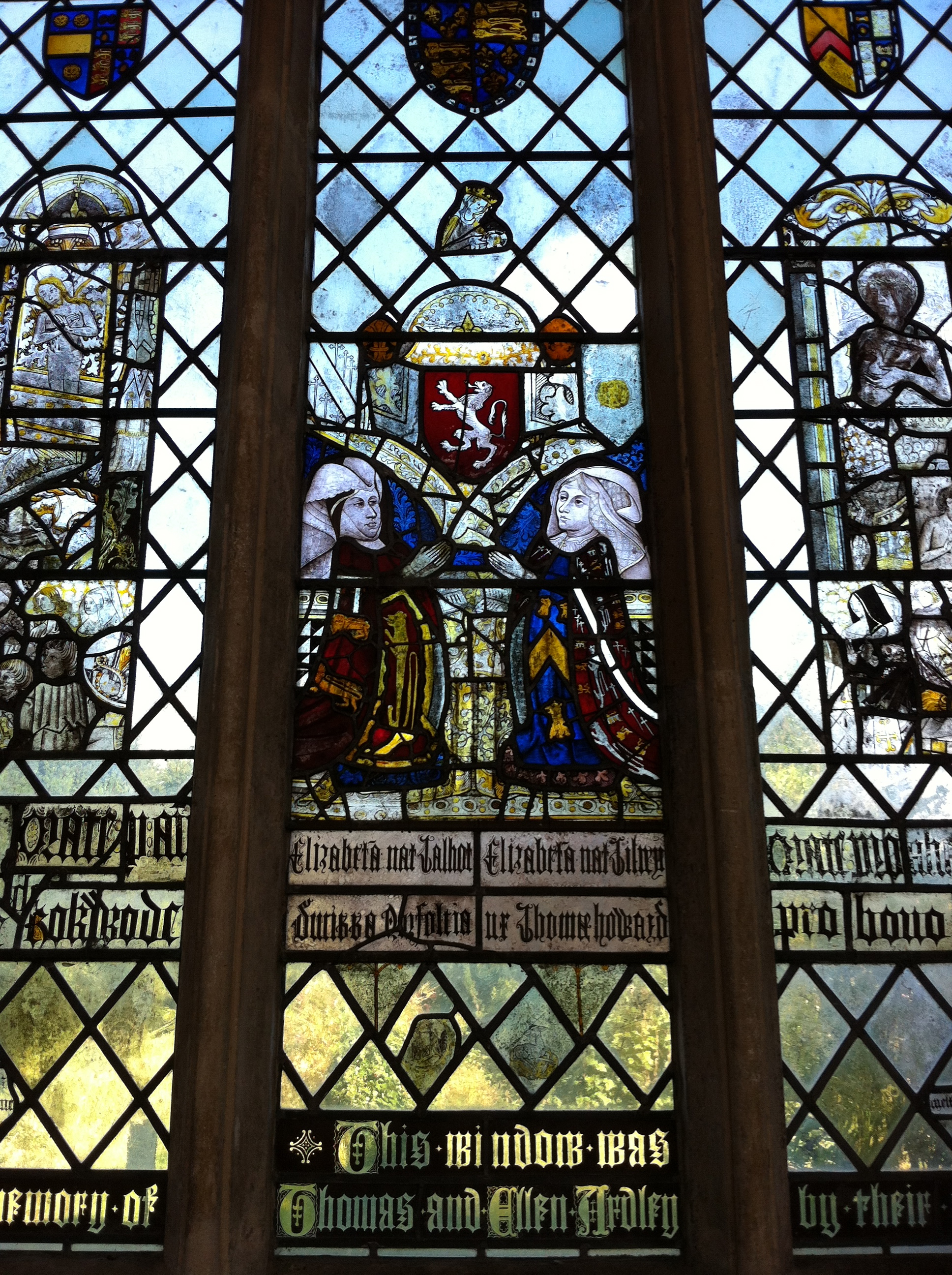
Left: Lady Elizabeth Talbot, wife of John de Mowbray, 4th Duke of Norfolk (1444–1476). On her kirtle she displays her paternal arms Gules, a lion rampant or a bordure engrailed of the last (Talbot) and on her mantle shows Gules three lions passant guardant or a label of three points argent (Brotherton, for Thomas of Brotherton, 1st Earl of Norfolk, a younger son of King Edward I and ancestor of the Duke of Norfolk). Below is inscribed in Latin: Elizabeta nat(a) Talbot Ducissa Norfoltia ("Elizabeth born Talbot, Duchess of Norfolk"). Stained glass in Holy Trinity Church, Long Melford, Suffolk

John de Mowbray, 4th Duke of Norfolk, KG (18 October 1444 – 14 January 1476), known as 1st Earl of Surrey between 1451 and 1461, was the only son of John de Mowbray, 3rd Duke of Norfolk and Eleanor Bourchier. His maternal grandparents were William Bourchier, Count of Eu and Anne of Gloucester.

In 1451 the earldom of Surrey was revived for him. Mowbray was descended from a sister of the last earl of the previous creation.

In 1461 he succeeded his father as 4th Duke of Norfolk and hereditary Earl Marshal. He continued his father's efforts to possess Caister Castle, finally taking it in September 1469 after a siege. John Paston had inherited Caister from John Fastolf in 1459 and was in charge of defending it. Although Paston had been in Mowbray's service for several years, Mowbray showed a notable ruthlessness in his conduct of the siege, in which one Daubenay, a long-standing Paston servant, was killed. Under pressure from the Church, Norfolk did at least grant the other defenders safe conduct. In 1476, within a day of Norfolk's death, the Paston family took Caister back again.

Norfolk was invested as a Knight of the Garter in 1472. He died very suddenly, having apparently been in good health the day before.

He married Elizabeth Talbot, daughter of John Talbot, 1st Earl of Shrewsbury and his second wife Lady Margaret Beauchamp. They had only one child, Anne de Mowbray, 8th Countess of Norfolk, and so the 1397 creation of the dukedom became extinct upon his death. Anne, who was only 3 years old when her father died, inherited the earldom and his extensive lands and wealth.

The dukedom would be recreated in 1481 and again in 1483. The 1483 creation survives to the present day, despite two periods of forfeiture.

== Family tree ==
Family tree of the Dukes of Norfolk; Earls of Arundel, East Anglia, Norfolk, Norwich, Nottingham, and Surrey; and Barons Mowbray, Segrave and Stourton

Earl of East Anglia (Earls of Norfolk and Suffolk) (1st creation), before 1069
Ralph the Staller c. 1011–1068; 1st Earl of Norfolk and Suffolk, or of the East Angles c. 1066/67–1068
Earl of Surrey (1st creation), c. 1088
Ralph de Gael c. 1040 – c. 1096; 2nd Earl of Norfolk and Suffolk, or of the East Angles until 1074	Roger Bigod of Norfolk d. 1107	William de Warenne c. 1035–1088; 1st Earl (of) Warenne / Earl of Surrey, Lord of Lewes, Seigneur de Varennes
Earldom forfeit, 1074
Earl of Norfolk (2nd creation), 1141
King Henry I c. 1068–1135	Maud Bigod	Hugh Bigod; 1095–1177; 1st Earl of Norfolk 1141–1177	William de Warenne d. 1138; 2nd Earl (of) Warenne / Earl of Surrey
Earl of Arundel, Earl of Sussex (1st creations), c. 1138
Empress Matilda c. 1102–1167	Geoffrey Plantagenet; 1113–1251; Count of Anjou	Adeliza of Louvain c. 1103–1151	William d'Aubigny c. 1109–1176; 1st Earl of Arundel, Earl of Sussex, Earl of Lincoln	William de Warenne; 1119–1148; 3rd Earl of Surrey
King Henry II; 1133–1189	William d'Aubigny b. c. 1138/1150–1176; 2nd Earl of Arundel, Earl of Sussex	Roger Bigod c. 1144/1150–1221; 2nd Earl of Norfolk 1189–1221 (disputed 1177–1189	William of Blois c. 1137–1159	Isabel de Warenne c. 1130 – 1203; 4th Countess of Surrey suo jure	Hamelin de Warenne c. 1130–1202; Comte de Warenne / Earl of Surrey, jure uxoris
King John; 1166/1167–1216	William d'Aubigny before 1180–1221; 3rd Earl of Arundel, Earl of Sussex	Hugh Bigod; 1186–1225; 3rd Earl of Norfolk 1221–1225	Maud Marshal; 1192–1248	William de Warenne c. 1160s/1170s–1240 5th Earl of Surrey
William d'Aubigny c. 1203–before 1224; 4th Earl of Arundel, Earl of Sussex	Hugh d'Aubigny d. 1243; 5th Earl of Arundel, Earl of Sussex	Isabel d'Aubigny	John Fitzalan; 1200–1240; 3rd Lord of Clun and Oswestry	Roger Bigod c. 1209–1270; 4th Earl of Norfolk 1233–1270	Hugh Bigod c. 1211–1266
King Henry III; 1207–1272	John Fitzalan; 1223–1267; 6th Earl of Arundel, Earl of Sussex, jure matris	John de Warenne; 1231–1304; 6th Earl of Surrey
Baron Segrave of Se(a)grave, 1283
Nicholas Segrave c. 1238–bef. 1295; 1st Baron Segrave	King Edward I 1239–1307	Edmund Crouchback; 1245–1296; Earl of Lancaster	John Fitzalan; 1246–1272; 7th Earl of Arundel, Earl of Sussex, jure matris	Roger Bigod c. 1245–1306; 5th Earl of Norfolk 1270–1306
Earldom extinct, 1270
Baron Mowbray, 1283	Earl of Arundel (2nd (1st by writ) creation), 1289
John Segrave c. 1256–1325; 2nd Baron Segrave	Roger de Mowbray; 1254–1297; 1st Baron Mowbray	Richard Fitzalan; 1267–1302; 1st (or 6th) Earl of Arundel	William de Warenne; 1256–1286
Earl of Norfolk (3rd creation), 1312
Stephen Segrave d. 1325; 3rd Baron Segrave	Thomas of Brotherton; 1300–1338; 1st Earl of Norfolk 1312–1338	John Mowbray; 1286–1322; 2nd Baron Mowbray	Henry c. 1281–1345; Earl of Leicester and Lancaster	Edmund Fitzalan; 1286–1326; 2nd (or 7th) Earl of Arundel	Alice de Warenne; 1287–1388 heir apparent to the Earldom of Surrey	John de Warenne; 1286–1347; 7th Earl of Surrey
Earldom of Arundel (2nd creation) forfeit, 1326
Earldom of Arundel (2nd creation) restored, 1331
John Segrave; 1315–1353; 4th Baron Segrave	Margaret of Brotherton; 1320–1399; 2nd Countess of Norfolk 1338–1399, Duchess of Norfolk "for life" 1397–1399	John Mowbray; 1310–1361; 3rd Baron Mowbray	Joan of Lancaster c. 1312–1349	Eleanor of Lancaster; 1318–1372	Richard FitzAlan c. 1313–1376; 3rd (or 8th) Earl of Arundel, 8th Earl of Surrey
Baron Arundel, 1377
Elizabeth de Segrave; 1338–1368; 5th Baroness Segrave	John de Mowbray; 1340–1368; 4th Baron Mowbray	Richard FitzAlan; 1346–1397; 4th (or 9th) Earl of Arundel, 9th Earl of Surrey	John FitzAlan c. 1348–1379; 1st Baron Arundel	Alice FitzAlan
Earldom of Arundel (2nd creation) forfeit, 1397
Earl of Nottingham (1st creation), 1377	Earl of Nottingham (2nd creation), 1383; Duke of Norfolk (1st creation), 1397	Duke of Surrey, 1397
John de Mowbray; 1365–1383; 1st Earl of Nottingham, 6th Baron Segrave, 5th Baron Mowbray	Thomas de Mowbray; 1366–1399; 1st Duke of Norfolk 1397–1399, 3rd Earl of Norfolk 1399, 7th Baron Segrave, 6th Baron Mowbray	Elizabeth Fitzalan; 1366–1425	John FitzAlan; 1364–1390; 2nd Baron Arundel	Thomas Holland; 1372–1400; Duke of Surrey, 3rd Earl of Kent, 4th Baron Holland
Earldom of Nottingham extinct, 1383	Titles forfeit, 1399	Dukedom of Surrey extinct, 1400
Baron Stourton, 1448	Duke of Norfolk (1st creation restored), 1425	Earldom of Arundel (2nd creation) restored, 1400
John Stourton; 1400–1462; 1st Baron Stourton, 1448–1462	Thomas de Mowbray; 1385–1405; 4th Earl of Norfolk, 8th Baron Segrave, 7th Baron Mowbray 1399–1405	John de Mowbray; 1392–1432; 2nd Duke of Norfolk 1425–1432, 5th Earl of Norfolk, 9th Baron Segrave, 8th Baron Mowbray 1405–1432	Margaret de Mowbray c. 1388–1459	Robert Howard; 1385–1436	Isabel de Mowbray c. 1400–1452	Thomas FitzAlan; 1381–1415; 5th (or 10th) Earl of Arundel, 10th Earl of Surrey	John Fitzalan; 1385–1421; 6th (or 11th) Earl of Arundel, 3rd Baron Arundel, 3rd Baron Maltravers
Duke of Norfolk (4th creation), 1483
William Stourton before 1426–1478; 2nd Baron Stourton, 1462–1478	John de Mowbray; 1415–1461; 3rd Duke of Norfolk, 6th Earl of Norfolk, 10th Baron Segrave, 9th Baron Mowbray 1432–1461	John Howard; 1425–1485; 1st Duke of Norfolk, 13th Baron Segrave, 12th Baron Mowbray 1483–1485	John Fitzalan; 1408–1435; 7th (or 12th) Earl of Arundel, 4th Baron Arundel, 4th Baron Maltravers	William Fitzalan; 1417–1487; 9th (or 14th) Earl of Arundel, 6th Baron Arundel, 6th Baron Maltravers
Titles forfeit, 1485
Earl of Surrey (2nd creation), 1451	Duke of Norfolk (4th creation) restored and Earl of Surrey, 1514
John Stourton c. 1454–1485; 3rd Baron Stourton, 1479–1485	William Stourton c. 1457–1524; 5th Baron Stourton, 1487–1524	John de Mowbray; 1444–1476; 4th Duke of Norfolk, 7th Earl of Norfolk, Earl of Surrey, 11th Baron Segrave, 10th Baron Mowbray 1461–1476	King Edward IV; 1442–1483	Thomas Howard; 1443–1524; 2nd Duke of Norfolk, 1st Earl of Surrey 1514–1524	Humfrey Fitzalan; 1429–1438; 8th (or 13th) Earl of Arundel, 5th Baron Arundel, 5th Baron Maltravers	Thomas Fitzalan; 1450–1524; 10th (or 15th) Earl of Arundel, 7th Baron Arundel, 7th Baron Maltravers
Dukedom of Norfolk, Earldom of Nottingham, Earldom of Surrey extinct, 1476
Duke of Norfolk (3rd creation), Earl of Nottingham (3rd creation), and Earl of Surrey, 1477
Francis Stourton; 1485–1487; 4th Baron Stourton, 1485–1487	Edward Stourton; 1463–1535; 6th Baron Stourton, 1524–1535	Anne de Mowbray; 1472–1481; 8th Countess of Norfolk, 12th Baroness Segrave, 11th Baroness Mowbray 1476–1481	Richard of Shrewsbury; 1473–1483; Duke of York, Duke of Norfolk, Earl of Nottingham, Earl of Warenne 1477–1483	Anne of York; 1475–1511	Thomas Howard; 1473–1554; 3rd Duke of Norfolk, 2nd Earl of Surrey 1524–1554	Edmund Howard c. 1478–1539	Elizabeth Boleyn c. 1480–1538	William Fitzalan; 1476–1544; 11th (or 16th) Earl of Arundel, 8th Baron Arundel, 8th Baron Maltravers
Earldom of Norfolk extinct and Baronies Segrave and Mowbray in abeyance, 1481	Dukedom of Norfolk, Earldom of Nottingham, Earldom of Surrey extinct, 1483	Attainted, 1547; Restored, 1553
William Stourton c. 1505–1548; 7th Baron Stourton	Earl of Nottingham (5th creation), 1525	King Henry VIII; 1491–1547	Anne Boleyn c. 1501 or 1507–1536
Viscount Howard of Bindon, 1559
Charles Stourton c. 1520–1557; 8th Baron Stourton	Henry Howard; 1517–1547 styled Earl of Surrey	Thomas Howard c. 1520–1582; 1st Viscount Howard of Bindon	Mary FitzRoy; 1519–1557	Henry FitzRoy; 1519–1536; Duke of Richmond and Somerset, Earl of Nottingham	Catherine Howard c. 1524–1542	Henry Fitzalan; 1512–1580; 12th (or 17th) Earl of Arundel, 9th Baron Arundel, 9th Baron Maltravers
Earldom of Nottingham extinct, 1536
Thomas Howard; 1536–1572; 4th Duke of Norfolk, 3rd Earl of Surrey, 13th Baron Mowbray 1554–1572	Henry Howard; 1540–1614; Earl of Northampton	Queen Elizabeth I 1533–1603	Mary FitzAlan; 1540–1557
Dukedom (3rd creation) forfeit, 1572
Earl of Arundel (3rd creation), 1580	Earl of Suffolk (4th creation), 1603
John Stourton; 1553–1588; 9th Baron Stourton	Edward Stourton c. 1555–1633; 10th Baron Stourton	Philip Howard; 1557–1595; 20th/13th/1st Earl of Arundel, styled Earl of Surrey	Thomas Howard; 1561–1626; Earl of Suffolk	Lord William Howard; 1563–1640
Earldom of Arundel and Barony of Mowbray attainted, 1589	see Earls, Marquesses, and Dukes of Suffolk family tree
Earl of Arundel (3rd creation) and Barony of Mowbray restored, 1604; Earl of Norfolk (5th creation), 1644
William Stourton c. 1594–1672; 11th Baron Stourton	Thomas Howard; 1585–1646; 21st/14th/2nd Earl of Arundel, 2nd/4th Earl of Surrey, 1st Earl of Norfolk, 14th Baron Mowbray 1644–1646	Philip
see Earls of Shrewsbury family tree
Edward Stourton; 1617–1644	Henry Frederick Howard; 1608–1652; 22nd/15th/3rd Earl of Arundel, 3rd/5th Earl of Surrey, 2nd Earl of Norfolk, 15th Baron Mowbray 1646–1652	Alethea Howard; 1585–1654; 17th Baroness Strange of Blackmere, 14th Baroness Talbot, 13th Baroness Furnivall	William Howard; 1614–1680; 1st Viscount Stafford	William
Duke of Norfolk (4th creation restored), 1660	Baron Howard of Castle Rising, 1669; Earl of Norwich (3rd creation), 1672
William Stourton d. 1685; 12th Baron Stourton	Thomas Howard; 1627–1677; 5th Duke of Norfolk, 21st/14th/2nd Earl of Arundel, 4th/6th Earl of Surrey, 16th Baron Mowbray 1660–1677; 18th Baron Strange of Blackmere, 15th Baron Talbot, 14th Baron Furnivall 1654–1677	Henry Howard; 1628–1684; 6th Duke of Norfolk, 22nd/15th/3rd Earl of Arundel, 5th/7th Earl of Surrey, 1st Earl of Norwich and Baron Howard of Castle Rising, 18th Baron Strange of Blackmere, 17th Baron Mowbray, 15th Baron Talbot, 14th Baron Furnivall 1672–1684	Hon. Charles Howard; 1630–1713	Col. Bernard Howard; 1641–1717	Charles Howard, 1st Earl of Carlisle Earls of Carlisle
Edward Stourton; 1665–1720; 13th Baron Stourton	Thomas Stourton; 1667–1744; 14th Baron Stourton	Charles Stourton; 1669–1739	Henry Howard; 1655–1701; 7th Duke of Norfolk, 22nd/15th/3rd Earl of Arundel, 5th/7th Earl of Surrey, 2nd Earl of Norwich and Baron Howard of Castle Rising, 18th Baron Mowbray, 19th Baron Strange of Blackmere, 15th Baron Talbot, 14th Baron Furnivall, 1684–1701	Lord Thomas Howard; 1662–1689	Henry Charles Howard d. 1720
Thomas Howard; 1683–1732; 8th Duke of Norfolk, 23rd/16th/4th Earl of Arundel, 6th/8th Earl of Surrey, 3rd Earl of Norwich and Baron Howard of Castle Rising, 18th Baron Strange of Blackmere, 15th Baron Talbot, 14th Baron Furnivall, 19th Baron Mowbray 1701–1732	Edward Howard; 1685–1777; 9th Duke of Norfolk, 24th/17th/5th Earl of Arundel, 7th/9th Earl of Surrey, 4th Earl of Norwich and Baron Howard of Castle Rising, 20th Baron Mowbray, 20th Baron Strange of Blackmere, 15th Baron Talbot, 14th Baron Furnivall 1732–1777	Philip Howard; 1688–1750	Bernard Howard; 1674–1735
Earldom of Norwich (3rd creation) and Barony of Howard of Castle Rising extinct and Baronies of Furnivall, Mowbray, Segrave, Strange of Blackmere, and Talbot abeyant, 1777
Charles Stourton; 1702–1753; 15th Baron Stourton	William Stourton; 1704–1781; 16th Baron Stourton	Winifred Howard; 1726–1753	Anne Howard; 1742–1787	Charles Howard; 1720–1786; 10th Duke of Norfolk, 25th/18th/6th Earl of Arundel, 8th/10th Earl of Surrey 1777–1786	Henry Howard; 1713–1787
Charles Philip Stourton; 1752–1816; 17th Baron Stourton	Charles Howard; 1746–1815; 11th Duke of Norfolk, 26th/19th/7th Earl of Arundel, 9th/11th Earl of Surrey 1786–1815
William Stourton; 1776–1846; 18th Baron Stourton	Bernard Howard; 1765–1842; 12th Duke of Norfolk, 27th/20th/8th Earl of Arundel, 10th/12th Earl of Surrey 1815–1842
Charles Stourton; 1802–1872; 19th Baron Stourton	Henry Howard; 1791–1856; 13th Duke of Norfolk, 28th/21st/9th Earl of Arundel, 11th/13th Earl of Surrey 1842–1856
Baron Mowbray and Baron Segrave abeayance restored, 1878	Baron Howard of Glossop
Alfred Joseph Stourton; 1829–1893; 24th Baron Segrave, 21st/23rd Baron Mowbray, 20th Baron Stourton	Henry Granville Fitzalan-Howard; 1815–1860; 14th Duke of Norfolk, 29th/22nd/10th Earl of Arundel, 12th/14th Earl of Surrey 1856–1860	Edward George Fitzalan-Howard; 1818–1883; 1st Baron Howard of Glossop
Charles Botolph Joseph Stourton; 1867–1936; 25th Baron Segrave, 22nd/24th Baron Mowbray, 21st Baron Stourton	Henry Fitzalan-Howard; 1847–1917; 15th Duke of Norfolk, 30th/23rd/11th Earl of Arundel, 13th/15th Earl of Surrey, Lord Maltravers, Earl of Arundel and Surrey 1860–1917	Francis Fitzalan-Howard; 1859–1924; 2nd Baron Howard of Glossop
William Marmaduke Stourton; 1895–1965; 26th Baron Segrave, 23rd/25th Baron Mowbray, 22nd Baron Stourton	Bernard Fitzalan-Howard; 1908–1975; 16th Duke of Norfolk, 31st/24th/12th Earl of Arundel, 14th/16th Earl of Surrey 1917–1975	Bernard Fitzalan-Howard; 1885–1972; 3rd Baron Howard of Glossop
Charles Edward Stourton; 1923–2006; 27th Baron Segrave, 24th/26th Baron Mowbray, 23rd Baron Stourton	Miles Fitzalan-Howard; 1915–2002; 17th Duke of Norfolk, 32nd/25th/13th Earl of Arundel, 15th/17th Earl of Surrey, 4th Baron Howard of Glossop 1975–2002
Edward William Stephen Stourton; 1953–2021; 28th Baron Segrave, 25th/27th Baron Mowbray, 24th Baron Stourton	Edward Fitzalan-Howard b. 1956; 18th Duke of Norfolk, 33rd/26th/14th Earl of Arundel, 16th/18th Earl of Surrey, 5th Baron Howard of Glossop from 2002
James Charles Peter Stourton b. 1991; 29th Baron Segrave, 26th/28th Baron Mowbray, 25th Baron Stourton	Henry Fitzalan-Howard b. 1987 styled Earl of Arundel and Surrey

Political offices
Preceded by The Duke of Norfolk	Earl Marshal; 1461–1476	Succeeded by Countess of Norfolk
Peerage of England
Extinct Title last held by Thomas FitzAlan	Earl of Surrey; 1451–1476	Extinct
Preceded by John Mowbray VI	Duke of Norfolk; Earl of Nottingham; 1461–1476	Extinct
Preceded by John Mowbray VI	Earl of Norfolk; Baron Mowbray; Baron Segrave; 1461–1476	Succeeded by Anne de Mowbray
