= Oral will =

An oral will (or nuncupative will) is a will that has been delivered orally (that is, in speech) to witnesses, as opposed to the usual form of wills, which is written and according to a proper format.

A minority of U.S. states (approximately 20 as of 2009), permit nuncupative wills under certain circumstances. Under most statutes, such wills can only be made during a person's "last sickness," must be witnessed by at least three persons, and reduced to writing by the witnesses within a specified amount of time after the testator's death. Some states also place limits on the types and value of property that can be bequeathed in this manner. A few U.S. states permit nuncupative wills made by military personnel on active duty. Under the law in England and Wales oral wills are permitted to military personnel and merchant seamen on duty (see law report below) and it is common practice in Commonwealth countries.

An analogy can be drawn to the concept of last donations (donatio mortis causa) established by Roman law and still in effect in England and Wales.
