= Caister Castle =

Castle in Norfolk, England

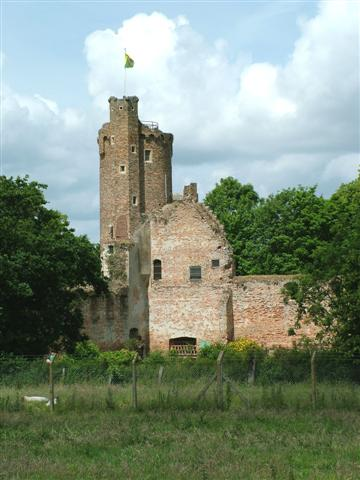
Caister Castle

Caister Castle is a 15th-century moated castle situated in the parish of West Caister, some 5 km (3.1 mi) north of the town of Great Yarmouth in the English county of Norfolk (grid reference TG504123).

The castle had a 100 ft (33 m) high tower and was built between 1432 and 1446 by Sir John Fastolf, who (along with Sir John Oldcastle) was an inspiration for William Shakespeare's Falstaff. The castle suffered severe damage in 1469 when it was besieged and captured by the Duke of Norfolk. The castle, other than the tower, fell into ruin after 1600 when a new house was built nearby.

The castle's tower is still intact and can be climbed by visitors.

== History ==
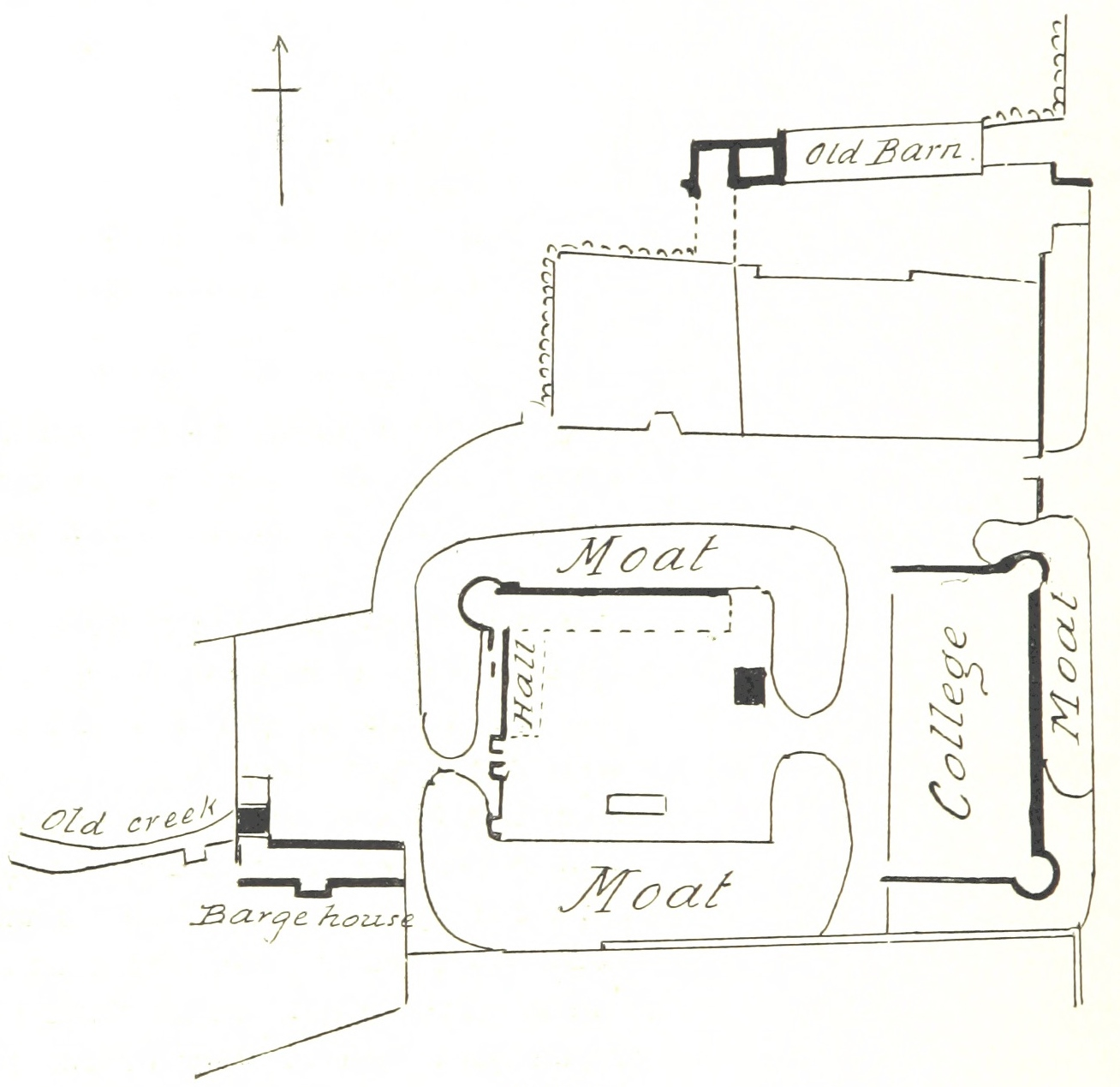
A plan of the castle from J. D. Mackenzie's The Castles of England: their story and structure

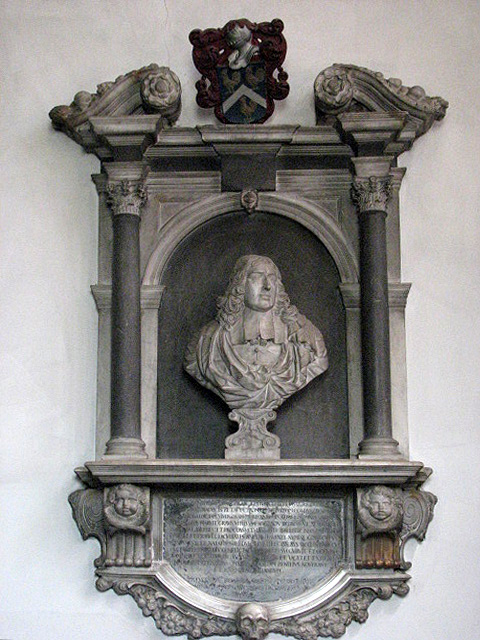
Mural monument of William Crow (d.1688), owner of the Castle from 1659. Holy Trinity Church, Caister-on-Sea

A detailed inventory was made of Sir John Fastolf's personal goods after his death in 1459. It includes silver plate, equipment for his chapel, the clothes and tapestry in his wardrobe at Caister, his armour, and the furnishings in several named rooms and chambers at Caister Castle.

Sir John Fastolf intended that the castle should be converted into an enormous chantry, to pray for his soul and that of his nearest and dearest; but as a result of various disputes about his will, it devolved instead to the Paston family, while the bulk of Fastolf's money went to endow Magdalen College in Oxford. Consequently, the castle features extensively in the 'Paston Letters', a unique collection of family correspondence covering the period of the Wars of the Roses, documenting the Paston family's struggles to climb and maintain position on the English social ladder. John Paston was a close confidant and advisor to Sir John Fastolf. Sir John died childless, and intestate; the castle was one of many properties in his estate. John Paston, with some justification, claimed to be his heir; this put him in direct conflict with various important figures of the time, such as the Duke of Norfolk and Sir William Yelverton.

As a result, the castle was besieged in August 1469 by the Duke – in pursuit of his own claim of ownership – and defended by John Paston junior and approximately 30 men. The two-month defence was unsuccessful, resulting in the death of one of the Paston's longest-serving servants by a crossbow wound, and the loss of the castle to the Duke. Some years later, the castle was returned to the Paston family's ownership. In 1659, the Pastons sold it to William Crow (d. 1688), an upholsterer and money lender of the City of London, whose inscribed mural monument survives in Holy Trinity Church, Caister-on-Sea, although the fine marble sculpted bust of Crowe was stolen in 2014.

Later, the Castle descended by marriage to the Bedingfield family. The Castle later suffered from neglect and the robbing of stonework and other fittings, including in about 1776 when Rev. David Collyer removed a newell staircase with 122 stone steps from the tower and incorporated in into his house at Wroxham. The inner moat was filled in between 1842 and 1893, and a lake was created by the widening of the south-eastern side. In 1952, the owner of the castle was Charles Hamblen-Thomas.

== Caister Castle Motor Museum ==
The Caister Castle Motor Museum was created in the 1960s in the south-west grounds of the Castle, and comprises a private collection of veteran, vintage, classic, sports and touring automobiles and motorcycles. The museum also displays bicycles, horse-drawn vehicles, pedal cars, agriculture equipment and transportation items. The exhibits are located in a purpose-built building. Admission to the castle includes the museum, castle tower and grounds.

== See also ==
- Paston, Norfolk
- Oxnead
