= John Fastolf =

15th-century English knight

Sir John Fastolf KG
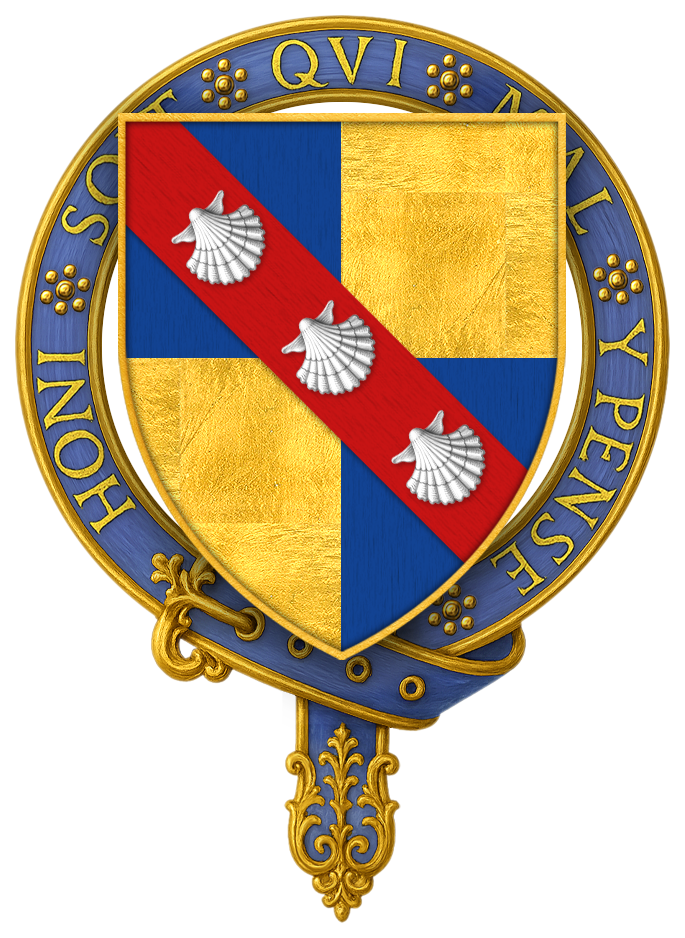
- Coat of arms
- Born: 6 November 1380; Caister Hall, Norfolk, England
- Died: 5 November 1459 (aged 78); Caister-on-Sea, Norfolk, England
- Burial place: Saint Benet's Abbey, the Broads, Norfolk, England
- Occupations: Soldier, landowner
- Era: Late Middle Ages
- Known for: Military service during the Hundred Years' War; Inspiration for William Shakespeare's Falstaff
- Spouse(s): Millicent (née Tibetot/Tiptoft), widow of Sir Stephen Scrope
- Relatives: John Paston (Note: In the Paston Letters, Paston's wife, Margery, calls Fastolf her kinsman. Both appear to be some form of relation to the Mortimer of Attleborough family. Fastolf's mother had married one of the family before he was born, as did a certain Margery Fastolf. The Mauteby family shares kinship with the Cliftons of Buckenham, who in turn are also related to the Mortimers of Attleborough.); Robert Harling (nephew)
- Awards: Knight Companion of the Most Noble Order of the Garter

Signature
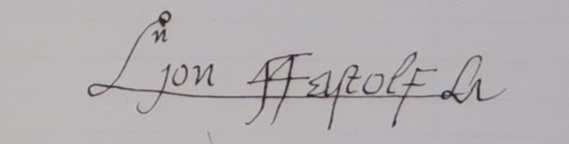

Sir John Fastolf (6 November 1380 – 5 November 1459) was a late medieval English soldier, landowner, and knight who fought in the Hundred Years' War from 1415 to 1439, latterly as a senior commander against Joan of Arc, among others. He has enjoyed a more lasting reputation as the prototype, in some part, of Shakespeare's character Sir John Falstaff, although their careers are very different. Many historians argue, however, that he deserves to be famous in his own right, not only as a soldier, but as a patron of literature, a writer on strategy and perhaps as an early industrialist.

== Lineage and family ==
Coming from a minor gentry family in Norfolk, John Fastolf was born on 6 November 1380 at the manor house of Caister Hall, a family possession which he later turned into Caister Castle, of which a tower and part of the curtain wall remains, as well as the partly filled in moat. The son of Sir John Fastolf (died 1383) and Mary Park (died 2 May 1406), he belonged to an ancient Norfolk family originally seated at Great Yarmouth, where it is recorded from the thirteenth century. Notable members of the family in earlier generations included Thomas Fastolf, Bishop of St David's, and his brother, Nicholas Fastolf, Lord Chief Justice of Ireland. Many of the name had been bailiffs of Great Yarmouth since the time of Edward I, and a certain Hugh Fastolf was sheriff of Norfolk in 1390.

On 13 January 1409, in Ireland, Fastolf married Millicent Tiptoft (1368–1446), daughter and co-heiress of Robert, Lord Tiptoft, and widow of Sir Stephen Scrope (son of Richard, Lord Scrope). This marriage brought him significant amounts of land, including the manors of Castle Combe and Bathampton in Wiltshire, Oxenton in Gloucestershire, and several properties in Somerset and Yorkshire. These lands brought him an income of £240 per annum, a considerable sum which amounted to five times the revenue Fastolf gained from his own estates. He settled an amount of £100 a year on his wife for her own use, but otherwise held her estates for himself until his death, at the expense of Millicent's son by her first marriage, Stephen Scrope (Fastolf's stepson). Fastolf's wife was significantly older than he was. The couple had no children.

Ancestors of John Fastolf

4. Alexander Fastolf
2. John Fastolf
5. Joan
1. John Fastolf
6. Nicholas Park
3. Mary Park

== Early years ==
According to Fastolf's biographer Stephen Cooper, given his family's background Fastolf must have received an appropriate education for the standards of the time. In a court testimony given in France, 1435, he claimed to have visited Jerusalem as a boy, between 1392 and 1393, which must have been in the company of Henry Bolingbroke, later Henry IV. Fastolf is said to have been squire to Thomas Mowbray, Duke of Norfolk, before the latter was banished in 1398.

Fastolf's whereabouts during the Lancastrian coup of 1399 (when Henry IV seized the crown from Richard II) are unknown, but in 1401 he entered the retinue of King Henry IV's second son, Thomas of Lancaster (later Duke of Clarence), under whose service he remained until 1415. Thomas had been appointed by his father to keep order in Ireland, and it was there that Fastolf first saw military action. Fastolf's commanding officer was Sir Stephen Scrope, whose widow he married after Scrope's death in 1408.

== Hundred Years' War ==
=== Early service in France ===
From 1415 to 1439, he was in northern France, where he served under Henry V and the king's brother, the Duke of Bedford. He took part in the siege of Harfleur in 1415, but was invalided home and so missed Agincourt, though he returned to defend Harfleur against the French attempt to recapture it in the winter of 1415–1416.

He was Bedford's Master of the Household, and was Governor of the province of Maine and Anjou, and on 25 February 1426, created a Knight Companion of the Most Noble Order of the Garter. Later in this year he was superseded in his command by John Talbot; and he became a somewhat controversial figure after the Siege of Orléans.

In 1421, during the English occupation of Paris, he became "governor" (effectively, the warden) of the Bastille, probably for a year.

After a visit to England in 1428, he returned to the war, and on 12 February 1429, when in charge of the convoy for the English army before Orléans, defeated the French and Scots at the Battle of the Herrings. In his biography of Fastolf The Real Falstaff (2010), Stephen Cooper relocates this battle from Rouvray-Saint-Denis to Rouvray-Sainte-Croix.

=== Encounters with Joan of Arc ===
During the 1429 Siege of Orléans, the French had planned to abandon the city after they heard rumours (which were true) that John Fastolf was coming with a force to reinforce the English besiegers. Jean de Dunois (known as "The Bastard of Orléans" as he was the illegitimate son of Louis I, Duke of Orléans) decided not to tell Joan of Arc and leave her out of leadership decisions, to which she famously responded:

Bastard, Bastard, in the name of God I command you that as soon as you hear of Fastolf's coming, you will let me know. For if he gets through without my knowing it, I swear to you that I will have your head cut off.

The French leader conceded to her, and she successfully lifted the siege.

She went on to take towns in the Loire Valley, including Jargeau on 12 June 1429, even though Fastolf had attempted to reinforce with troops and gunpowder weapons. After a result of this string of unexpected sudden defeats, Talbot and Fastolf resolved to confront the French in battle to put an end to their success, thus leading to the Battle of Patay on 18 June 1429. Joan was leading this army and was present in the battle, although how much of a role she had in it is disputed.

=== The Battle of Patay and Fastolf's reputation ===
Patay was a serious defeat for the English; 200–300 men were killed and over 2000 captured, including Talbot. Fastolf, however, escaped. According to the French historian Jehan de Waurin, who was present, the disaster was due to Talbot's rashness, and Fastolf only fled when resistance was hopeless. Other accounts charge him with cowardice, and it is true that John, Duke of Bedford, suspended him from the Order of the Garter and he was subject to accusations of cowardice from Talbot. Eventually, in 1442, an inquiry was convened by the Order of the Garter, probably at Fastolf's insistence. This found in Fastolf's favour and he was honourably reinstated to the order. This incident was unfavourably depicted by Shakespeare in Henry VI, Part 1 (act IV scene I). In all, it took Fastolf thirteen years to clear his name, and even then his reputation was still tainted.

=== Later career ===
Fastolf continued to serve with honour in France, and was trusted both by Bedford and by Richard of York. Despite the scandal associated with the Patay incident, he held a number of military commands, including captaincies of Honfleur (1424–34), Verneuil (1429), and Caen (1430–37).

In 1435, he drafted a document variously referred to as a report or memorandum proposing a new strategic approach to the war in France. In it, he criticizes current policy based on a war of sieges and proposes instead an offensive strategy based on large scale chevauchées. The document is a rare surviving example of military strategic thinking by a professional soldier of the Middle Ages.

He only came home finally in 1440, when past sixty years of age. But the scandal against him continued, and during Cade's rebellion in 1450 he was charged by the rebels with having been the cause of the English disasters through "diminishing the garrisons of Normandy".

== Property, investments, and inventory ==
Fastolf, like other English soldiers, profited from the wars in France by obtaining lands in the conquered territories. He was given Frileuse near Harfleur by Henry V and went on to build a considerable property portfolio in Normandy, including four manors in the Pays de Caux worth £200 per annum. Later, he became the Baron of Sillé-le-Guillaume and therefore a member of the peerage there, a position he never attained at home. But the instability of English rule cost him much in lost revenues. His Pays de Caux manors had an income of only £8 after the Norman revolt of 1435. He began in the 1430s to sell off his properties but he still in 1445 held properties in France worth £401, including 10 castles, 15 manors and an inn. All this was lost in the French reconquest.

From the 1430s he built Caister Castle in Norfolk as his main residence, with a London house in Bermondsey, then a popular location for the wealthy, just outside the city.

The usual detailed inventory made of Fastolf's personal goods after his death is one of relatively few non-royal examples to have survived from this period, in a transcription made by a later antiquary (the original is now lost). It includes large quantities of silver plate, equipment for his chapel, the clothes and tapestry in his wardrobe at Caister, his armour, and the furnishings of several rooms at Caister.

There were over a thousand ounces of "altar plate", plus some gold, in his home chapel. The Caister house had over 13,000 ounces of silver, as well as some gold, with 2,500 ounces at Bermondsey and a further 3,000 ounces deposited at a monastery of which he was a patron (a common practice). Most pieces were decorated, if only with heraldry, some of royal patrons and a dead friend. Some are mentioned as made in Paris ("6 Parys Cups of silver of the Months with no feet, the borders gilt"), and in some large pieces, such as salts, the elaborate structure is outlined.

== "Cruel and vengible he hath been ever…" ==
In the 1950s the Oxford academic K. B. McFarlane showed that Fastolf made large sums of money in France, which he managed to transfer back to England and invest in land and property. At the time, his reputation was mixed. One servant wrote of him: "cruel and vengible he hath been ever, and for the most part without pity and mercy" (Paston Letters, i. 389); and this remark has become famous because it was recorded in the letter. Besides his share in his wife's property he had large estates in Norfolk and Suffolk, a house at Southwark in London and where he also owned the Boar's Head Inn. The site of his house at Southwark, known as Fastolf Place or Palace, was excavated in the 1990s, but only a few pieces of revetment were found.

From 1435, and more so in retirement, he was the author of numerous memoranda, which he fired off to the government of the day, about the strategy and policy to be pursued with regard to the war in France. These were preserved by his secretary William Worcester and eventually published by the Reverend Joseph Stevenson in the nineteenth century. He also sat at the centre of an important literary circle, which produced manuscripts in French and English for him.

His last years were troubled by litigation and disputes regarding his East Anglian estates, in which he was helped by both John Paston, to whom he was related through Paston's wife, Margaret, and Sir William Yelverton, and by factional fighting at court which ultimately led to the so-called Wars of the Roses. Paston and Yelverton would go on to be two of the main protagonists in the battles over his property after his death. Fastolf was inclined to sympathise with Richard, Duke of York, whom he had known and served in France, but it would be an exaggeration to say that he ever became a "Yorkist".

He was a widower throughout the last decade of his life, when he lived at Southwark and Caister, and had no heir. He seems to have been a somewhat lonely figure, and made several attempts to draft a will, establishing a Chantry College at Caister Castle but never legally documented his intentions and effectively died intestate.

== Death and burial ==
He died at Caister on 5 November 1459. He was buried next to his wife Millicent in St Benet's Abbey in an aisle specially built at his expense on the south side of the abbey church, of which he had been a generous benefactor. During the last decade of his life he was a close political ally and friend of John Paston, who came to fame through the Paston Letters, a collection of over 1,000 items of correspondence between members of the Paston family.

Fastolf's deathbed testament naming John Paston as his executor and heir led to many years of litigation. The ruins of St Benet's Abbey may still be visited, as may the ruins of Caister Castle. The Castle never became home to a chantry, as Fastolf intended. Instead, after many legal disputes, and a brief siege by a rival claimant John de Mowbray, 4th Duke of Norfolk, it passed to the Paston family. The bulk of Sir John's fortune passed to Magdalen College, Oxford, where he is remembered as a benefactor, and where there is a Fastolf Society.

== Cultural portrayals ==
=== Shakespeare ===
Fastolf appears in Shakespeare's early play Henry VI, Part 1 as a cowardly knight who abandons the heroic Lord Talbot. In the first two folios, the name of the character is given as "Falstaffe" not Fastolf. When Shakespeare came to write Henry IV, Part 1, set in the early years of Fastolf's career, he created a disreputable boon companion for the young Prince Hal, who was called Sir John Oldcastle. The descendants of the real Oldcastle complained, so the name was changed to Sir John Falstaff, under which name he is identified in three later plays.

The tradition of Fastolf's braggart cowardice may have suggested the use of his name. Some writers have also suggested that Fastolf favoured Lollardy, which was also associated with Oldcastle, so this circumstance may have aided the adoption of the name. Stephen Cooper considers that there is in fact no evidence that Fastolf was a Lollard, and substantial indications that he was in fact Catholic like his one-time master Henry V.

Other points of resemblance between the historic Fastolf and the Falstaff of the dramatist are to be found in their service under Thomas Mowbray, and association with a Boar's Head Inn. But Falstaff is in no true sense a dramatisation of the real soldier, more an amalgam of a few real personages with a dash of creative licence. Indeed, the aged Falstaff dies early in the reign of Henry V, when Fastolf was midway through his career.

=== Later portrayals ===
Fastolf appears as a featured character in Koei's video game known as Bladestorm: The Hundred Years' War, in which he is seen as a contributor to the cause of England, wielding a longsword as his primary weapon.

He is the subject of a novel by Robert Nye entitled Falstaff (Publisher: Allison & Busby; New Ed edition (1 October 2001))

Fastolf is also an opponent in Ensemble Studios' Age of Empires II: The Age of Kings, in the game's Joan of Arc campaign. Fastolf fights on England's side and his unit is a lance-wielding knight.
