= Mautby =

Village in Norfolk, England

Coordinates: 52.65202°N 1.663742°E

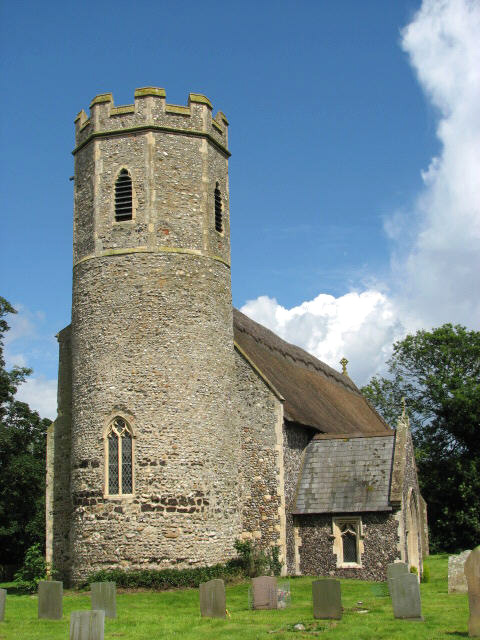
- SS Peter & Paul, Mautby

- Location within Norfolk
- Area: 16.60 km^{2} (6.41 sq mi)
- Population: 383 (2011)
  - Density: 23/km^{2} (60/sq mi)
- OS grid reference: TG 479 123
- Civil parish: Mautby
- District: Great Yarmouth
- Shire county: Norfolk
- Region: East
- Country: England
- Sovereign state: United Kingdom
- Post town: GREAT YARMOUTH
- Postcode district: NR29
- Police: Norfolk
- Fire: Norfolk
- Ambulance: East of England

Mautby is a village and civil parish in the county of Norfolk, England. The parish comprises a largely rural area along the north bank of the River Bure, and also includes the small villages of Runham and Thrigby. It is located some 6 mi (9.7 km) northwest of Great Yarmouth and 19 mi (31 km) east of Norwich.

In local dialect Mautby is pronounced "Morby". A windmill in Mautby has been converted to holiday accommodation.

== Geographical overview ==
The civil parish has an area of 16.6 km^{2} (6.4 sq mi) and in the 2001 census had a population of 395 in 145 households, the population reducing to 383 at the 2011 Census. For the purposes of local government, the parish falls within the district of Great Yarmouth.

The parish churches of Mautby and Runham are both dedicated to St Peter and St Paul; Thrigby's dedication is to St Mary. All three churches are Grade II* listed.
