= Letter (message) =

Written message from one to another

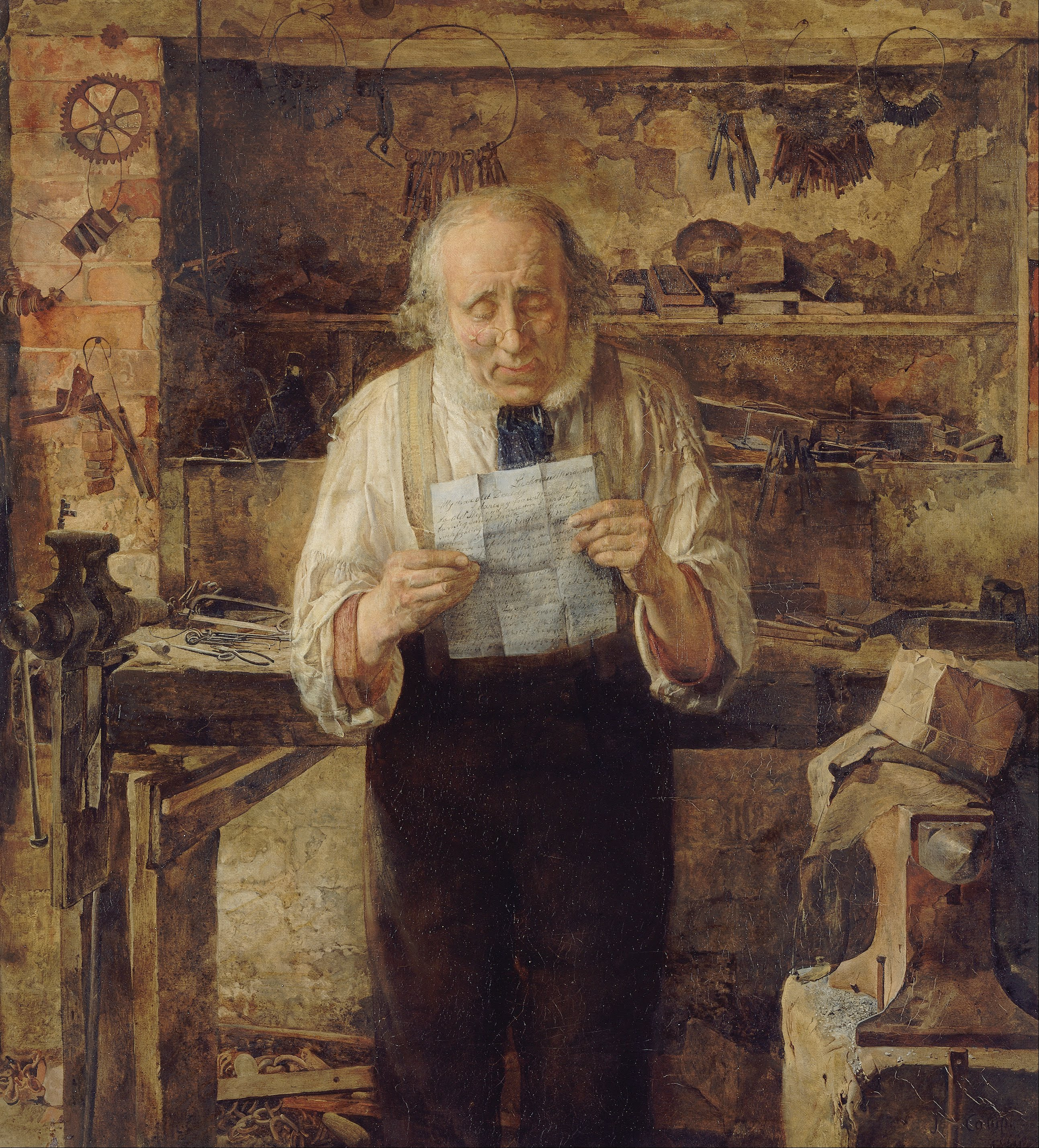
News from My Lad by James Campbell, 1828–1893 (Walker Art Gallery)

A letter is a written message conveyed from one person (or group of people) to another through a medium. The term usually excludes written material intended to be read in its original form by large numbers of people, such as newspapers and placards, although even these may include material in the form of an "open letter". The typical form of a letter for many centuries, and the archetypal concept even today, is a sheet (or several sheets) of paper that is sent to a correspondent through a postal system. A letter can be formal or informal, depending on its audience and purpose. Besides being a means of communication and a store of information, letter writing has played a role in the reproduction of writing as an art throughout history. Letters have been sent since antiquity and are mentioned in the Iliad. Historians Herodotus and Thucydides mention and use letters in their writings.

== History of letter writing ==
=== Ancient history ===
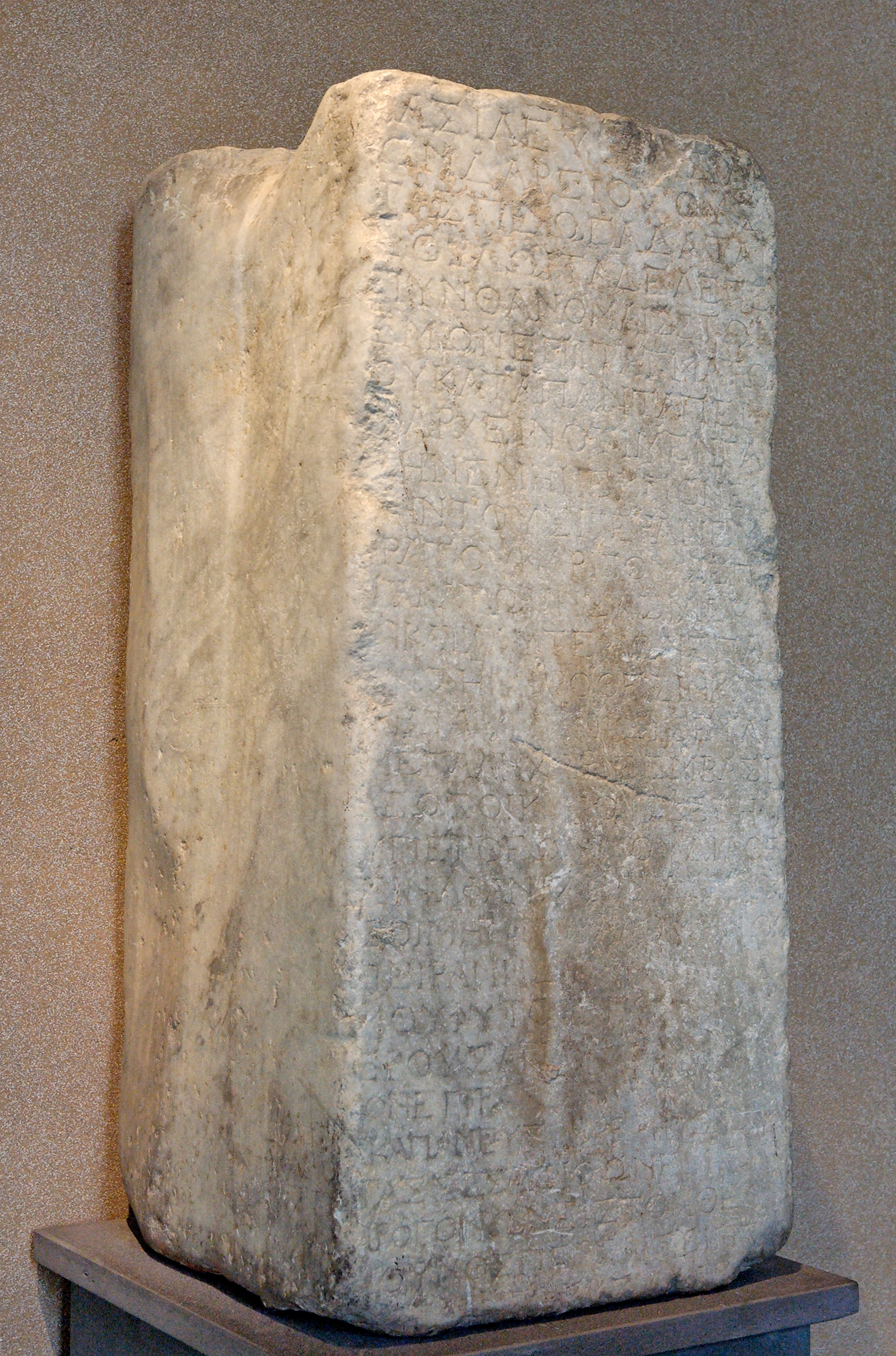
Letter of Darius the Great to Gadatas, circa 500 BC.

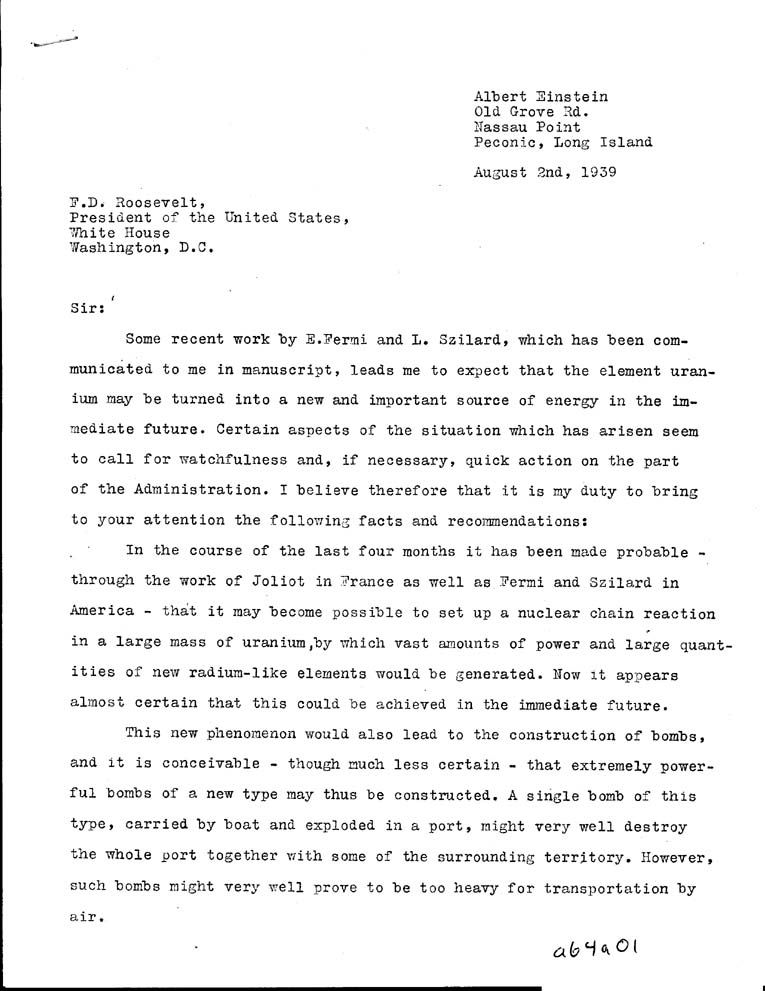
The Einstein letter from Edward Teller and Leó Szilárd to US President Franklin Roosevelt suggesting an atomic bomb project. Click here for page 2.

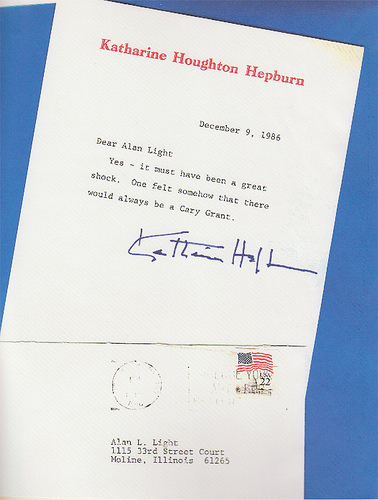
A thank-you letter from Katharine Hepburn to Alan Light thanking him for his condolences in regards of Cary Grant's death

Historically, letters have existed from ancient India, ancient Egypt and Sumer, through Rome, Greece and China, up to the present day. During the 17th and 18th centuries, letters were used to self-educate. The main purposes of letters were to send information, news and greetings. For some, letters were a way to practice critical reading, self-expressive writing, polemical writing and also exchange ideas with like-minded others. For some people, letters were seen as a written performance. Letters make up several of the books of the Bible. Archives of correspondence, whether for personal, diplomatic, or business reasons, serve as primary sources for historians. At certain times, the writing of letters was thought to be an art form and a genre of literature, for instance in Byzantine epistolography.

In the ancient world letters might be written on various different materials, including metal, lead, wax-coated wooden tablets, pottery fragments, animal skin, and papyrus. From Ovid, we learn that Acontius used an apple for his letter to Cydippe. More recently, letters have mainly been written on paper: handwritten and more recently typed.

=== Medieval history ===
Historians of the medieval period often study family letter collections, which gather the personal and business correspondence of a group of related people and shed light on their daily life. The Paston Letters (1425 – 1520 CE) are widely studied for insight into life in Britain during the Wars of the Roses. Other major medieval family letter collections include the Stonor Letters (1420 – 1483 CE), Plumpton letters (1416 – 1552 CE), and Cely Letters (1472-1488 CE).

=== 1700s ===
During the 1700s, called the "Great Age of Letter Writing", the epistolary novel became a hugely popular genre and came from the format of letters. The novel also debuted in the 1600s with Love-Letters Between a Nobleman and His Sister. Letter writers used this to communicate and explore their identity and daily life at the time. As a medium of writing that lies ambiguously between the public and private worlds, letters provide an appealing peek into other people's thoughts, feelings, and lives. During this historical period, publishing these "private" letters so they could build and preserve literary prominence became common for the first time. Just as social media streams now allow modern celebrities to present versions of their intimate lives for the public to see and read all about, so did early modern and 18th-century figures carefully build themselves in their letters for audiences to be excited to read these works of literature. In the 1700s, readers frequently associated personal letters with the ideals of honesty and truth.

Writing in the 1700s was a rough process that required a lot of materials, many of which were difficult or expensive to get. Researchers interested in the links and connections between migrants, settlers, and refugees have increasingly concentrated on letters and their purposes. Surprisingly, academics only began examining letters as artifacts in the late 1900s. Most studies continue to focus on the national course of epistolary novels.

Letters also offer information on changing conceptions of privacy, secrecy, and trust during a period of widespread censorship, especially in war. Lastly, study on letter writing and mail services culture exposes the economic and technical roots of letter writing, as well as how links required resources ranging from writing tables and ink to postal employees and ships to carry letters over the world. A lot of letters that were written in this time also showed up in a popular magazine called The Gentleman's Magazine. People were also charged for postage during this time. They either had to pay before or during transit. Writers took great caution in their number of pages so they did not have to pay so much. These writers were considered very clever in their way to avoid the overcharge.

Letter writing became an important pastime for many, particularly women. Writing letters provided women with an opportunity to express themselves, to share thoughts and ideas, as well as to build their own identity and voice in society. The popularity of letter writing was also reflected in literature, particularly through the epistolary novel. One of the well known examples from this period was Clarissa Harlowe, whose story is told largely through letters. Even after the epistolary novel's popularity was at the decline, letter writing remained an important form of communication. It gave many, especially women a voice when there were limited opportunities to express themselves.

Alexander Pope was the first English writer to publish from his own letters during his lifetime, putting out a new example for authors and other important people's epistolary works. Pope recognized that writings may reflect both personal religious devotion and cleverness. Pope's works are lacking in formality and informality. He had written his letters all about his life and what he did. Pope also wrote about his friends and the health and work of them. "All the pleasure of using familiar letters is to give us the assurance of a friend's welfare," Pope said. He had also taken to describing himself as "a mortal enemy and despiser of what they call fine letters." There was a letter addressed to Pope's father that ended up being used as writing paper for the Iliad. When Alexander Pope's letters were published, they were widely read by a number of people.

In the United States, letters experienced a boost in popularity after the Postal Act of 1845 decreased the price of sending letters and when paper started being made with wood pulp.

=== Letters as historical source material ===
Due to the timelessness and universality of letter writing, extant letters from earlier eras constitute an important category of source material in historiography (the methodology of historians).

There is a wealth of letters and instructional materials (for example, manuals, as in the medieval ars dictaminis) on letter writing throughout history. The study of letter writing usually involves both the study of rhetoric and grammar.

Letters were often subject to state censorship and confiscation. Private letters preserved in state archives tell not only what the author intended but also how the letter's purported content was interpreted by state officials. In some cases, the confiscation of letters led to increased censorship, like bans on correspondence and migration.

=== Declining use ===
Letters were a chief form of communication, in both personal and business communications, for many centuries before telegraphy, telephony, and Internet communications reduced their primacy. Even in times and places where literacy was lower, illiterate people could pay literate ones to write letters to, and to read letters from, distant correspondents. Even in the era of telegrams and telephones, letters remained quite important until fax and email further eroded their primacy, especially since the turn of the 21st century.

As communication technology has developed in recent history, posted letters on paper have become less important as a routine form of communication. For example, the development of the telegraph drastically shortened the time taken to send a communication, by sending it between distant points as an electrical signal. At the telegraph office closest to the destination, the signal was converted back into writing on paper and delivered to the recipient. The next step was the telex which avoided the need for local delivery. Then followed the fax (facsimile) machine: a letter could be transferred from the sender to the receiver through the telephone network as an image. These technologies did not displace physical letters as the primary route for communication. However today, the Internet, by means of email, plays the main role in written communications, together with text messages. These email communications are not generally referred to as letters but rather as e-mail (or email) messages, messages or simply emails or e-mails, with the term "letter" generally being reserved for communications on paper.

On March 6, 2025, PostNord announced that all letter mail deliveries will cease in Denmark by the end of 2025, citing a 90% decline in letter mail since 2000.

== Comparison with electronic mail ==
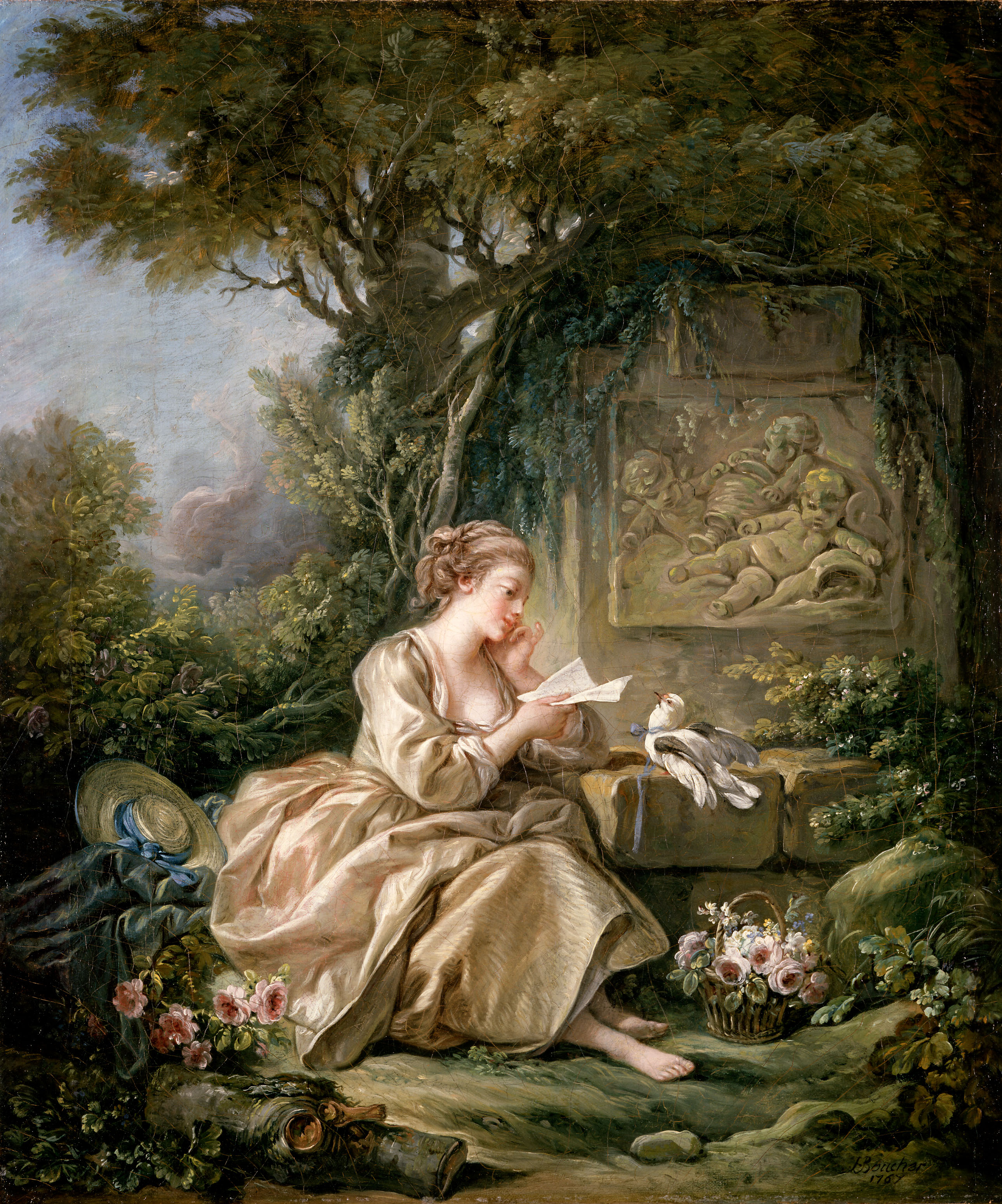
François Boucher – The Secret Message, 1767 (Herzog Anton Ulrich Museum)

Despite email's widespread use, letters are still popular, particularly in business and for official communications. At the same time, many "letters" are sent in electronic form. The following advantages of paper letters over e-mails and text messages are put forward:

- No special device is needed to receive a letter, just a postal address, and the letter can be read immediately on receipt.
- An e-mail may sit in a recipient's inbox for some time before being read, or may not be read at all; a paper letter is more likely to receive prompt attention once it arrives.
- An advertising mailing can reach every address in a particular area.
- A letter provides an immediate, and in principle permanent, physical record of communication, without the need for printing. Letters, especially those with a signature and/or on an organization's own notepaper, are more difficult to falsify than is an email, and thus provide much better evidence of the contents of the communication.
- A letter in the sender's own handwriting is more personal than an e-mail and shows that the sender has taken the effort to write it.
- If required, small physical objects can be enclosed in the envelope with the letter.
- Letters are unable to transmit malware or other harmful files that can be transmitted by e-mail.
- E-mails are insecure and may be intercepted en route. For this reason, letters are often preferred for confidential correspondence.
- Letter writing leads to the mastery of the technique of good writing.
- Letter writing can provide an extension of the face-to-face therapeutic encounter.
- Since at least a small fee is required, sending a large number of irrelevant letters becomes more expensive (and therefore less likely) than e-mail (spam).

The following advantages are put forward for e-mails and text messages over traditional letters:

- They can be transmitted instantly.
- They can be sent to a number of recipients in one operation.
- They do not require a postage fee.
- They do not require materials such as paper and ink.
- Often an e-mail would require a less formal style than a letter to the same recipient, and thus may take less time to write. It is also easier to make amendments to a draft than it is with a handwritten letter.
- E-mails may be composed using spell checkers and other devices, and thus may conceal the ignorance (inability to spell or compose prose etc.) of the sender.
- During an epidemic, e-mails cannot transmit diseases.
- Emails do not take up physical space and cannot be damaged in a natural disaster.

== Delivery process ==
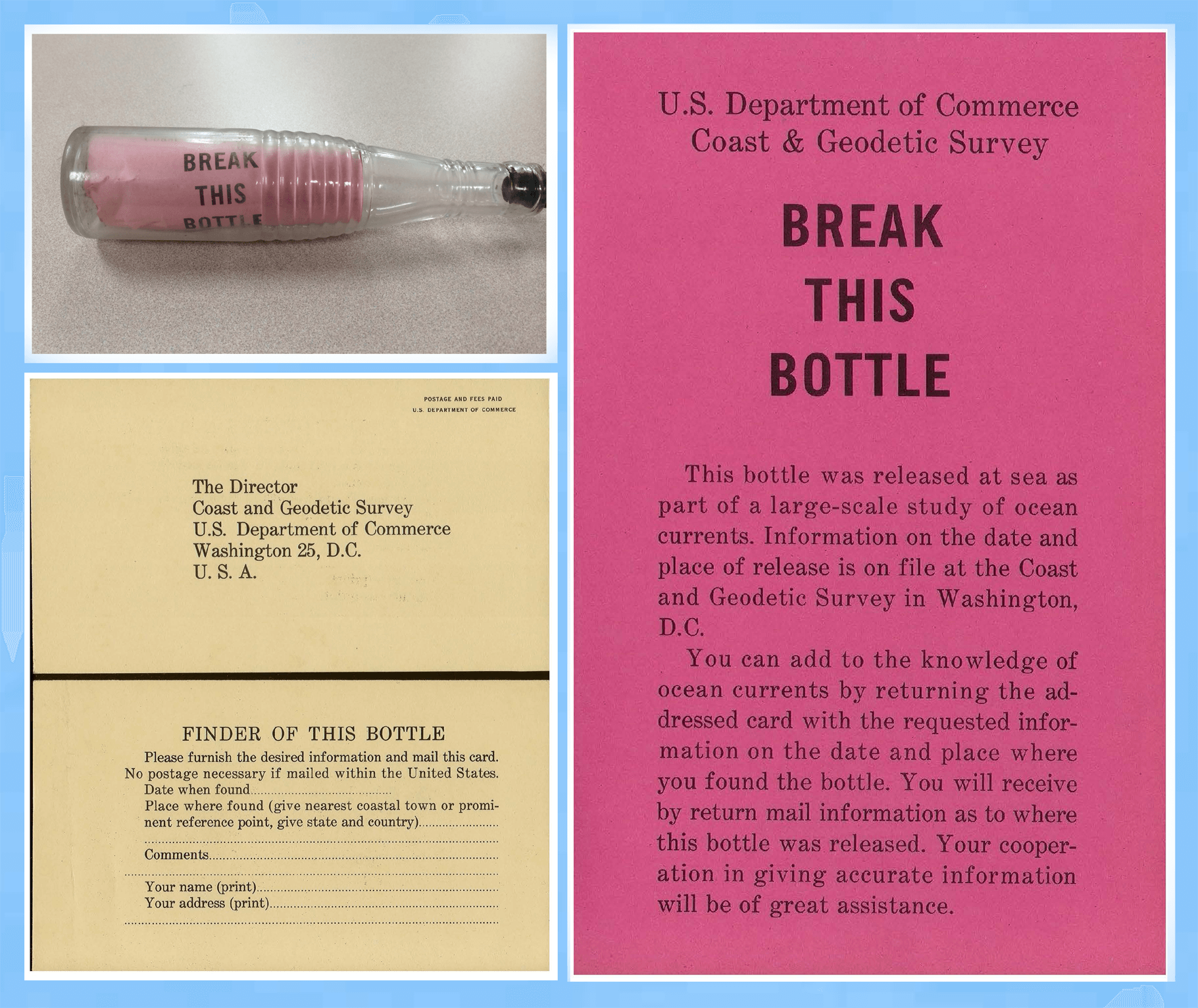
An unconventional delivery method is shown by this message in a bottle. This bottle and its contents (sample postcard and insert shown above) were launched into the Atlantic Ocean in 1959 by the United States Coast and Geodetic Survey and were found in 2013 at a beach on Martha's Vineyard.

Here is how a letter gets from the sender to the recipient:

1. Sender composes and writes letter and may fold the letter so that it fits in an envelope. For bulk mailings, a folding machine may be employed.
2. Sender places the letter in an envelope on which the recipient's address is written on the front of the envelope, or often is visible through a transparent window of the envelope. Sender ensures that the recipient's address includes the ZIP or Postal Code (if applicable) and historically often included their return address on the envelope.
3. For small volume private letters, the sender buys a postage stamp and attaches it to the top right corner on the front of the envelope. (For most commercial letters, postage stamps are not used: a franking machine or other methods are used to pay for postage.)
4. Sender puts the letter in a postbox.
5. The national postal service of the sender's country (e.g. Royal Mail, UK; USPS, United States; Australia Post in Australia; or Canada Post in Canada) empties the postbox and transports all the contents to the local sorting office.
6. The sorting office then sorts each letter by address and postcode and sends the letters destined for a particular area to that area's local sorting office (sometimes called a delivery office). Letters addressed to a different region may go through more than one stage of transmission and sorting.
7. The local delivery personnel collect the letters from the delivery office and deliver them to the proper addresses. In some areas, recipients may need to collect the letters from the local office.

This process, depending on how far the sender is from the recipient, can take anywhere from a day to 3–4 weeks. International mail is sent via trains and airplanes to other countries.

In 2008, Janet Barrett in the UK received an RSVP to a party invitation addressed to 'Percy Bateman', from 'Buffy', allegedly originally posted on 29 November 1919. It had taken 89 years to be delivered by the Royal Mail. However, Royal Mail denied this, saying that it would be impossible for a letter to have remained in their system for so long, as checks are carried out regularly. Instead, the letter dated 1919 may have "been a collector's item which was being sent in another envelope and somehow came free of the outer packaging".

== Forms of letters ==
The forms (conformations) of letters have usually followed traditional norms of the times and places where correspondence took place. Aspects such as where to place the elements (salutation, body of letter, valediction/closing, sender's address, recipient's address, date, and so on) were somewhat standardized albeit also usually flexible in practice. The form often varied by kind of letter. For any kind, though, factors of cost—such as that each sheet/leaf of paper cost money to buy and to post, and the fact of who paid for the posting (sender or recipient)—placed constraints on the forms of letters that varied from negligible in some times and places to crucial in others. These factors of cost drove norms on whether to write on both sides of the leaf, whether to cross the leaf with lines written in both directions (horizontally and vertically), whether to allow margins and how big or small to make them, how much to abbreviate to save space, and whether to have a separate envelope and thus how to fold the letter and where on the leaf to put the addresses.

Business encyclopedias and textbooks of the 19th and 20th centuries show that businesspeople of those eras sometimes took the standardization of the forms of business letters to extremes. Typists were required to follow dozens or hundreds of rules about element placement and sizing, some of them with rather arbitrary and even counterproductive (wastefully expensive) strictness. However, the effort to standardize (on where to put the information and how to represent it) did have various valid motivations, as in some respects it presaged the concept of data normalization, helping with the extensive manual indexing, cataloguing, and filing that characterized the clerking duties of the era.

Over the centuries, a lexicon of abbreviations, metonymic short forms, and conventional valedictions developed for frequent use in letters. For example, "yours of the 12th inst." meant "your letter of the 12th of this month"; "do" meant "ditto"; and forms like "Yr Obdt Srvt" for "Your Obedient Servant" were common.

== Kinds of letters ==
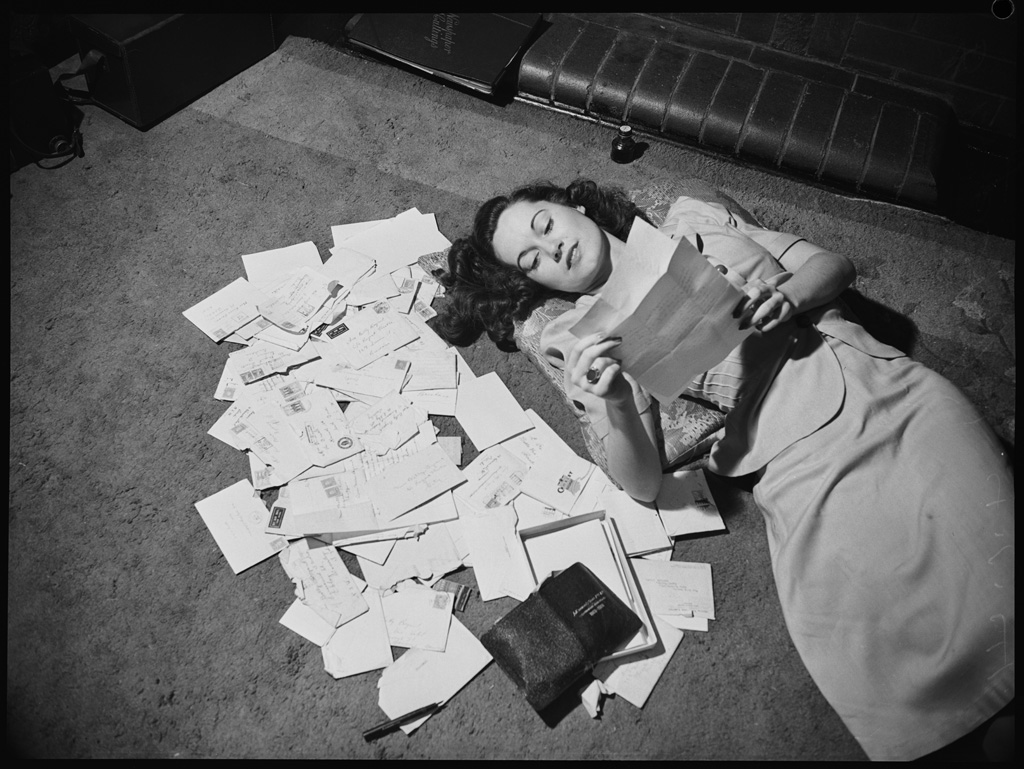
Australian actress Betty Bryant reading fan mail

There are a number of different types of letter:

- Audio letter
- Business letter
- Cease and desist letter
- Chain letter
- Cover letter
- Crossed letter
- Dear John letter
- Epistle
- Fan mail
- Form letter
- Hate mail
- Hybrid mail
- Letter of credence
- Letter of intent
- Letter of introduction
- Letter of marque
- Letter of recommendation
- Letter of resignation
- Letter of thanks
- Letter to the editor
- Letters patent
- Love letter
- National Letter of Intent
- Open letter
- Poison pen letter
- Query letter
- Sales letter
- Post-it notes

== Security methods ==
Cryptography (secret writing) sometimes played a role in letters in centuries past, as correspondents would use previously agreed code to try to shield the plaintext from the comprehension of prying eyes during the letter's transit. This could be done in business letters to lessen spying by competitors on prices and methods and in personal letters to try to evade postal censorship (either of wartime censors or of peacetime authoritarian censors) or the gossip of townsfolk. It could be in either cryptic form (for example, "AEDFX GHSTR HTFXV") or in deceptively readable form (for example, "the dog will run at sunset unless the rains come"). By the standards of modern digital applied cryptography, the security was often not especially high (that is, the codebreaking was not necessarily difficult), but it was usually high enough to meet the demands of the context (that is, the degree of risk, the likelihood or stakes of any codebreaking efforts, and the state of the codebreaking art in each era).

Various forms or precursors of tamper-evident technology were developed over the centuries to enable the sending and receiving of letters whereby it would be evident to the recipient if anyone else had opened the letter before they received it. The principal class of these methods was sealing wax. Another method was to apply a small thin disc of adhesive material known as a wafer. A more elaborate class was letterlocking, including a type called spiral locking, which was especially relevant to government ministers, royal courts, judicial courts, and legislators.

Envelopes are available in plain types as well as types with somewhat higher privacy protection in which a pattern of ink is printed on the inner side, making it more difficult for anyone trying to candle a sealed letter (that is, examine it translucently via backlight). Such envelopes are usually called privacy envelopes or security envelopes. Another sense of the term security envelope refers to security bags.

Diplomatic mail pouch systems are special, small, closed postal systems run by each country's ministry of foreign affairs or department of state. A general theme of the diplomatic mail pouch is that outsiders never have physical access to it during the entire chain of custody; it never gets sent off out of sight of authorized persons, which would otherwise be the weak link in the chain where intelligence agencies could surreptitiously examine it in non-evident ways. The mail pouch itself in a diplomatic mail pouch system is often a security bag instead of merely any cloth pouch or sack.

== Gallery ==
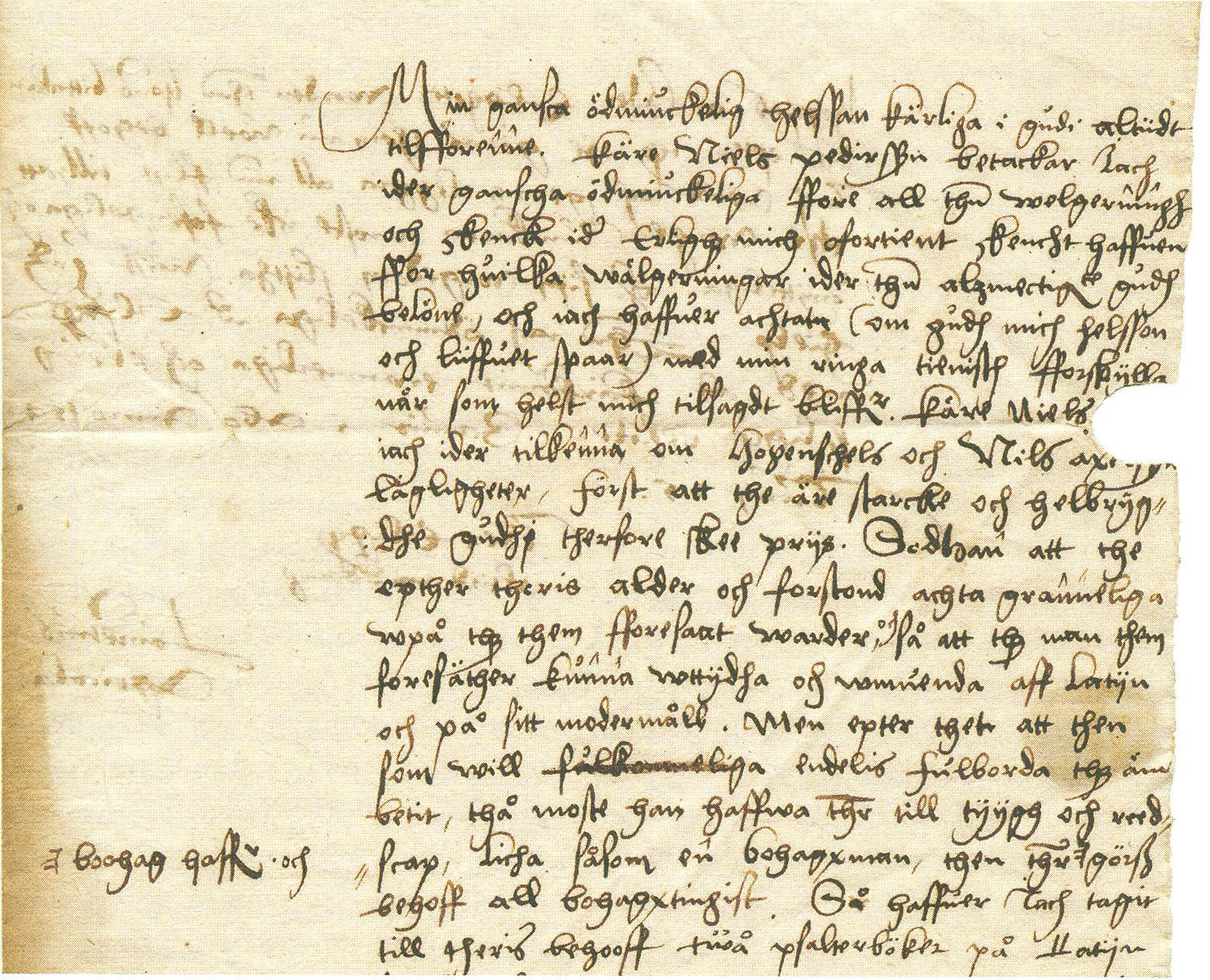
A hand-written letter (written in Swedish) from Mikael Agricola to Nils Turesson Bielke, 1549.

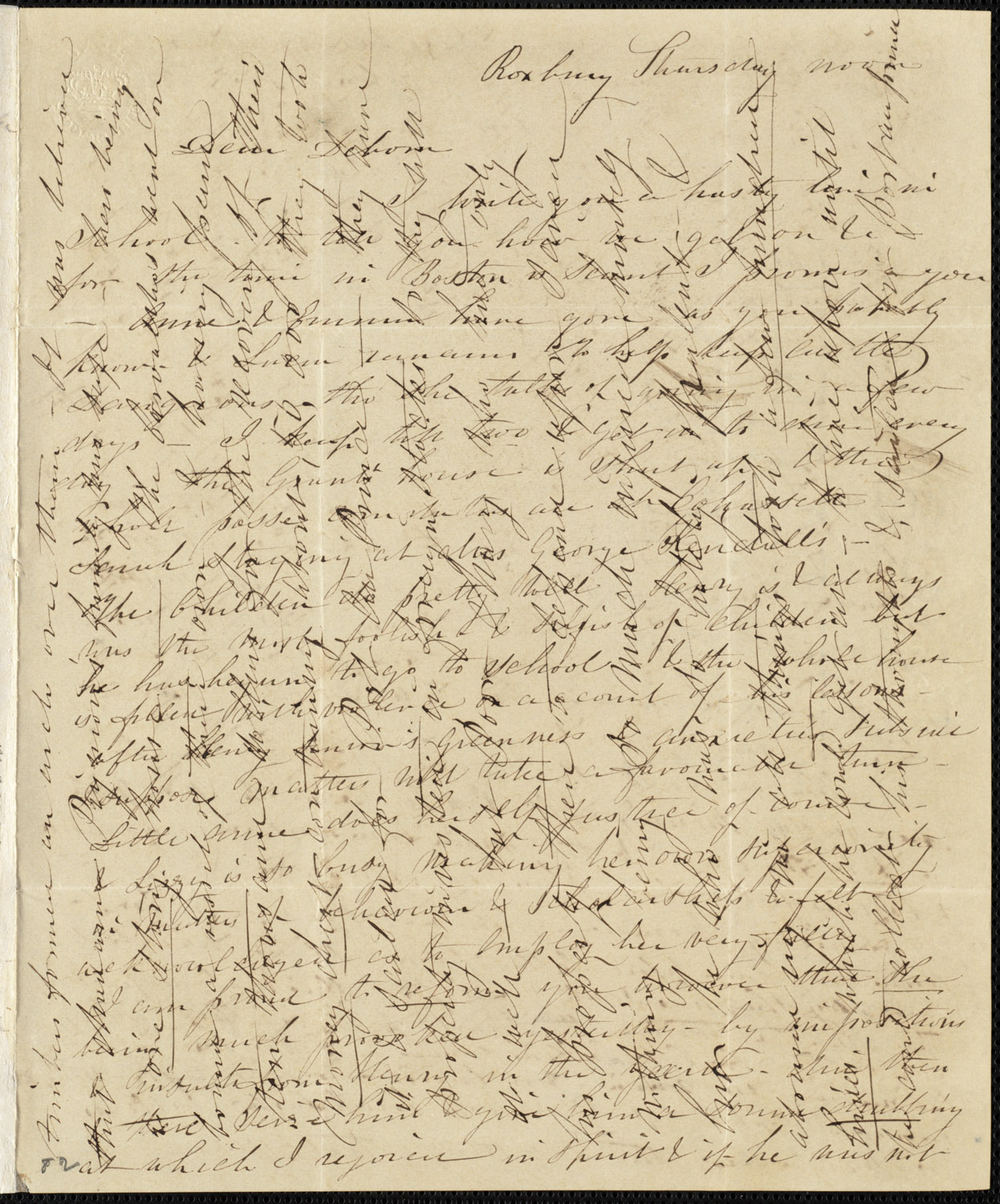
By writing both across and down, the sender of a letter could save on postage.

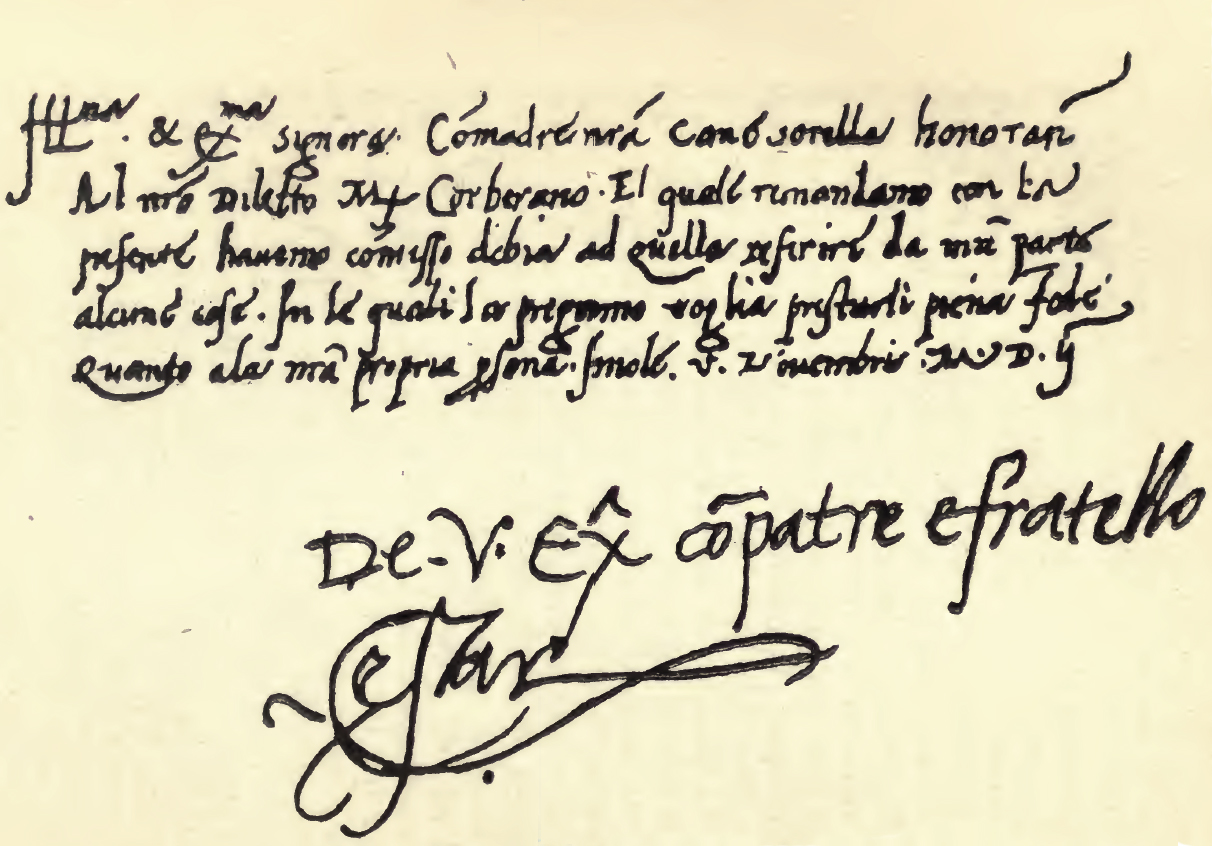
A hand-written letter of Cesare Borgia.

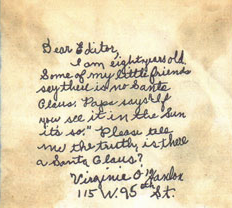
Virginia O'Hanlon's original 1897 letter which was answered by Francis Pharcellus Church in his newspaper editorial "Yes Virginia, there is a Santa Claus"

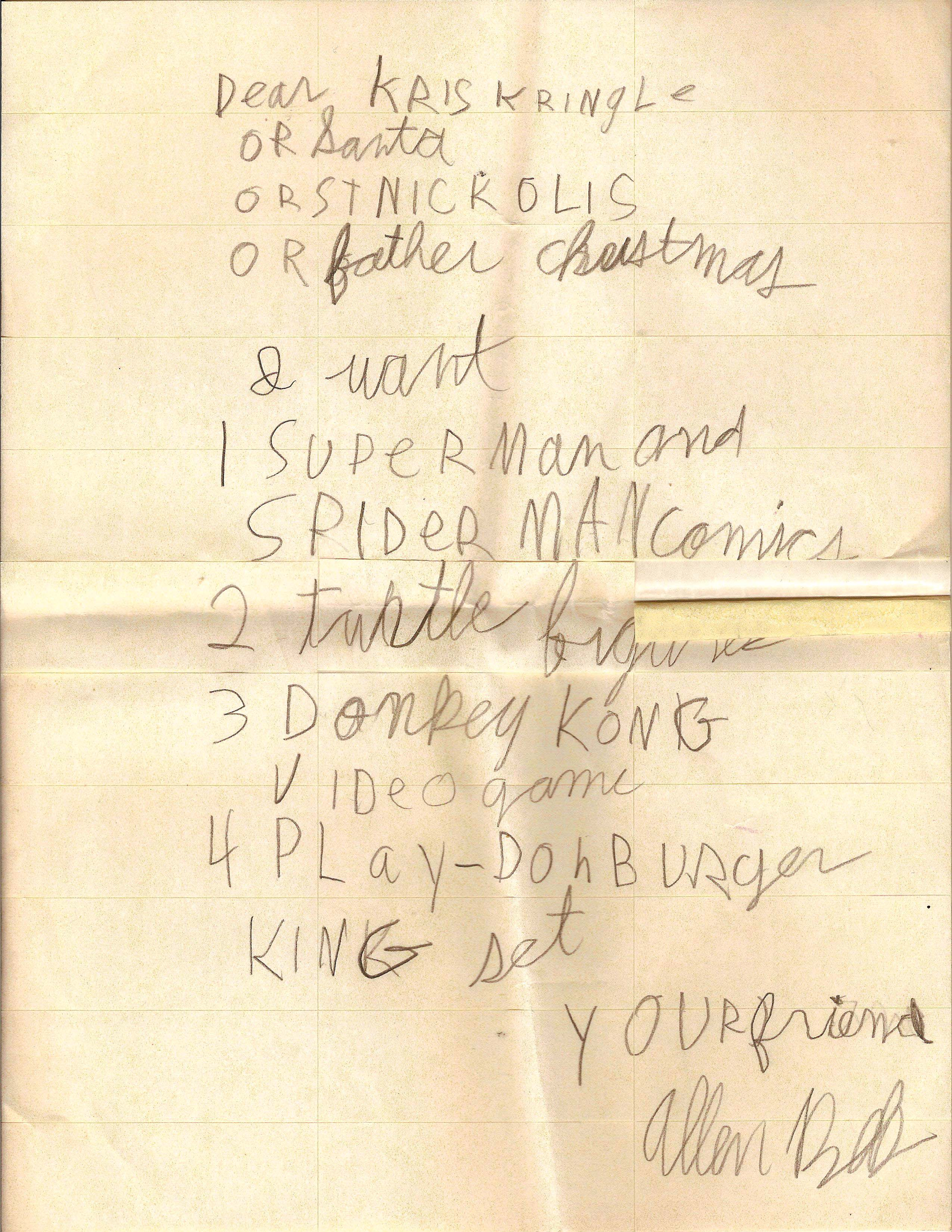
A child's letter to Santa Claus.

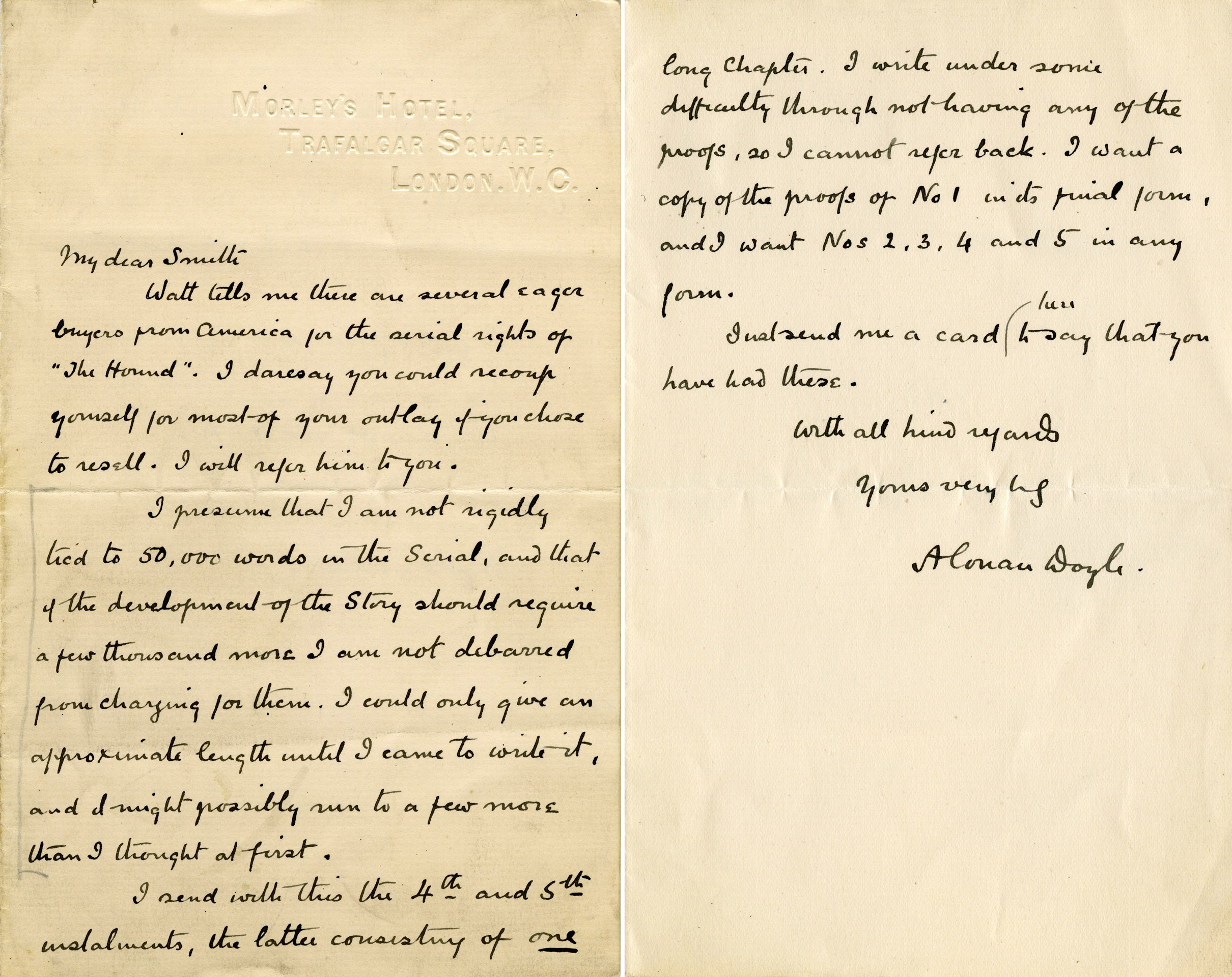
A letter from Arthur Conan Doyle about his 1902 novel The Hound of the Baskervilles.

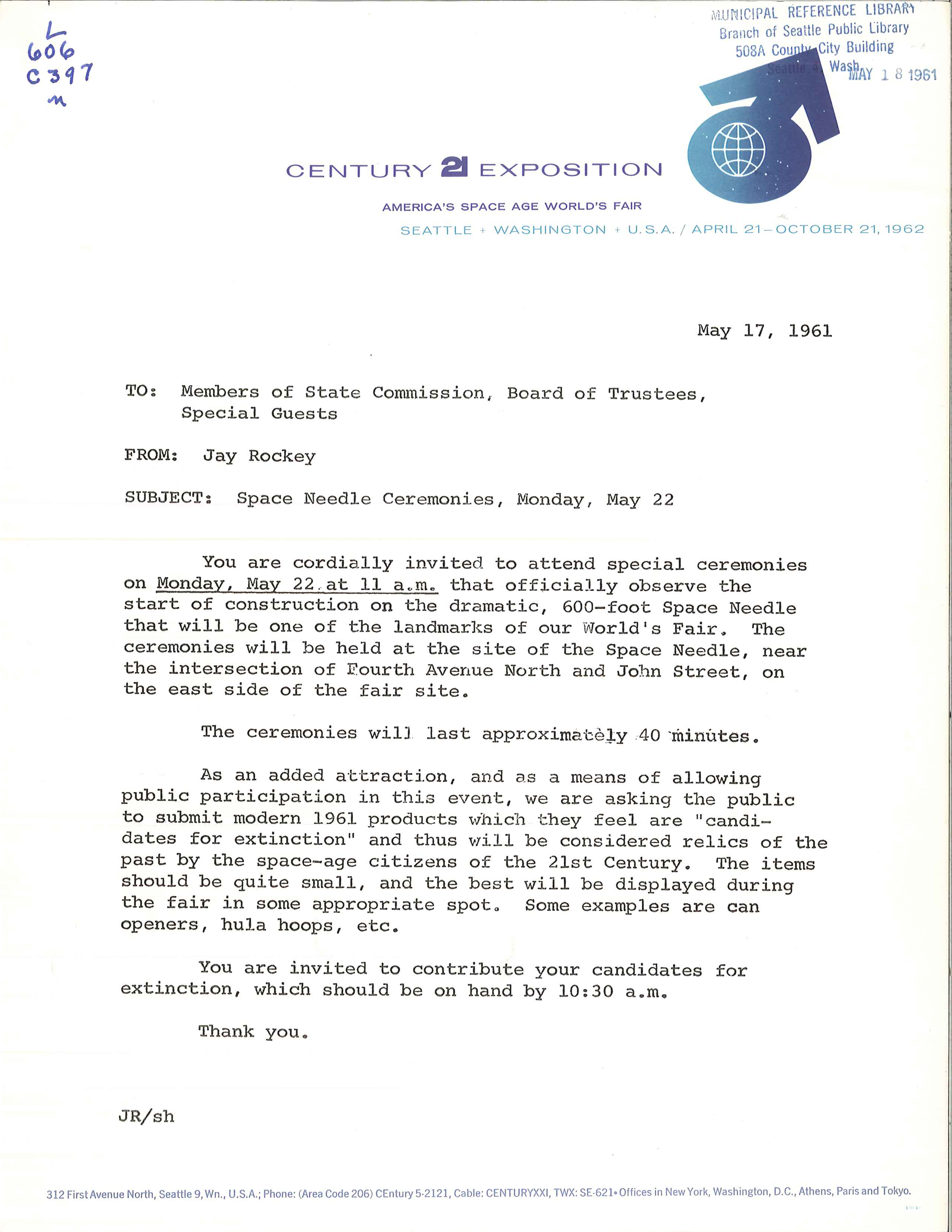
An invitation letter to the ground-breaking of the Seattle Space Needle, 1961.

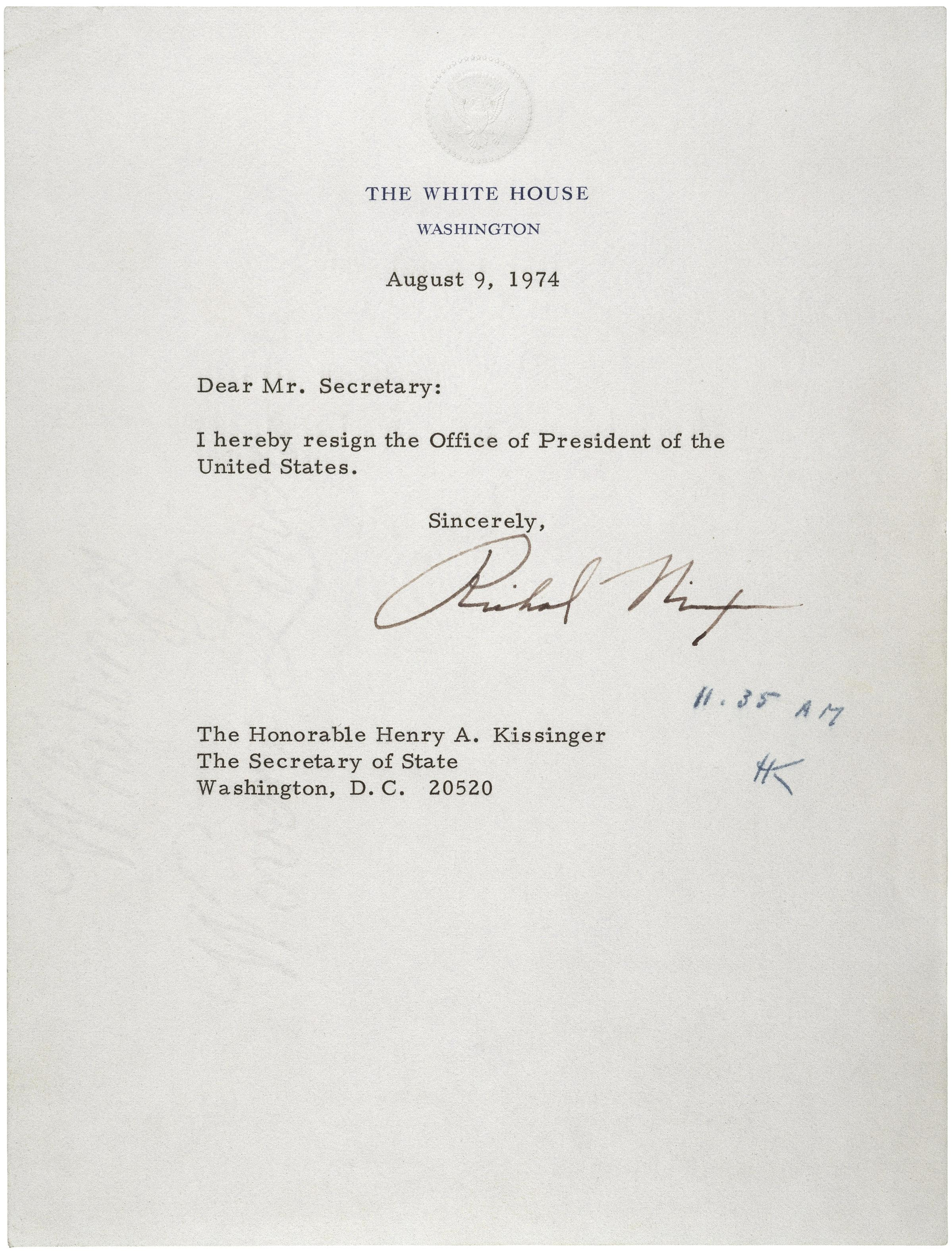
The resignation letter of U.S. president Richard Nixon, 1974.

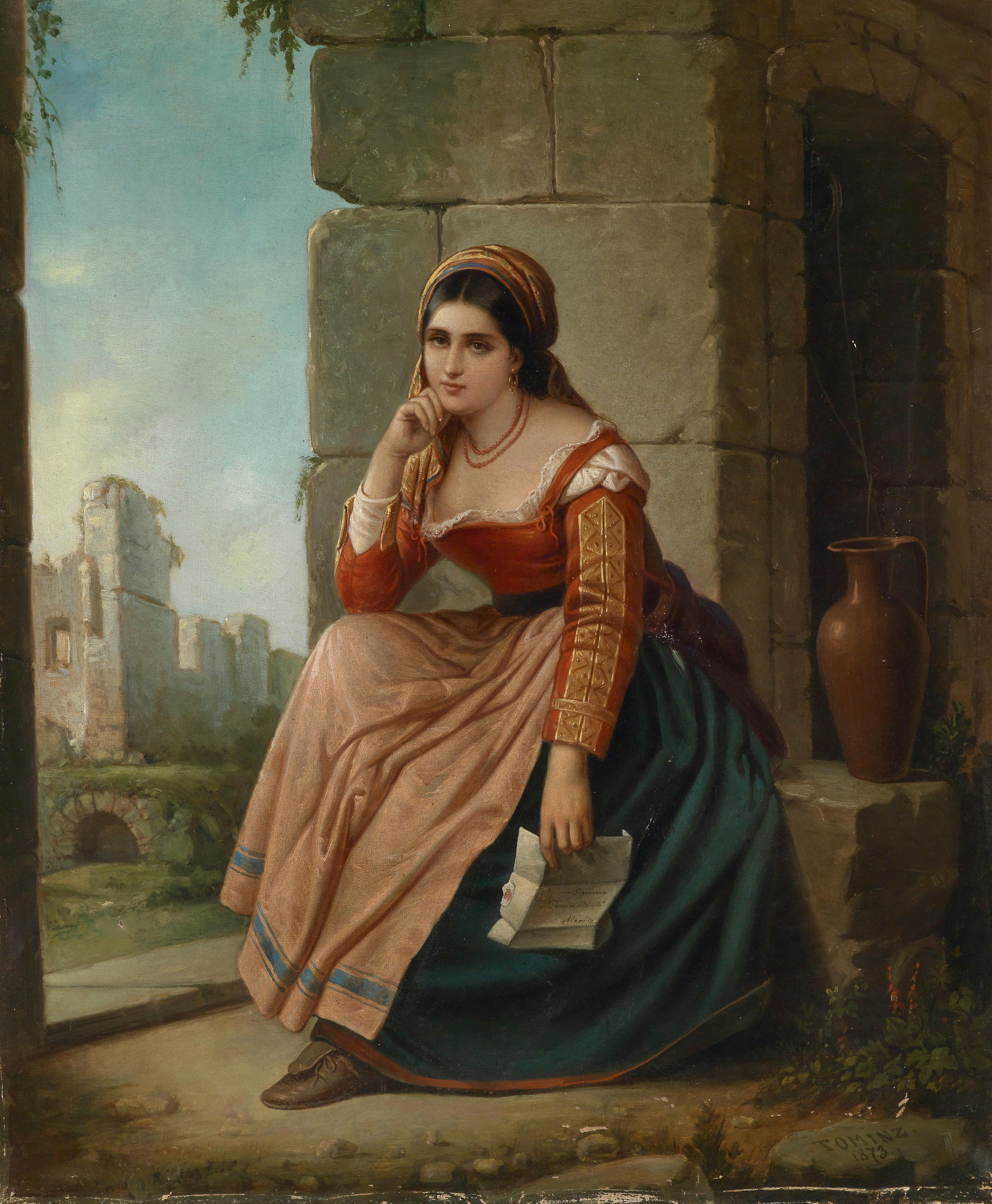
A letter sheet. Augusto Tominz - The Letter, 1873

== See also ==
- Address
- Ars dictaminis
- Avis de réception
- De conscribendis epistolis
- Envelope
- Letter box
- Letter collection
- Mail
- Manuscript
- Message in a bottle
- Pen pal
- Proof of delivery
- Return receipt
- Salutation
- Secrecy of correspondence
- Snail mail
- Valediction
- Victorian letter writing guides
- Virtual mailbox
