= Voicemail (disambiguation) =

Voicemail is a centralized system of managing telephone messages.

Voicemail or Voice Mail may also refer to:

- Voice Mail (album), an album by John Wetton
- Voice Mail (band), a dancehall reggae trio
- Audio letter sending recordings by postal mail
- Voicemail, a song by Antarctigo Vespucci
