= Love letter =

Expression of love in written form

A love letter

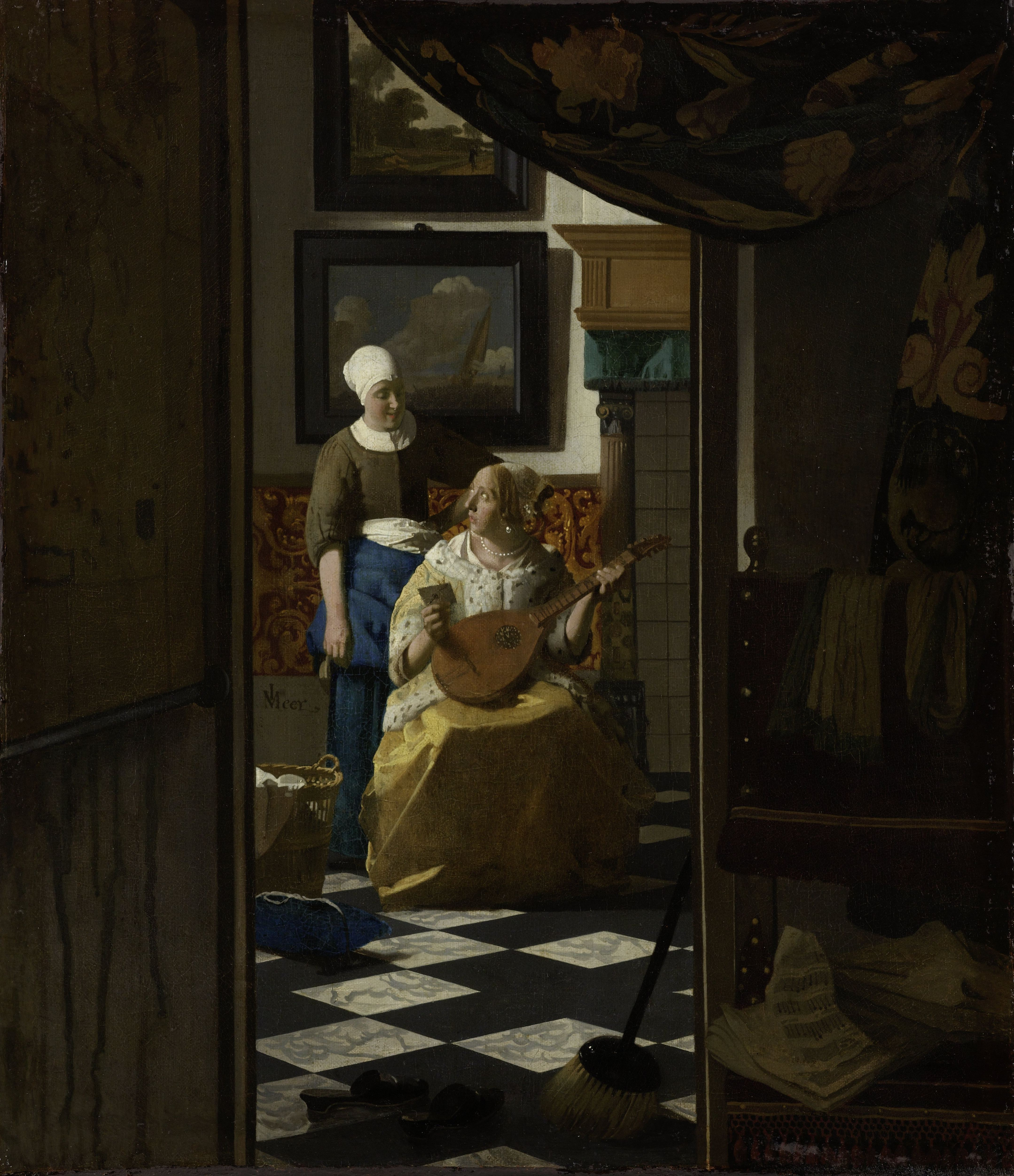
The Love Letter by Johannes Vermeer, c. 1669-70

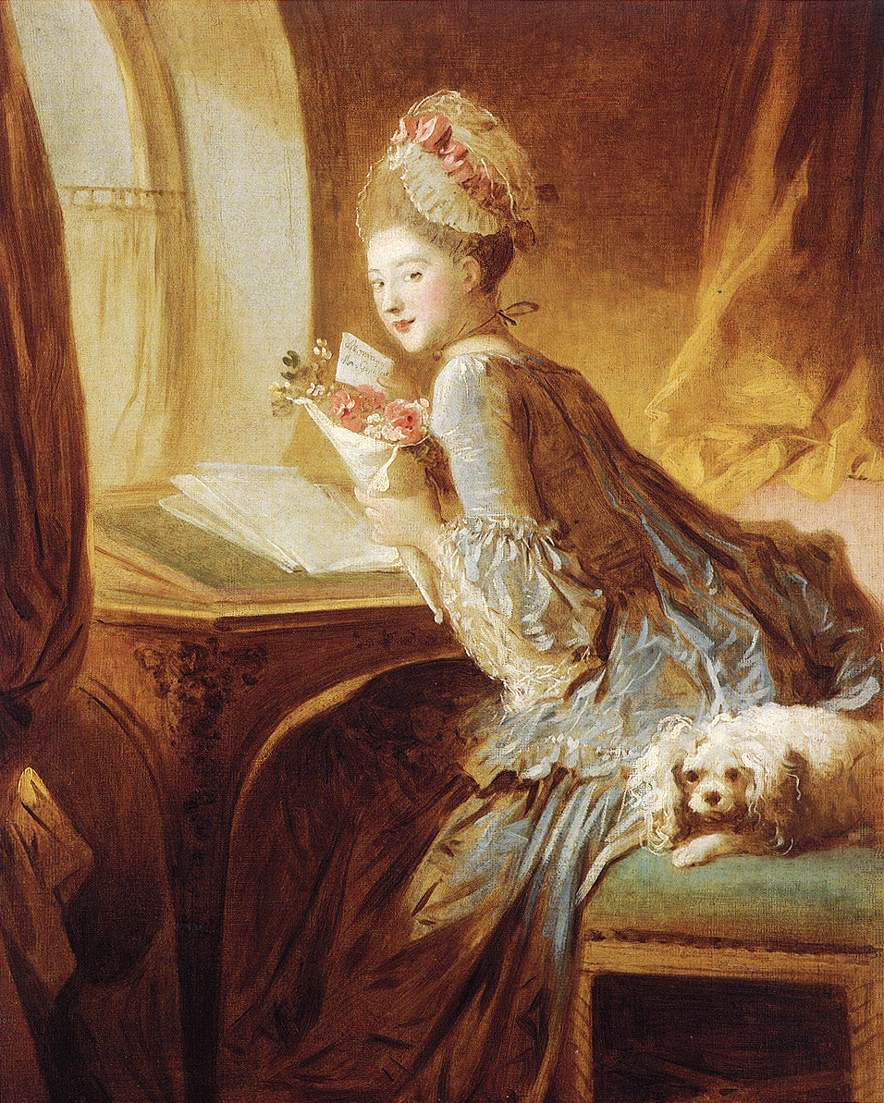
The Love Letter by Jean-Honoré Fragonard, c. 1770

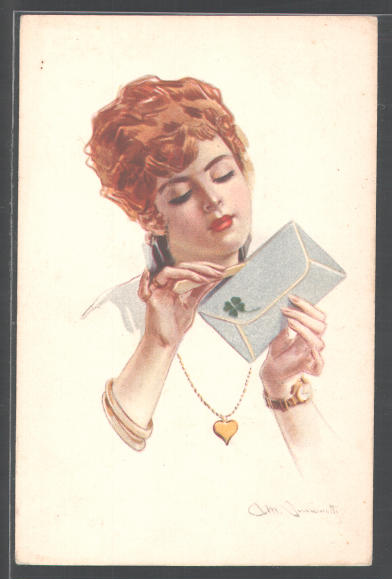
Opening a love letter by Amedeo Simonetti

A love letter is an expression of love in written form. However delivered, the letter may be anything from a short and simple message of love to a lengthy explanation and description of feelings.

== History ==
One of the oldest references to a love letter dates to Indian mythology of more than 5,000 years ago. Mentioned in the Bhagavatha Purana, book 10, chapter 52, it is addressed by princess Rukmini to King Krishna and carried to him by her Brahmin messenger Sunanda.

Examples from Ancient Egypt range from the most formal, and possibly practical – "The royal widow [...] Ankhesenamun wrote a letter to the king of the Hittites, Egypt's old enemy, begging him to send one of his sons to Egypt to marry her" – to the down-to-earth: Let me "bathe in thy presence, that I may let thee see my beauty in my tunic of finest linen, when it is wet". A fine expression of literary skill can be found in Imperial China: when a heroine, faced with an arranged marriage, wrote to her childhood sweetheart, he exclaimed, "What choice talent speaks in her well-chosen words [...] everything breathes the style of a Li T'ai Po. How on earth can anyone want to marry her off to some humdrum clod?"

In Ancient Rome, "the tricky construction and reception of the love letter" formed the center of Ovid's Ars Amatoria or Art of Love: "The love letter is situated at the core of Ovidian erotics". Roman Emperor Marcus Aurelius Antoninus and writer of Meditations, exchanged love letters with his tutor, Marcus Cornelius Fronto.

The Middle Ages saw the formal development of the Ars dictaminis, including the art of the love letter from opening to close. For salutations, "the scale in love letters is nicely graded from 'To the noble and discreet lady P., adorned with every elegance, greeting' to the lyrical fervors of 'Half of my soul and light of my eyes [...] greeting, and that delight which is beyond all word and deed to express'". The substance similarly "ranges from doubtful equivoque to exquisite and fantastic dreaming", rising to appeals for "the assurance 'that you care for me the way I care for you'".

The love letter continued to be taught as a skill at the start of the 18th century, as in Richard Steele's Spectator. Perhaps in reaction, the artificiality of the concept came to be distrusted by the Romantics: "'A love-letter? My letter – a love-letter? It [...]came straight from my heart'".

In Victorian America, it was expected that endearments and affection should be kept strictly private. Thus, exchanging love letters was a widespread courtship activity, particularly among the upper- and middle-class. Etiquette manuals, magazines, and book-length guides provided advice and sample letters while at the same time insisting that the writer should write naturally and sincerely. Reading and writing love letters was seen as an extremely intimate experience, akin to being in the presence of their loved one.

=== 20th century ===
The love letter continued to flourish in the first half of the 20th century – F. Scott Fitzgerald writes about a 1920s flapper "absorbed in composing one of those non-committal, marvelously elusive letters that only a young girl can write."

Virginia Woolf and Vita Sackville-West's flirtatious love letters were one aspect of their complicated relationship. Nigel Nicolson, Sackville-West's son, called Woolf's Orlando "the longest and most charming love-letter in literature" because of the inspiration Woolf took from her friend and lover, Sackville-West.

Before the development of widespread means of telecommunications, letters were one of the few ways for a distant couple to remain in contact, particularly in wartime. The strains on either end of such a relationship could intensify emotions and lead to letters going beyond simple communication to expressions of love, longing and desires. It is claimed that the very act of writing can trigger feelings of love in the writer. Secrecy, delays in transit, and the exigencies of maneuvers could further complicate the communication between two parties, whatever their degree of involvement. So precious could love letters be that even already read ones would even be brought into battle and read again for solace during a break in the action. Others would defer, compartmentalizing their feelings and leaving a letter folded away where it would cause no pain.

During World War II, anti-aircraft gunner Gilbert Bradley and infantryman Gordon Bowsher exchanged intimate love letters, which are currently owned by the Oswestry Town Museum. Because of the criminalization of homosexuality in England during the 1940s, large collections of queer love letters from that period are rare.

In the second half of the century, with the coming of a more permissive society, and the immediacy afforded by the technology of the Information Age, the nuanced art of the love letter became old-fashioned, even anachronistic. Despite the availability of new forms of communication, many couples still exchanged love letters. In 1953, Rachel Carson (naturalist and writer of Silent Spring) met Dorothy Freeman and two exchanged about 900 letters over 12 years. While they destroyed some of their letters to protect themselves, Freeman's granddaughter edited the surviving ones, which were published in 1995.

Other love letter-writers of the 20th century include anthropologists Margaret Mead and Ruth Benedict, painters Frida Kahlo and Diego Rivera, poets Allen Ginsberg and Peter Orlovsky, and first lady Eleanor Roosevelt and journalist Lorena Hickok.

=== 21st century ===
With the arrival of the Internet and its iconic AOL Instant Messenger (AIM) notice "You've Got Mail", written expressions of love had a resurgence in popular culture – and provided the plot device for a 1998 romantic comedy by that name, You've Got Mail. As a result, websites sharing advice on how to write love letters were established in the 2000s.

In mid-2000, a computer worm named ILOVEYOU spread rapidly by sending malicious emails to contacts pretending to contain a love letter.

As ever, an advantage of written communication – being able to express thoughts and feelings as they come to a writer's mind – remains. For some this is easier than doing so face to face. Also, the very act of communicating a permanent expression of feelings to another conveys the importance of the writer's emotions to the recipient.

In contrast, in mobile, Twitter or Tweet, "telegraphese" is widespread, and a sign-off such as "LOL! B cool B N touch bye" could have the ring of being composed by a "disinterested young mother".

== Form ==
A love letter has no specific form, length, or writing medium; the sentiments communicated, and how, determine whether a letter is a love letter or not.

The range of emotions expressed can span from adulation to obsession, and include devotion, disappointment, grief and indignation, self-confidence, ambition, impatience, self-reproach and resignation.

A love letter may take another literary form than simple prose. A historically popular one was the poem, particularly in the form of a sonnet. Shakespeare's sonnets are particularly cited. Structure and suggestions of love letters have been examined in works such as 1992's The Book of Love: Writers and Their Love Letters and the 2008 anthology Love Letters of Great Men. Cathy Davidson, author of the former, confesses that after reading hundreds of love letters for her collection, "The more titles I read, the less I was able to generalize about female versus male ways of loving or expressing that love".

After the end of a relationship, returning love letters to the sender or burning them can be a release to their recipient, or intended to hurt their author. In the past, return could also be a matter of honor, as a love letter, particularly from a lady, could be compromising or embarrassing, to the point where the use of "compromising letters...for blackmailing or other purposes" became a Victorian cliche.

While scented stationery for love letters is commercially available, some writers prefer to use their own perfume to trigger emotions specifically associated with being with them.

== See also ==
- Hate mail
- Poison pen letter
- Sexting
- Text messaging
- Valentine's Day
- Victorian letter writing guides
- Dear John letter
