= Return receipt =

Notification of email message status

In email, a return receipt is an acknowledgment by the recipient's email client to the sender of receipt of an email message. What acknowledgment, if any, is sent by the recipient to the sender is dependent on the email software of the recipient.

Two notification services are available for email: delivery status notifications (DSNs) and message disposition notifications (MDNs). Whether such an acknowledgment of receipt is sent depends on the configuration of the recipient's email software.

== Delivery status notifications ==
DSN is both a service that may optionally be provided by Message Transfer Agents (MTAs) using the Simple Mail Transfer Protocol (SMTP), or a message format used to return indications of message delivery to the sender of the message. Specifically, the DSN SMTP service is used to request indications of successful delivery or delivery failure (in the DSN format) be returned. Issuance of a DSN upon delivery failure is the default behavior, whereas issuance of a DSN upon successful delivery requires a specific request from the sender.

However, for various reasons, it is possible for a message to be delivered, and a DSN is returned to the sender indicating successful delivery, but the message subsequently fails to be seen by the recipient or even made available to them.

The DSN SMTP extension, message format, and associated delivery status codes are specified in RFCs 3461 through 3464 and 6522.

== Message disposition notifications ==
MDNs provide a notification of the "disposition" of a message - indicating, for example, whether it is read by a recipient, discarded before being read, etc. However, for privacy reasons, and also for backward compatibility, requests for MDNs are entirely advisory in nature - i.e. recipients are free to ignore such requests. The format and usage of MDNs are specified in RFC 8098.

A description of how multiple Mail User Agents (MUAs) should handle the generation of MDNs in an Internet Message Access Protocol (IMAP4) environment is provided in RFC 3503.

A non-standard but widely used way to request return receipts is with the "Return-Receipt-To:" (RRT) field in the e-mail header, with the email return address specified. The first time a user opens an email message containing this field in the header, the client will typically prompt the user whether to send a return receipt.

== See also ==
- Acknowledge character
- Avis de réception, postal equivalent
- Document automation in supply chain management & logistics
- Email tracking § Return-receipts
- Proof of delivery
- Web bug (which are frequently used in spamming as a way of determining which spam recipients open (and presumably read) before deleting it)
