= Hainaim Publishing Co., Ltd. =

South Korean book publishing company

Hainaim Publishing Co., Ltd. (해냄출판사) (established in 1983) is one of the largest book publishers in South Korea. They have published more than 1400 books in Korean as well as English language.

The company publishes original Korean works, and also cooperates with major English-language publishers and literary agencies to publish English and other titles in South Korea. Their Korean language best sellers include the novels The Taeback Mountains by Jo Jung-rae which sold 4,500,000 copies, and Moo-kung-hwa Has Blossomed by Kim Jin-Myung which sold 4,000,000 copies. The company's translated English titles include He's Just Not That Into You by Greg Behrendt, Love Letters of Great Men by John Kirkland, Comet by Carl Sagan and Ann Druyan, and the Chicken Soup for the Soul series.
