= Love Letters of Great Men =

Anthology of romantic letters

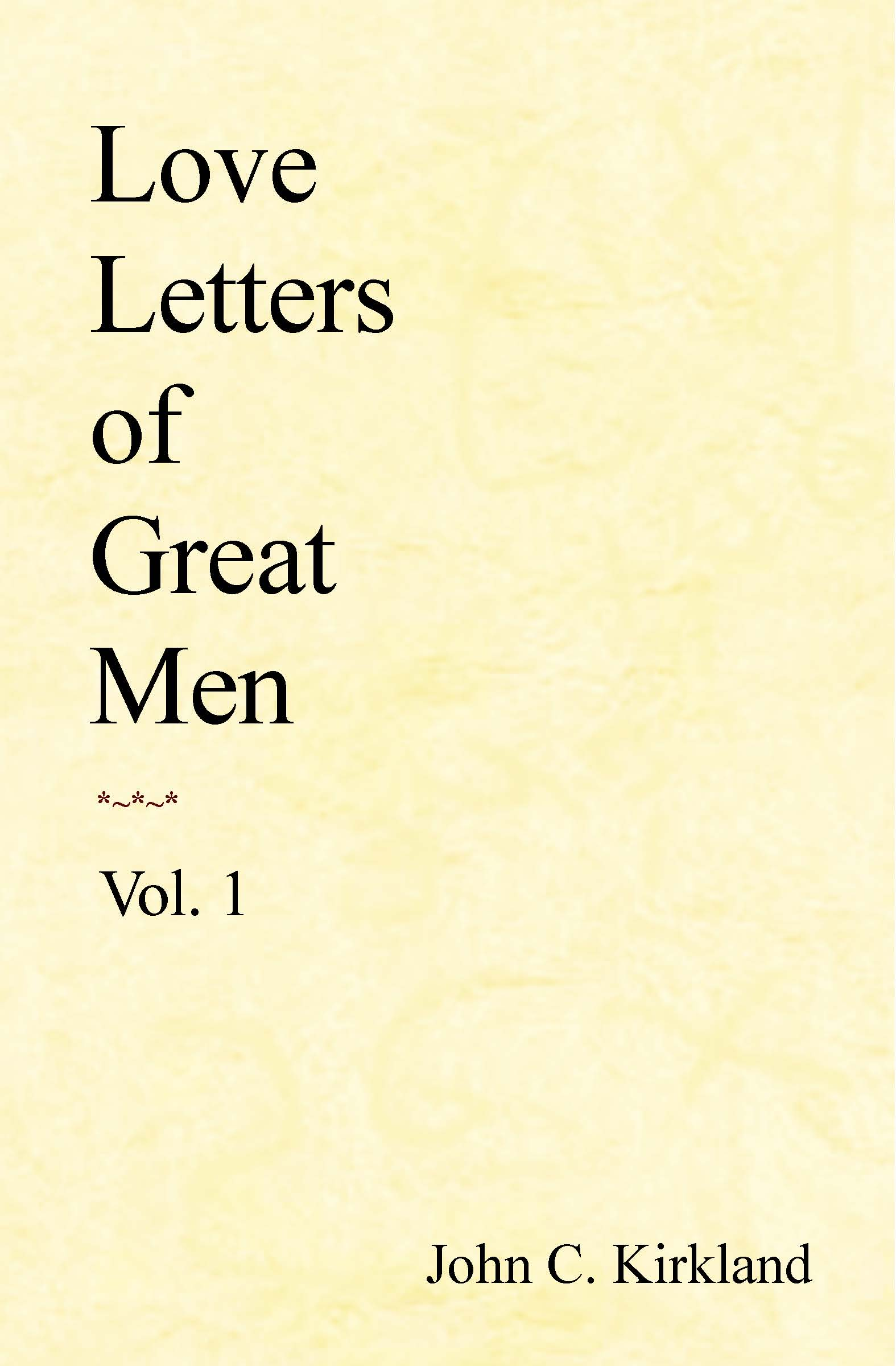
- Author: John C. Kirkland
- Language: English
- Genre: Anthology, Poetry
- Publisher: Publishing House ERSEN and Hainaim Publishing Co., Ltd.
- Publication date: May 12, 2008
- Publication place: United States, Estonia and South Korea
- Media type: Print (Paperback)
- Pages: 138
- ISBN: 1-4382-5724-4
- OCLC: 259821203

Love Letters of Great Men, Vol. 1 is an anthology of romantic letters written by leading male historical figures. The book plays a key role in the plot of the American film Sex and the City.

The book includes love letters written by Roman poet Ovid, explorer Sir Walter Raleigh, writer Johann Wolfgang von Goethe, novelist Nathaniel Hawthorne, poet Robert Browning, short story writer Edgar Allan Poe, novelist Mark Twain, mathematician Lewis Carroll, physicist Pierre Curie, playwright George Bernard Shaw, adventurer Jack London, Admiral Robert Peary, President Woodrow Wilson, poet Lord Byron, poet John Keats, philosopher Voltaire, King Henry VIII of England, President George Washington, Emperor Napoleon I of France, painter Vincent van Gogh, composer Wolfgang Amadeus Mozart, and composer Ludwig van Beethoven, among others. It also includes biographical information about the writers and recipients, the circumstances and relationships that led to the letters, and explanations of what occurred in the years following the correspondence.

The book of love letters written by great men throughout history was originally created as a prop for the Sex and the City film but was published in response to fan demand. The one that appears exactly as in the movie was authored by John C. Kirkland and published on May 12, 2008, the same date the film premiered. The book was ranked among the top 250 Bestsellers in Books on Amazon.com, and was the #1 ranked Literature & Fiction book in both the Letters & Correspondence and Poetry categories in September 2008, the month the DVD of the film was released. On November 25, 2008, St. Martin's Press published a book entitled Love Letters of Great Women edited by Ursula Doyle, which it says was also inspired by the Sex and the City movie.
