= Crossed letter =

Letter containing two sets of writing at right angles

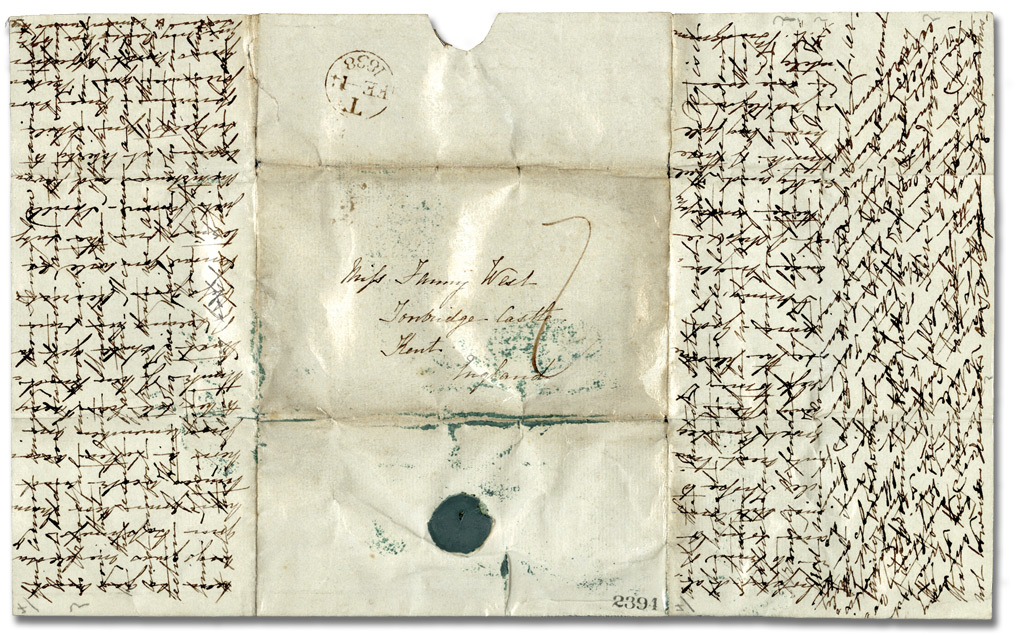
A crossed letter, 1837, Ontario, Canada

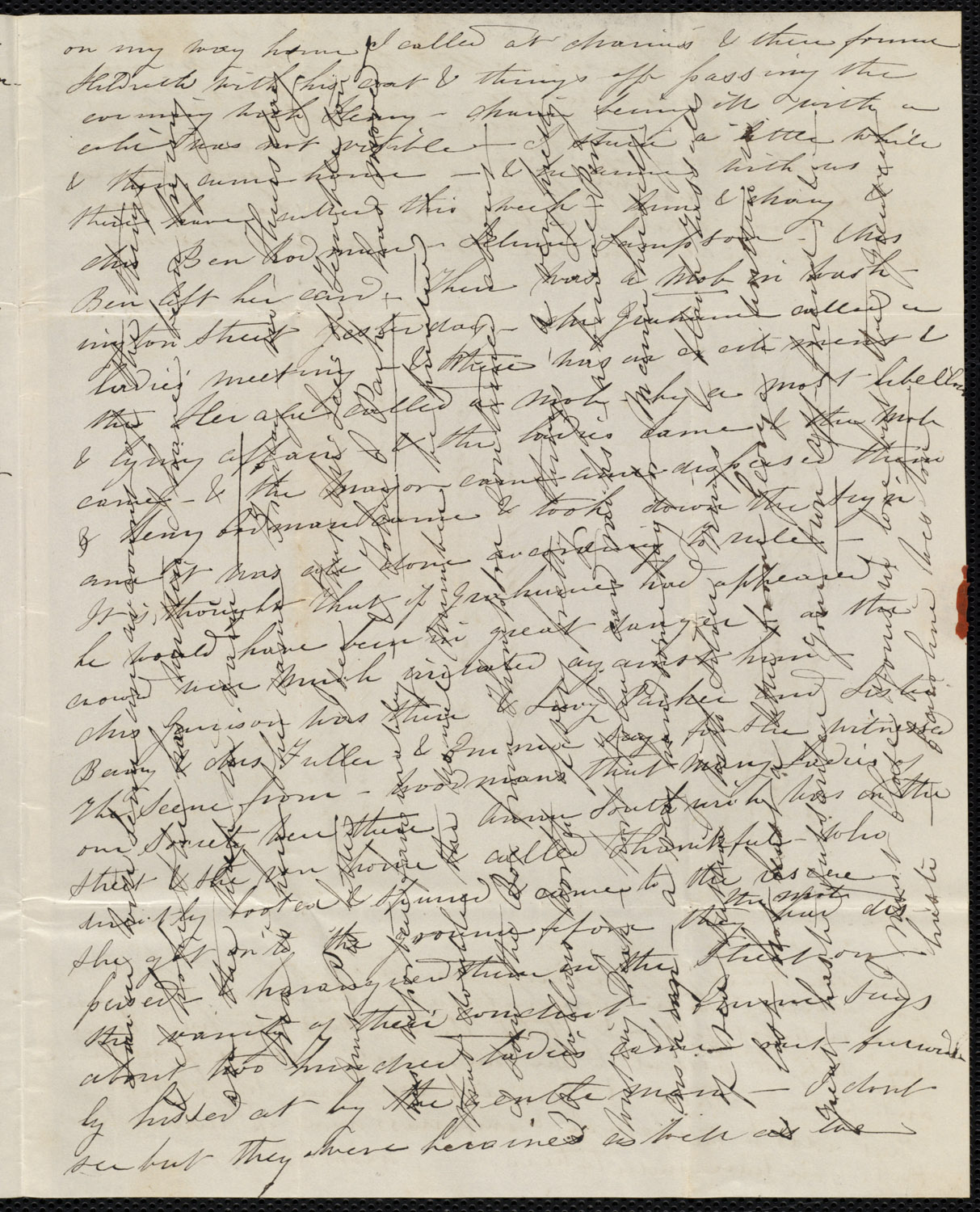
Cross-hatched letter of 1837, Massachusetts, USA.

A crossed letter is a manuscript letter which contains two separate sets of writing, one written over the other at right-angles. This was done during the early days of the postal system in the 19th century to save on expensive postage charges, as well as to save paper. This technique is also called cross-hatching or cross-writing.

A cross letter is distinct from a palimpsest, as cross-hatched manuscripts were written this way at one sitting or for the same purpose (such as a diary), rather than being re-used later.
