= Victorian letter writing guides =

19th-century English writing conventions

As the use of letters increased in popularity during the Victorian era, guides began to emerge on how to correctly write and form a letter and as to what was proper, and what was not. Many of these conventions are a way of understanding tensions in nineteenth-century England, such as the urge to speak from the heart, but never more than was proper.

== Physical concerns ==
A letter's physical appearance, in addition to its content, was a concern for letter-writing guides. For men, guides advocated plain paper and for women, a light spritz of perfume was sometimes acceptable. Other sources, however, disagreed and suggested high outward ornamentation such as ribbons, flowery drawings, and interesting colors could be used by females, but part of this may have been the date of the guide, as vogue changed by the decade. Earlier in the century, ribbons were popular, but fashion changed to heavy cream paper in the 1880s and then monogrammed letterheads by the end of the nineteenth century. The manner of sealing the letter also changed over the years. Originally it had been wax wafers and dried gum, but as time went on colored wax became more prevalent, the use of which was dictated by social conventions. Black wax was always associated with mourning, but red wax was to be used in letters between men, particularly those dealing with business, and letters from men to women. Women were free to use a range of colors, no matter the correspondent.

Ink was debated; though all sides agreed on bold black ink, blue was sometimes suggested as an alternative, and all other colors shunned, though most letter-writing guides acknowledged that they had once been in fashion.

== Contradictions ==
Letter writing guides advised writing with absolute feeling and being cautious about saying too much. They also warned against saying the wrong things, regardless of whether these wrong things had real feelings behind them. Many guides cautioned that anyone could read a letter and thereby make inferences about its author, even if those corresponded with assured that they burnt the letters after reading them.

=== Matrimonial letters ===
The caution about appearance in letters was stressed in matrimonial letters, even as women and men were encouraged to still write from the heart. Men were warned against complimenting their chosen bride too heavily, as it seemed insincere; rather, their moral traits and the feminine virtue of indifference were set as prime subjects to appreciate in a marriage proposal. Women, meanwhile, were urged not to be too unguarded in their letters, even in the acceptance of a proposal, to only thank and address the man's moral qualities. Love letters did not end in ‘love,’ but more frequently simply as ‘ever your friend’.

== Example letters ==
From a Gentleman to a Lady confessing a Change of Sentiment.

Miss Rachel,--Your note has opened my eyes to the folly and wrong of the course I have pursued of late. All night I have been pacing my floor, trying to decide what course it was my duty to pursue, and I have decided to answer you as frankly as you desire.

I will not attempt to excuse myself, for I deserve your anger, but I will only say that I was myself deceived in my own feelings. When I asked you to marry me, I believed that we were congenial, and that I could make you happy. I was not rich, but had sufficient, as I thought, for comfort, and thinking you would be content with a moderate competency, I invited you to share mine. Closer intimacy has proved my error. Your extravagant wishes are utterly beyond my means, and your bitter and sarcastic remarks upon those of your friends who are not wealthy prove that you covet a life of luxury.

Again, for you ask for frankness, you have so often pained me by your uneven and sullen temper, that I foresee a life of misery for both after marriage.

I know that honor binds me to you, and therefore will not ask for my release if you do not desire it, but will, if we marry, endeavor faithfully to make you demand the reasons for my coldness, I have given them.

Leaving our engagement entirely in your hands, I am, Ever your friend,

Henry Hendricks.

From a Gentleman to a Lady Requesting an Explanation of Unfavorable Comments upon him.

Dear Lucy,--I have just had a long interview with a mutual friend of yours and mine, who has surprised me by repeating your unfounded assertions with regard to me. Of course, what is merely your opinion, I have no right to resent, though I regret that it should be so unfavorable, but I have a right to demand your grounds for asserting that I am an arrant flirt, a hypocrite, and concerned in more than one dishonorable transaction.

Will you have the kindness to inform me with whom I have flirted, how played the hypocrite, and in what dishonorable transactions I have been concerned.

Paul Smith.

Reply to the Foregoing.

Paul Smith, Esq.,--The high tone of your letter might impose upon one who was not so well acquainted with your history previous to your arrival at this place as I happen to be. My opinion was founded upon a knowledge of your life while you resided in St. Louis.

When I inform you that Mrs. Carrie Ryder is one of my most intimate friends and constant correspondent, you will not again request a list of your misdoings. If you consider your course of conduct in deceiving your uncle, endeavoring to ruin your young cousin Charles, and attempting to elope with an heiress of fifteen, honorable, I can only say that I differ in opinion.

Lucy Johnston.

== The value of letters ==
Aside from their use as a means of correspondence, letters can be seen as a form of a representation of people's lived experiences during different historical eras. Such information can be gleaned from letters public and private.

Believing that letters are valuable historical documents, James Willis Westlake, who was a public school teacher born just before the Victorian era in England in 1830, had moved to America at a young age where he published his book on the subject. Westlake says letters are valuable in acquiring knowledge of past people and events. He believes they are important in gaining insight into the moral lives of great people after which one's behavior could be modeled. Westlake also claimed that the use of letters of well-written and eloquent individuals can be adapted to improve letter-writing style.

In the New London Fashionable Gentleman's Writer, is an example of the usage of letter writing as a collection of quaint correspondences between hopeful men and the ladies they wished to court. Such a manual may have been used by anxious men as they prepared to write to their love interests and express their feelings, and perhaps by women as they decided how best to accept or reject the advances.

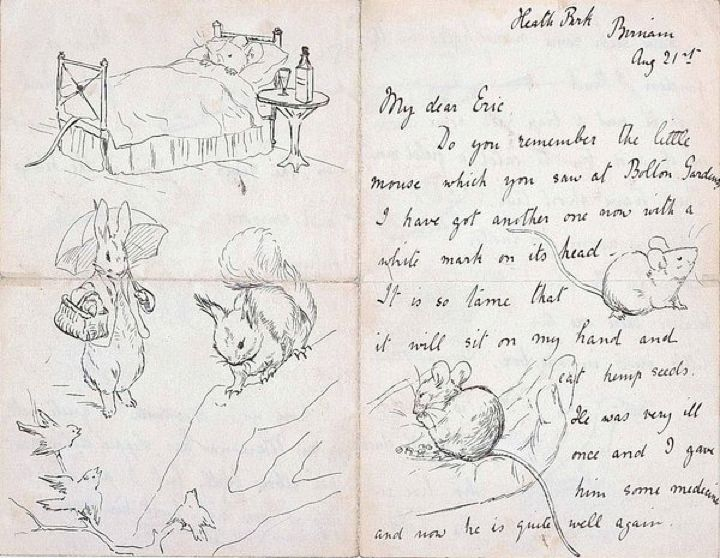
One of Beatrix Potter's illustrated letters

Some prominent figures turned to letter writing as a creative outlet. Emily Dickinson used her letters to push back against the constraints which women, herself included, faced during the era. Letter-writing was one of the few literary pursuits in which women were allowed to participate, and Dickinson used this to her advantage, infusing traditional letter-writing with her own artistic flair in order to develop her skills as a writer. George Howell, an amateur Victorian artist, used his letters to his brother as a space to combine his words and his artistic works. Similarly, Beatrix Potter, an author/illustrator, often included pictures in her letters as a means of comfort and relief from the pressures she faced from her family.

Children were taught the art of letter-writing, as well; they were particularly taught to form letters neatly with instructive books filled with drawing and line instruction. One of these such books, "Elementary Drawing Copy Books," incorporated traditional alphabet practice with instructions on drawing elements of the natural world. In addition to proper handwriting, young boys and girls were taught to compose letters for different reasons. Girls’ writing books taught them to use their writing skills for household management tasks, while those for boys taught proper forms for business correspondence.
