= Avis de réception =

Type of postal service

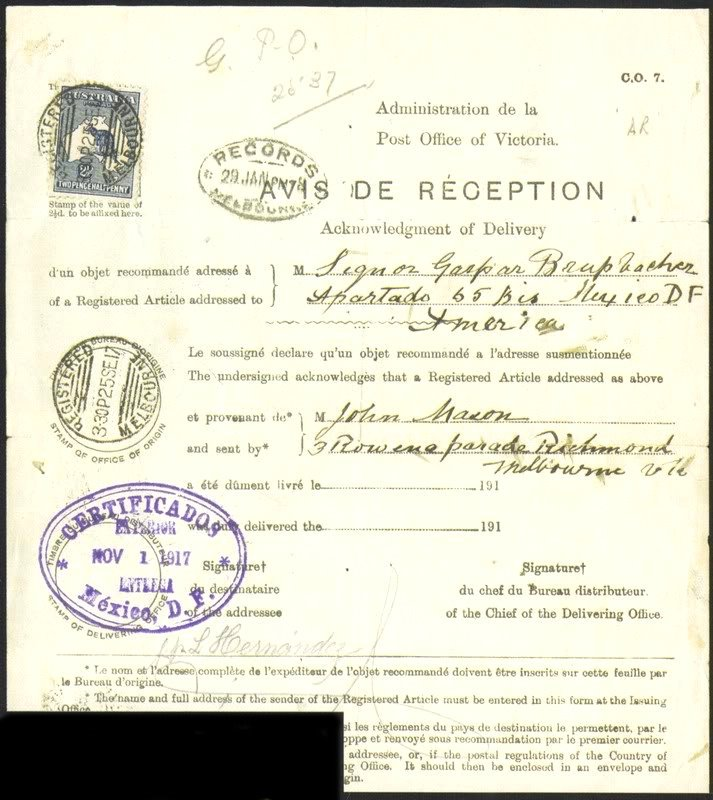
An international avis de réception form for a registered letter from Melbourne to Mexico 1917 (part).

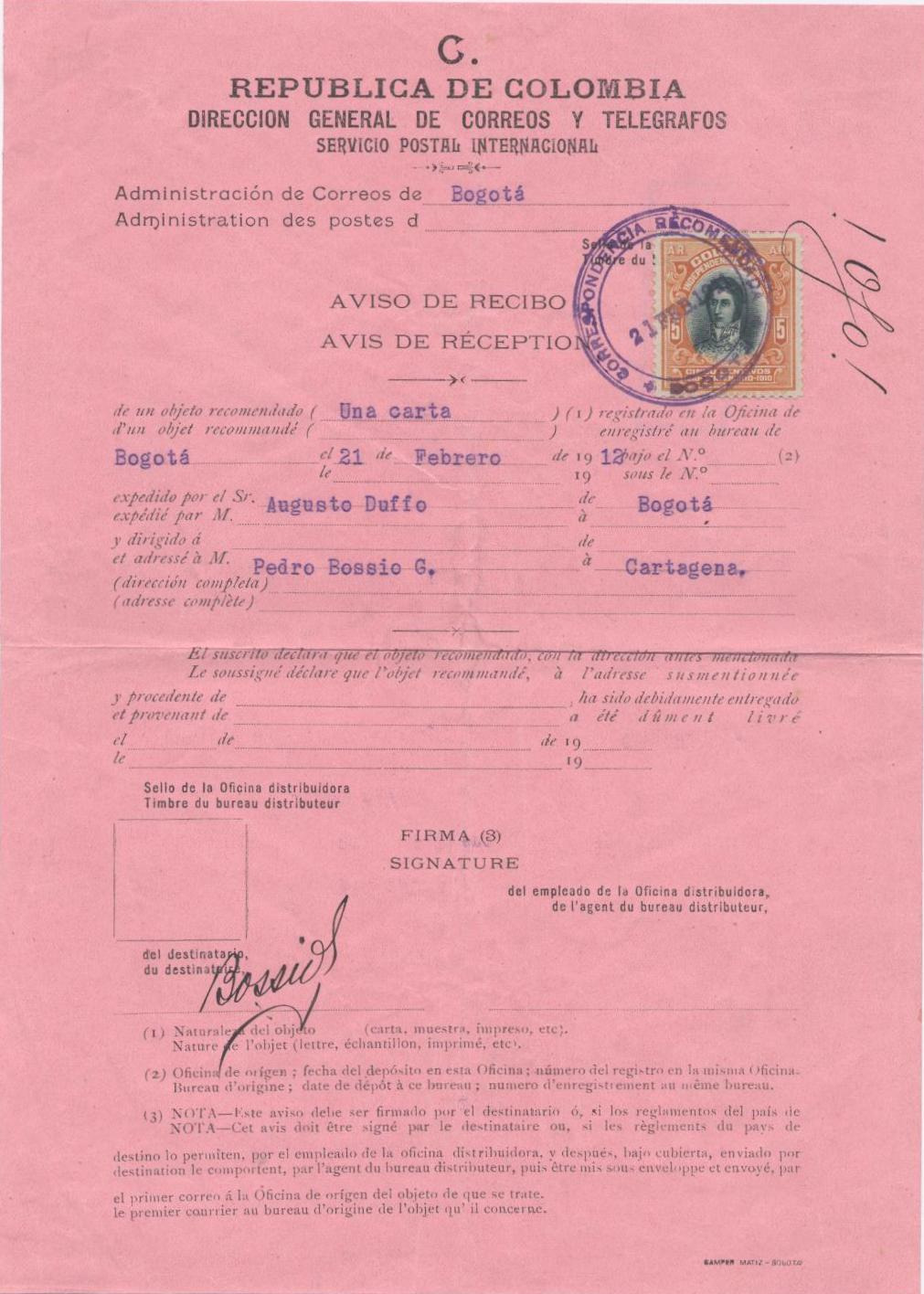
Colombia internal AR form 1912.

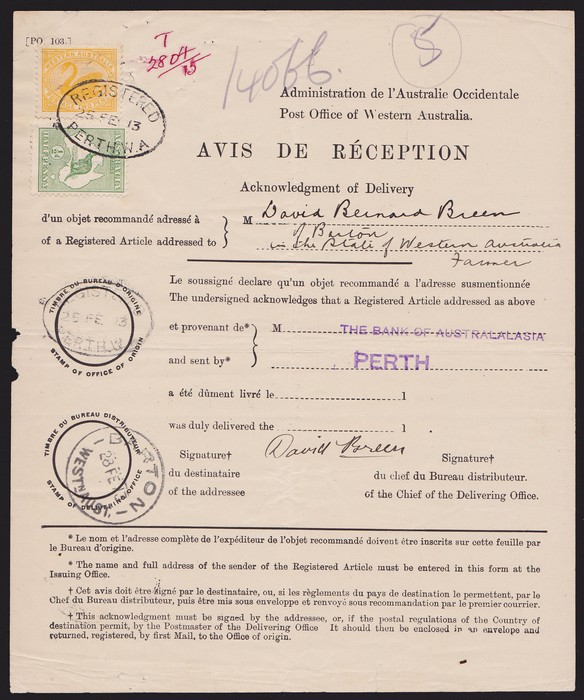
Internal use of AR in 1913 from Perth to Barton, Western Australia.

Avis de réception (English: advice or acknowledgment of receipt) is a postal service returning to the sender a form or card signed by the recipient. This is evidence that the letter was received, and these forms (or cards) are frequently seen with legal endorsements. It had existed under various names in some postal entities as early as the late 18th century, and was adopted by the General Postal Union (GPU) in 1875, and again by its successor, the Universal Postal Union (UPU) in 1879.

Equivalent terms include aviso de recibo, acknowledgment of receipt (Canada), advice of receipt, advice of delivery (UK and much of the Commonwealth), return receipt requested/required/wanted/demanded (US), Rückschein (Germany), ricevuta di ritorno (Italy), zwrotne potwierdzenie odbioru (Poland), aviso de recepción (Salvador 1897 stamps), and many others. The term accusé de réception is sometimes seen, although it is inaccurate. The standard abbreviations are AR and AD.

== Collecting ==
While obscure in some countries (such as Canada, Great Britain, and Australia), AR has long been popular in others, including India, France and its territories, and the United States. There is a great deal of postal history material associated with the AR service: postmarks, AR forms and cards, AR covers, AR covering envelopes for returning AR forms (in use until the early to middle 1920s), rates, and practices. The service is still offered by many national post offices and postal stationery continues to be issued in connection with it.

== Gallery ==
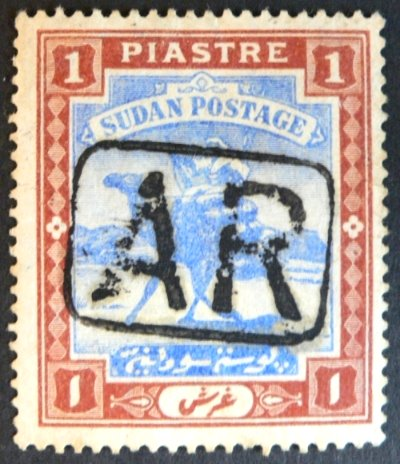
An AR mark on a stamp of Sudan.

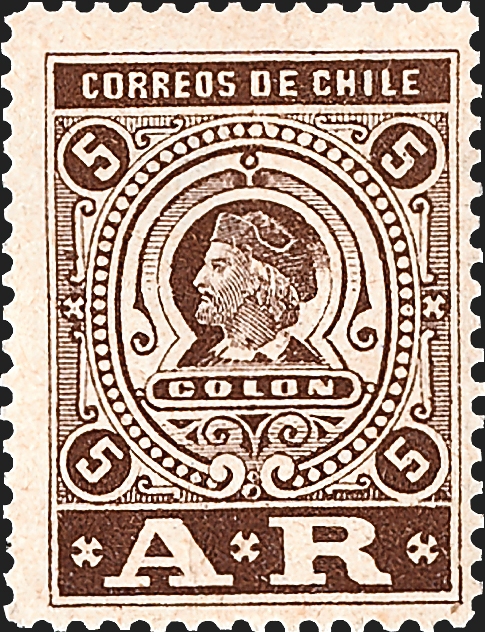
An AR stamp of Chile, 1894.

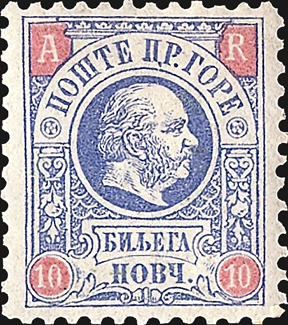
An AR stamp of Montenegro, 1895.

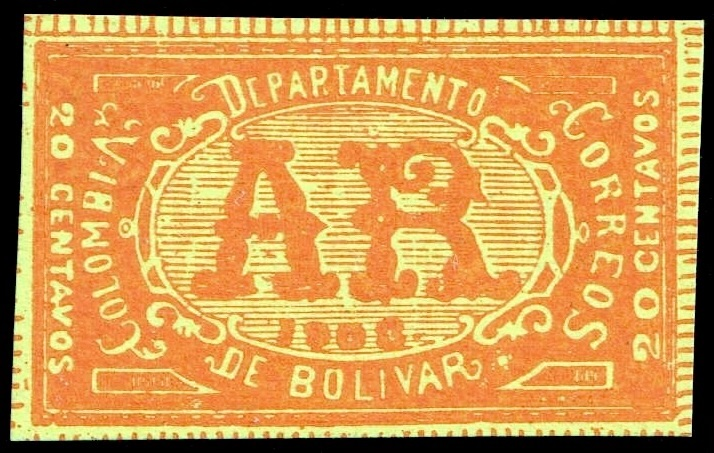
An AR stamp of Bolivar, 1903

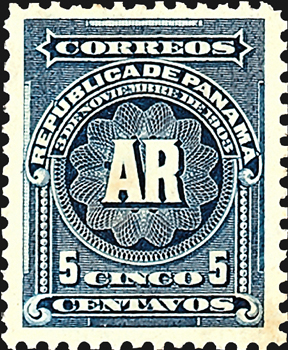
An AR stamp of Panama, 1904.

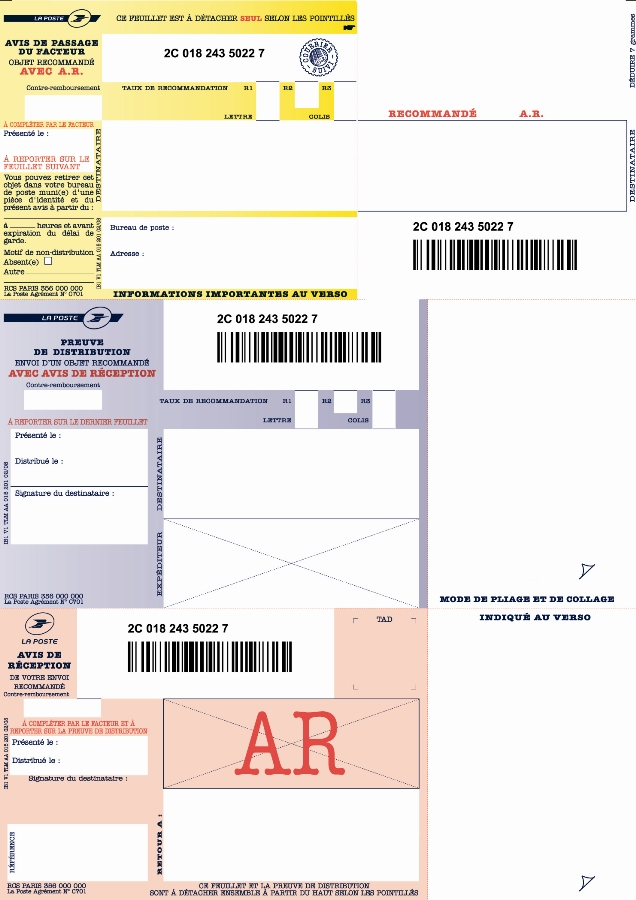
Modern AR stationery of La Poste, France.

== See also ==
- Proof of delivery
- Return receipt, email equivalent
