= Audio letter =

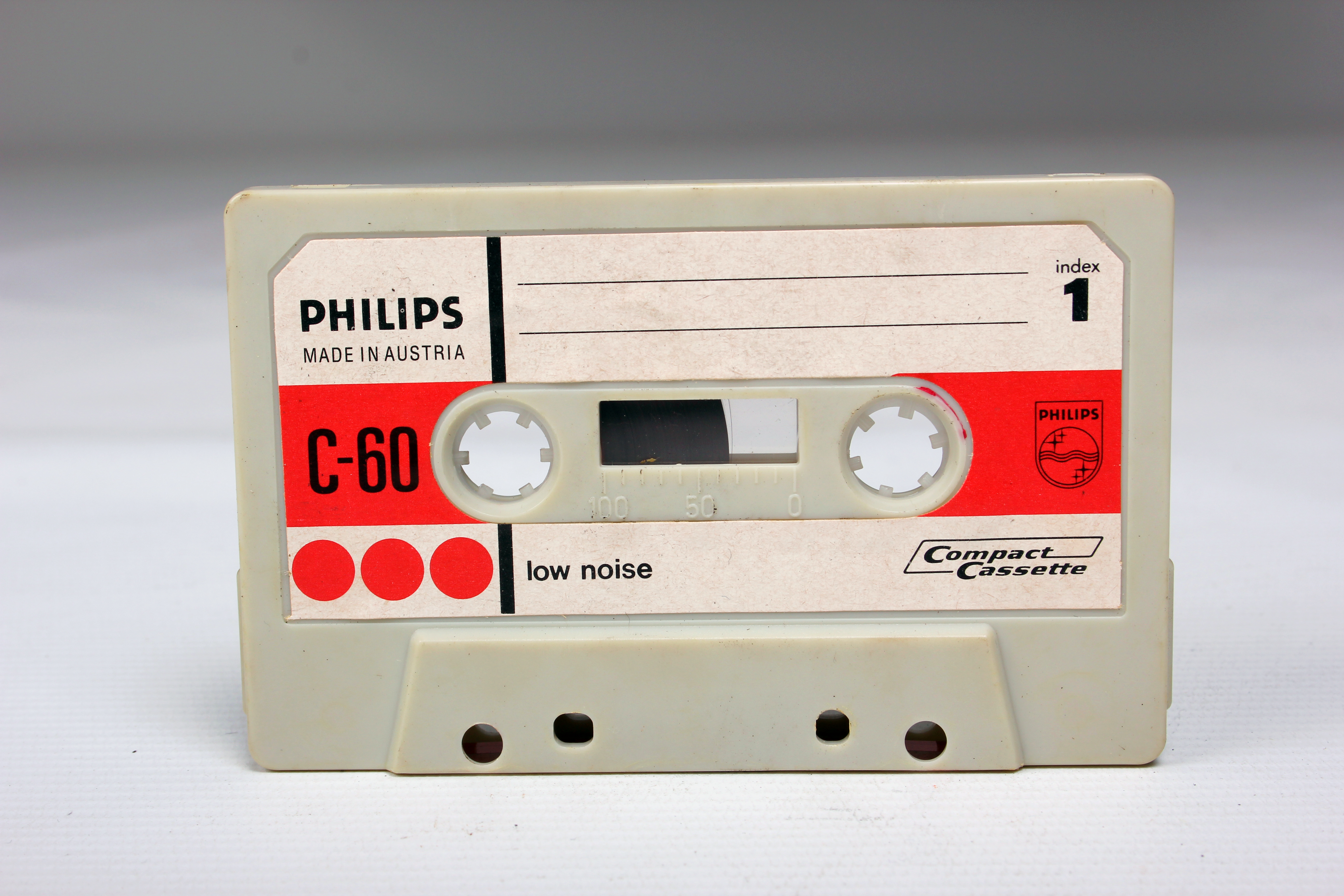
The Compact Cassette, typical medium for audio letters

An audio letter is an audio recording sent by postal mail to a recipient. The practice was more common when charges for long-distance telephone services were higher and before the widespread use of the Internet.

Discovered audio recordings offer a unique perspective into that time period and have often been used to present historical context in modern-day radio and television programs.

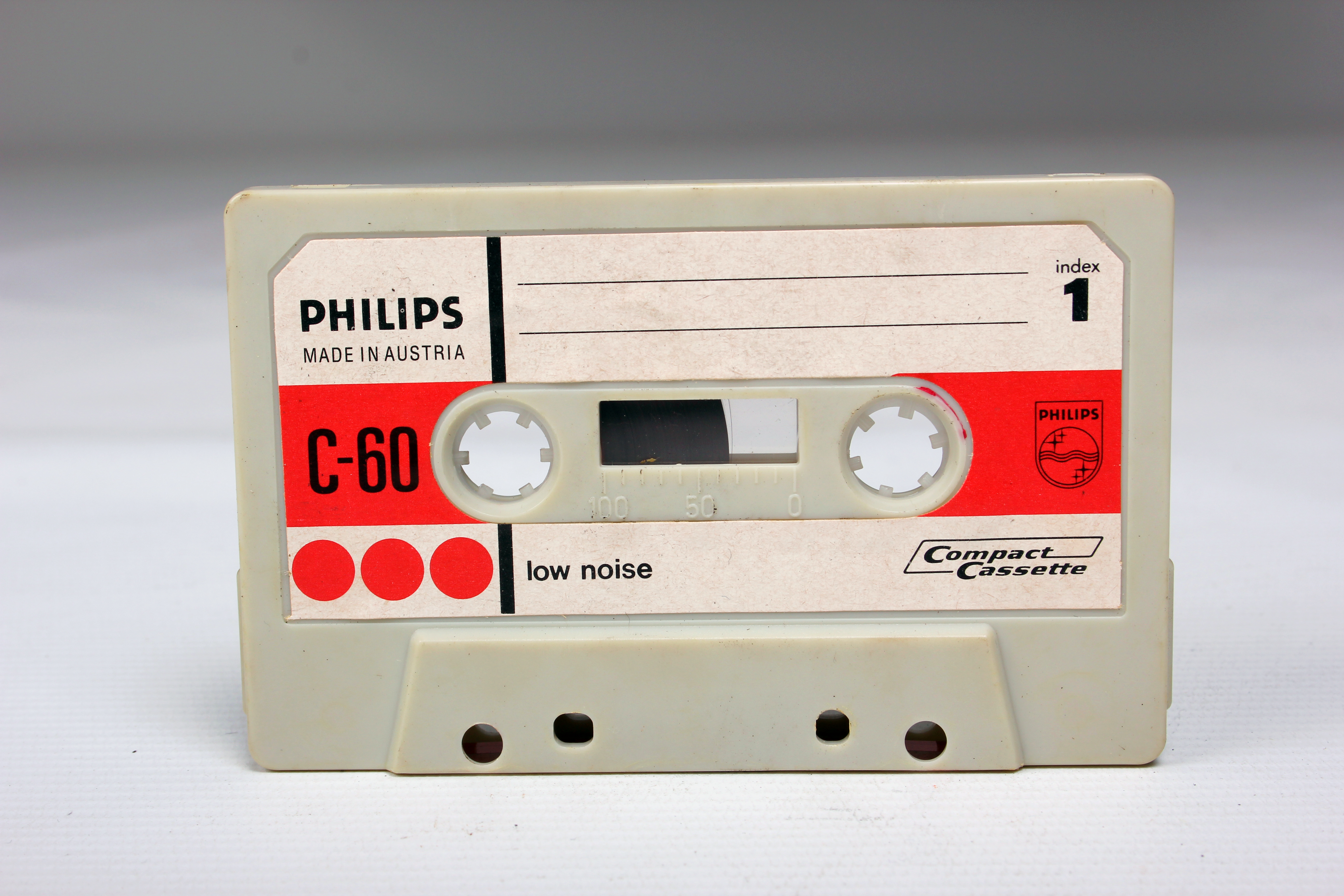
The Compact Cassette, typical medium for audio letters

An audio letter is an audio recording sent by postal mail to a recipient. The practice was more common when charges for long-distance telephone services were higher and before the widespread use of the Internet. There used to be dedicated booths where such recordings could be recorded on a small flexible phonograph disc for mailing for a small fee.

Discovered audio recordings offer a unique perspective into that time period and have often been used to present historical context in modern-day radio and television programs.

== Media ==
Media used in recording audio letters include:

- Wax cylinder
- Reel to reel
- Cassette tape
- MiniDisc
