= Poynings (disambiguation) =

Poynings is a village and civil parish in West Sussex, England, UK.

Poynings may also refer to the following English people:

- Baron Poynings, title in the Peerage of England, 1337–1489 and 1545
- Sir Adrian Poynings (c.1512–1571), military commander and administrator
- Sir Edward Poynings (1459–1521) soldier, administrator, diplomat, and Lord Deputy of Ireland
- Sir Robert Poynings (c.1419–1461), Yorkist in the Wars of the Roses
- Poynings Heron (1548–1595), commander during the Spanish Armada
- Sir Poynings More, 1st baronet (1606–1649), MP

== See also ==
- Poynings' Law (disambiguation), various laws passed by the Parliament of Ireland summoned by Edward Poynings in 1494–5
