= Robert Poynings =

Sir Robert Poynings
- Born: c.1419
- Died: 17 February 1461; St Albans
- Spouse: Elizabeth Paston
- Issue: Sir Edward Poynings
- Father: Robert Poynings, 4th Baron Poynings
- Mother: Eleanor Grey

Sir Robert Poynings (c.1419 – 17 February 1461), was the second son of Robert Poynings, 4th Baron Poynings (1382–1446). He joined the rebellion of Jack Cade in 1450, and was slain fighting on the Yorkist side at the Second Battle of St Albans in 1461.

== Family ==
Robert Poynings was the second son of Robert Poynings, 4th Baron Poynings (1382 – 2 October 1446), by his first wife Eleanor Grey, the daughter of Reginald Grey, 3rd Baron Grey de Ruthyn, and Margaret Roos (or Ros). By his father's first marriage, he had an elder brother, Sir Richard Poynings (d. 10 June 1429), slain near Orleans in France, and a younger brother, Edward Poynings (d.1484), Master of Trinity College in Arundel, Sussex, and rector of North Cray, Kent.

By his father's second marriage to Margaret Squery (d. 3 November 1448), elder daughter of Thomas Squery of Westerham, Kent and widow of William Cromer (d. January 1434), Lord Mayor of London, Robert Poynings had a half sister, Eleanor Poynings, who married Thomas Palmer.

== Career ==
The 4th Baron had settled the manors of Tirlingham, Newington, Eastwell and Westwood in Kent on his granddaughter, Eleanor Poynings (1428–1484), wife of Henry Percy, 3rd Earl of Northumberland, and daughter of Robert Poynings' elder brother, Sir Richard Poynings, by his second wife, Eleanor Berkeley. Robert Poynings claimed these manors against Eleanor 'as heir by gavelkind', claiming, as well, the manor of Great Perching in Sussex. He also claimed the 4th Baron's moveable goods against William Cromer, son of Margaret Squery by her first husband, Sir William Cromer.

In the summer of 1450, Poynings joined the rebel Jack Cade, and is said to have acted as Cade's 'carver and sword-bearer'. He was imprisoned and outlawed as a result, despite which he was elected a Member of Parliament for Sussex in 1450 and 1451. In 1457, he sued a pardon for his participation in Cade's rebellion.

Poynings was slain on 17 February 1461 while fighting on the Yorkist side at the Second Battle of St Albans.

== Marriage and issue ==
In 1458 he married Elizabeth Paston (1 July 1429 – 1 February 1488), the daughter of William Paston, by whom he had an only son, Sir Edward Poynings, who married Elizabeth Scott (d. 15 August 1528), daughter of Sir John Scott (d.1485), and who also fathered seven illegitimate children by several mistresses, including Thomas Poynings, 1st Baron Poynings, and Sir Adrian Poynings.

After Poynings' death his widow married Sir George Browne of Betchworth Castle, Surrey, (beheaded on Tower Hill 4 December 1483), by whom she had two sons, Sir Matthew Browne (d. 6 August 1557), who married Frideswide Guildford, daughter of Richard Guildford, and George, and a daughter, Mary.
