= Adrian Poynings =

16th-century military commander and administrator

Sir Adrian Poynings
- Born: c. 1512; Ghent, Flanders
- Died: 15 February 1571 (aged 58–59)
- Spouse: Mary West
- Issue: Elizabeth Poynings; Mary Poynings; Anne Poynings
- Father: Sir Edward Poynings
- Mother: Rose Whethill

Sir Adrian Poynings (c. 1512 – 15 February 1571) was a military commander and administrator. The youngest of the illegitimate children of Sir Edward Poynings, he played a prominent role in the defence of the English garrison at Le Havre in 1562–63.

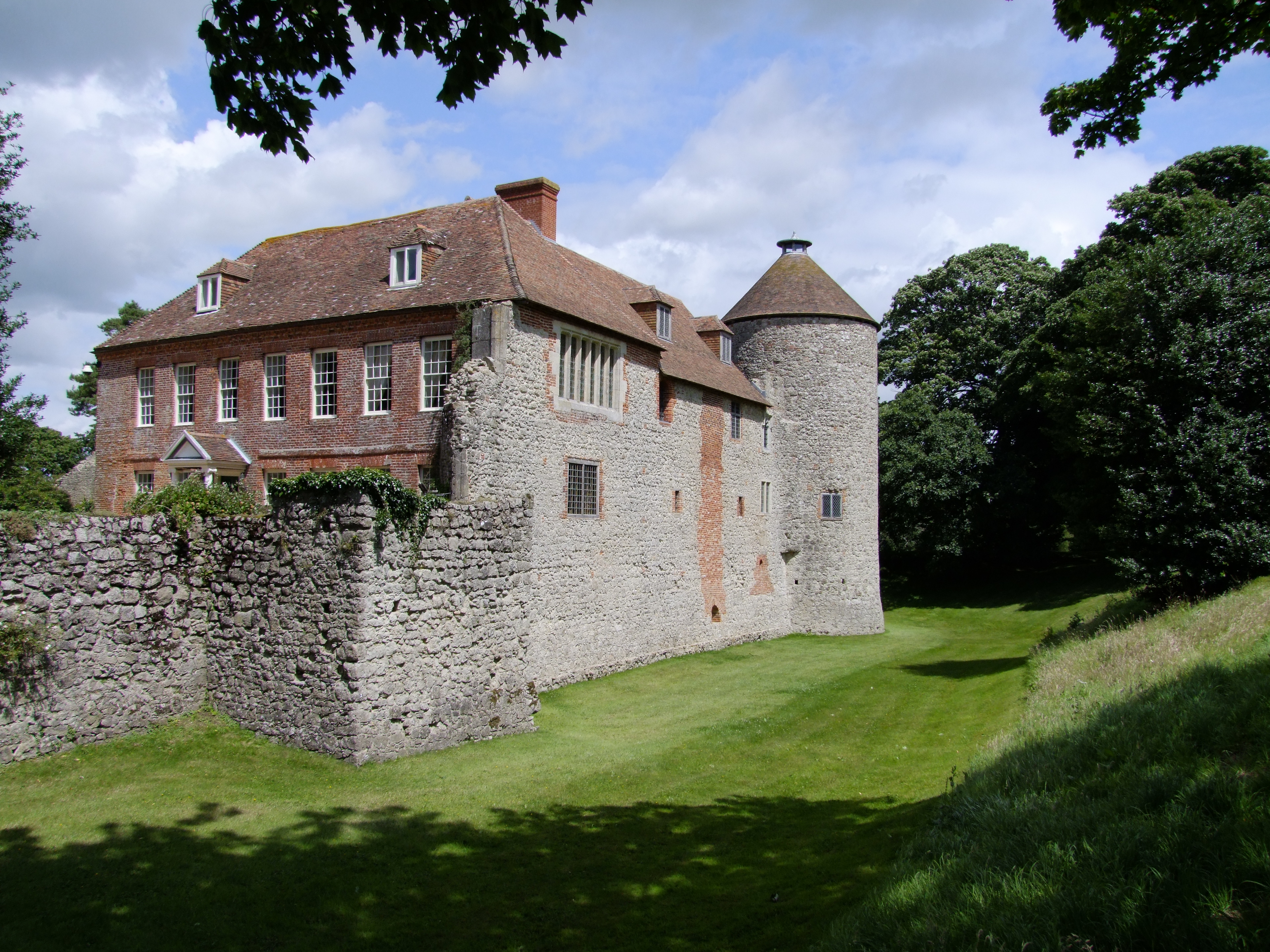
Westenhanger Castle today, once the home of the Poynings family

== Family ==
Adrian Poynings, born about 1512 in Ghent, Flanders, where his father was serving as ambassador to the Emperor Maximilian, was the youngest of seven illegitimate children of Sir Edward Poynings (1459–1521) of Westenhanger Castle, Kent, by several mistresses, one of whom, Rose Whethill, daughter of Adrian Whethill (1415-1503/04) of Calais and Margaret Worsley (d. 13 December 1505), is generally considered to have been Adrian Poynings' mother.

He had two elder brothers, Thomas Poynings, 1st Baron Poynings (d. 1545), and Edward Poynings (d. 1546), and four sisters: Jane (or Joan) Poynings, who married, firstly, Thomas Clinton, 8th Baron Clinton (d. 1517), by whom she was the mother of Edward Clinton, 1st Earl of Lincoln (d. 1585), Lord Admiral of England, and secondly, as his second wife, Sir Robert Wingfield (d. 1539), by whom she had no issue; Margaret Poynings, who married Edward Barry or Barre of Sevington; Mary Poynings, who married Sir Thomas Wilsford or Wilford; and Rose Poynings (born 1505), who married a husband surnamed Lewknor.

By his father's marriage to Isabel or Elizabeth Scott (d. 15 August 1528), daughter of Sir John Scott (d. 1485), Marshal of Calais, and sister of Sir William Scott, Lord Warden of the Cinque Ports, he had a half-brother, John Poynings, who died young. His stepmother, Elizabeth Scott, was buried in Brabourne church, where she is commemorated by a brass.

== Career ==
Poynings was enrolled at Gray's Inn in 1533. His military service began during the Boulogne campaign of 1546. His brother, Edward, captain of the guard at Boulogne, was killed in action in January, and replaced by Thomas Wyatt, whose lieutenant Poynings became in February. In June 1546 he was appointed captain of the citadel at Boulogne, and a year later, captain of the town. His nephew, Lord Clinton, became governor of Boulogne in 1548, and Poynings continued to serve there until the town was returned to the French in 1550.

In 1552, he was appointed lieutenant of the castle of Calais, and, in 1557, was present, with 48-foot soldiers, at the Battle of St. Quentin. He was knighted by Queen Elizabeth no later than 1562, and was Member of Parliament for Tregony in 1559. On 1 December 1560, he was appointed captain of Portsmouth, a position he held until his death. During the English occupation of Le Havre, then known to the English as Newhaven, in 1562, he was appointed high marshal, and since the overall commander, Ambrose Dudley, 3rd Earl of Warwick, 'lacked experience, he was directed by the privy council to be instructed by his marshal'. Poynings' orders for the conduct of the English forces at Newhaven included strictures such as "Any English who shall draw his weapon or fight without the town shall lose his right hand. Any soldier that gives a blow within the town shall lose his hand."

In late November 1562, Sir Hugh Paulet replaced Poynings at Newhaven, although he continued to serve on the military council. On 25 March 1563, he was directed to return to London to report to the Privy Council, and while he was there, the garrison at Newhaven under Warwick surrendered on 27 July. As a reward for his services he was granted denization in 1564.

Poynings' wife, Mary West, was coheir to the barony of West after the death of her half-brother, Thomas West, 9th Baron De La Warr, and eventually sole heiress to her sister, Anne West. In 1567, Poynings unsuccessfully claimed the other title held by the West family, the barony of De La Warr, in right of his wife.

Poynings' final years were spent as captain at Portsmouth, where he is said to have quarrelled with the mayor and burgesses, 'who accused him of high-handedness and violence'.

== Death ==
Poynings died 15 February 1571, and was buried at St Benet, Paul's Wharf, London. Administration of his estate was granted to his widow on 22 February. She was also granted the wardship of their three daughters.

== Marriage and issue ==
Poynings married Mary West, daughter of Sir Owen West (d. 18 July 1551) of Wherwell, Hampshire, eldest son of Thomas West, 8th Baron De La Warr, by his third wife, Eleanor Copley, by whom he had three daughters:

- Elizabeth Poynings, who married Andrew Rogers.
- Mary Poynings, who married Sir Edward More (d. 1623) of Odiham, Hampshire. After her death, More married Frances Brooke (born 12 January 1562), widow of John Stourton, 9th Baron Stourton (1553–1588), and one of the twin daughters of William Brooke, 10th Baron Cobham (1527–1597), by whom he had a daughter, Frances More (1598–1633), who married Sir William Stourton.
- Anne Poynings, who married, as his first wife, Sir George More of Loseley Park, Surrey, by whom she was the mother of Anne More, who married the poet John Donne.

After Poynings' death his widow married Sir Richard Rogers (c.1527–c.1605) of Bryanston, Dorset, son and heir of Sir John Rogers of Bryanston by Katherine Weston, daughter of Sir Richard Weston, by whom she had one son.
