= Poynings' Law =

Poynings' Law or the Statute of Drogheda may refer to the following acts of the Parliament of Ireland:

- The acts of Poynings' Parliament, summoned to Drogheda in 1494–5 by Edward Poynings; or more specifically
  - Poynings' Law (on certification of acts), regulated the procedure for passing bills until the Constitution of 1782
  - Poynings' Law (confirmation of English statutes), imported to Ireland many prior acts of the Parliament of England

== See also ==
- Poynings (disambiguation)
