= William Scott (Lord Warden) =

English politician

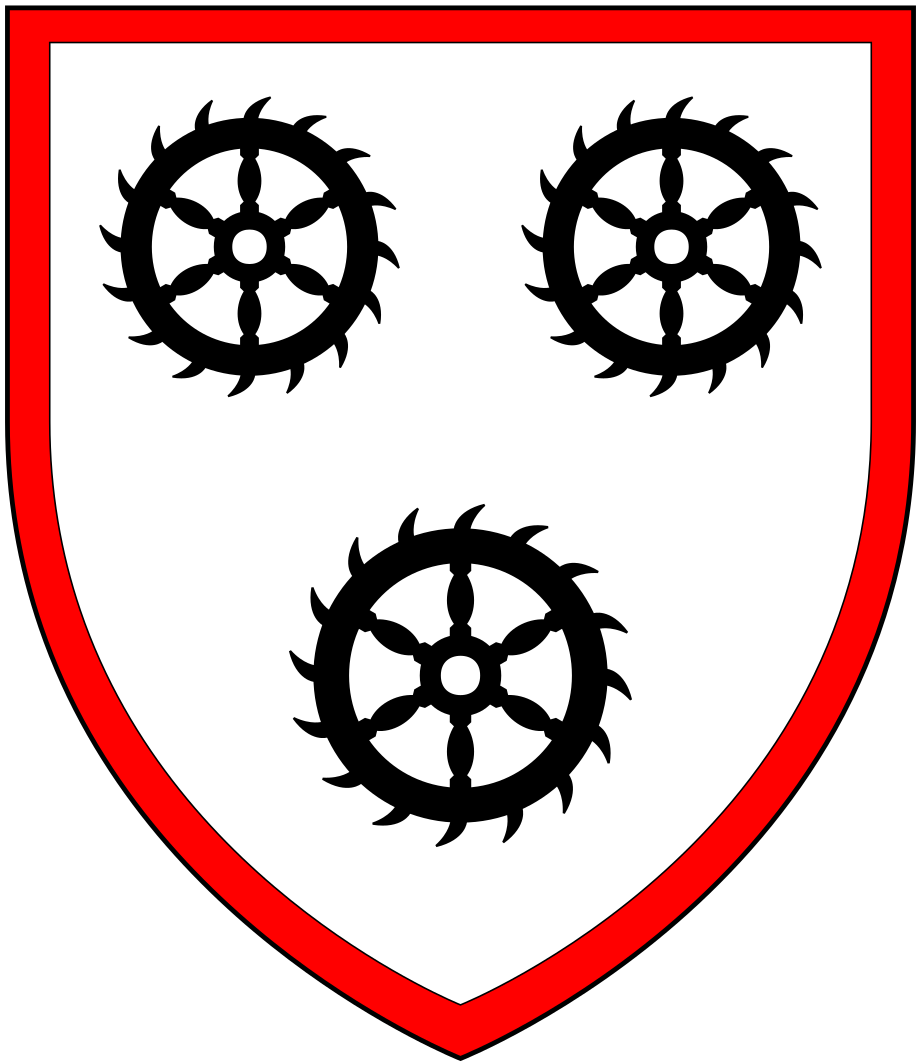
- Arms of Scott: Argent, three Catherine Wheels sable a bordure gules
- Died: Brabourne, England
- Occupation: Lord Warden of the Cinque Ports
- Spouse: Sibyl Lewknor
- Children: Sir John Scott, Edward Scott of The Moat, Anne Scott, Katherine Scott, Joan Scott, Thomas Scott
- Parents: Sir John Scott (father); Agnes Beaufitz (mother)

Sir William Scott of Scot's Hall in Smeeth, Kent (1459 – 24 August 1524) was Lord Warden of the Cinque Ports.

== Family ==
William Scott was the son of Sir John Scott and Agnes Beaufitz, daughter and co-heiress of William Beaufitz. His sister, Elizabeth Scott (d. 15 August 1528), married Sir Edward Poynings.

== Career ==
Scott rose to favour following the seizure of the throne by Henry VII. Within a few years he had been appointed to the Privy Council, appointed Comptroller of the Household and in 1489 was created a Companion of the Bath at the same ceremony as Prince Arthur. He served as High Sheriff of Kent in 1491, 1501 and 1510, and was also to become Constable of Dover Castle, Marshal of Calais (1490-1) and Lord Warden of the Cinque Ports (1492–1493). He remained in favour under Henry VIII, being present at the famous meeting at the Field of the Cloth of Gold in 1520 and one of the deputation sent to greet Emperor Charles V when he landed at Dover in 1522.

Scott inherited the manor of Brabourne in 1495, and had Scot's Hall elaborately rebuilt so that it came to be regarded as one of the foremost houses in Kent.

He was buried at Brabourne, where there is a memorial brass to him in the Scott chapel in St Mary's church.

== Marriage and issue ==
Arms of Lewknor: Azure, three chevrons argent

Scott married Sibyl Lewknor, the daughter of Sir Thomas Lewknor (d. 20 July 1484) of Trotton, Sussex, and Katherine Pelham (d.1481), widow of John Bramshott (d.1468), and daughter of Sir John Pelham, Chamberlain to Catherine of Valois, by whom he had two sons and four daughters:

- Sir John Scott (d. 7 October 1533), who married Anne Pympe, daughter and heiress of Sir Reynold Pympe, esquire, of Nettlestead, Kent, by Elizabeth or Isabel Pashley, daughter of John Pashley, esquire, by whom he had five sons and seven daughters.
- Edward Scott of The Moat, Sussex, who married Alice Fogge, daughter and co-heiress of Thomas Fogge, sergeant porter of Calais. After Scott's death his widow married Sir Robert Oxenbridge.
- Anne Scott, who married Sir Edward Boughton.
- Katherine Scott.
- Elizabeth Scott.
- Joan Scott, who married Thomas Yeard
- Thomas Scott

== Notes ==
Preceded by Philip Fitz Lewes	Lord Warden of the Cinque Ports; 1492–1493	Succeeded by The Prince Henry
