= George Browne (died 1483) =

Sir George Browne
- Born: 1440
- Died: 4 December 1483 (aged 42–43); Tower of London
- Buried: Blackfriars, London
- Spouse: Elizabeth Paston
- Issue: Sir Matthew Browne; George Browne; Mary Browne
- Father: Sir Thomas Browne
- Mother: Eleanor Arundel

Sir George Browne (1440 – 4 December 1483) was an English politician. He was the eldest surviving son and heir of Sir Thomas Browne, beheaded 20 July 1460. He took part in Buckingham's rebellion, and was beheaded on Tower Hill on 4 December 1483.

== Family ==
George Browne was the second but eldest surviving son of Sir Thomas Browne of Betchworth Castle, Surrey, and Eleanor FitzAlan, the daughter of Thomas Fitzalan. By his mother's first marriage, he had six brothers, including Sir Anthony Browne, and two sisters. After his father's death, his mother married Sir Thomas Vaughan who was executed at Pontefract on 25 June 1483 (along with Anthony Woodville, 2nd Earl Rivers and Sir Richard Grey).

== Career ==
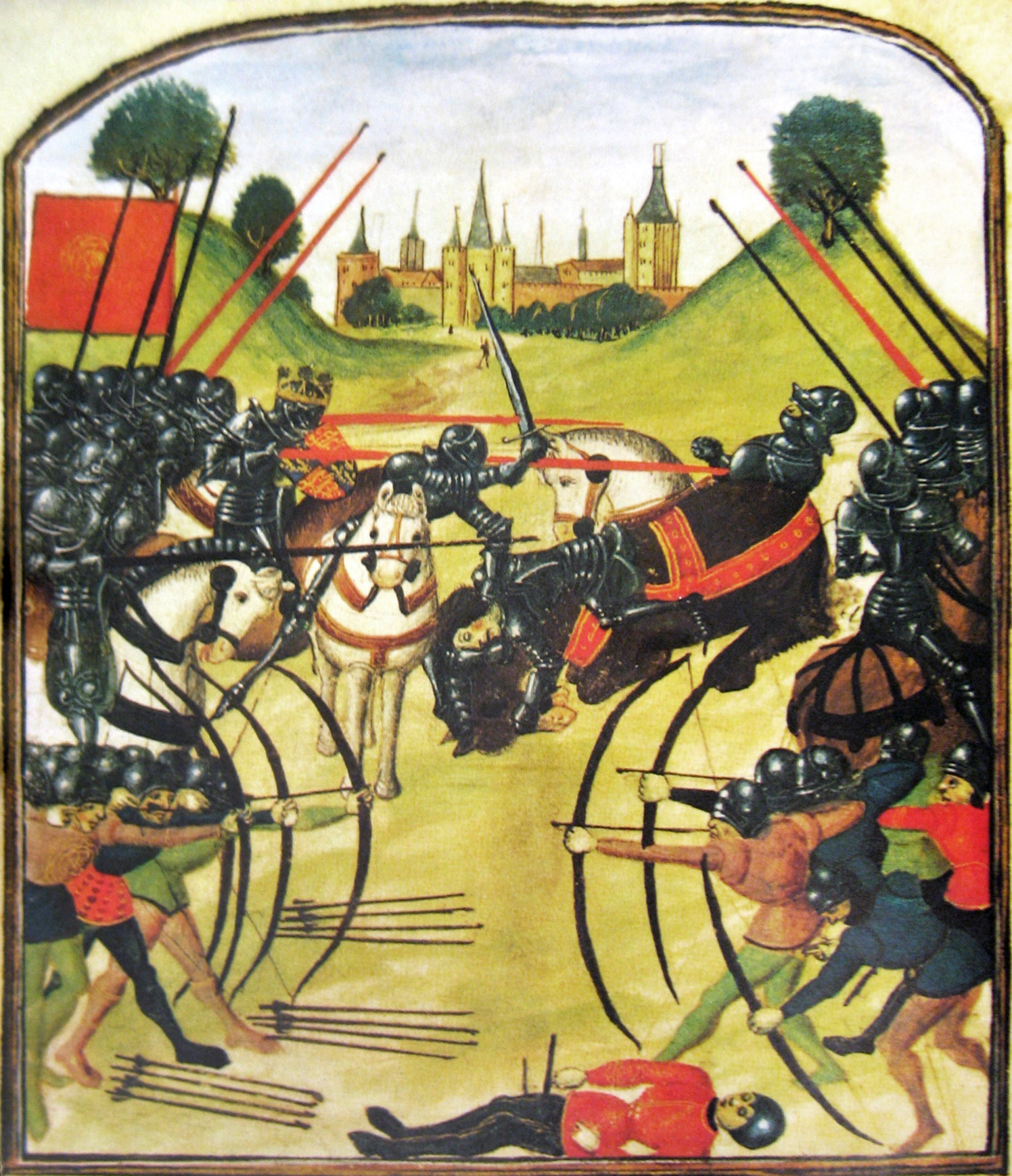
Depiction of the Battle of Tewkesbury, after which George Browne was knighted.

On 30 September 1460, two months after his father's execution, Browne was granted a pardon by the Yorkists, and in 1470 was arrested with George Plantagenet, 1st Duke of Clarence, and Richard Neville, 16th Earl of Warwick. He fought at the Battle of Tewkesbury on 4 May 1471, and was knighted after the battle by the Duke of Clarence.

He was elected a member of parliament for Guildford in 1472 and for Canterbury in 1483. In 1478 he was Knight of the Shire for Surrey, and in 1480 Sheriff of Kent.

In 1472, he surrendered his title and the Manor of Tong to Cecily Neville, Duchess of York.

An undated letter in Browne's hand to John Paston, esquire, containing the cryptic message 'It shall never come out for me', survives among the Paston Letters.

By 1483 he had switched his allegiance to the future Henry VII, and with a force in Kent took part in the rebellion by Henry Stafford, 2nd Duke of Buckingham, against Richard III. According to Speed:

Another commotion at the same time was in Kent, where George Browne and John Guildford, knights, Fogge, Scot, Clifford and Bonting, with five thousand men attempted great matters at Gravesend, but hearing of the Duke of Buckingham's surprise, dispersed themselves for that time....whereupon those that lately fled England were indicted of treason, and other of Henry's factions beheaded, whereof Sir George Browne and Sir Roger Clifford, knights, with four others were beheaded at London, and at Exeter for the like cause died Sir Thomas Sentleger, who had married Lady Anne, Duchess of Exeter, King Richard's own sister, with others, so jealous was the king of his usurped crown.

Browne was beheaded on Tower Hill on 4 December 1483, and buried at the Blackfriars, London. His widow left a will, proved 26 June 1488, in which she asked to be buried at the Blackfriars with her husband.

== Marriage and issue ==
In 1471 Browne married Elizabeth Paston (1 July 1429 – 1 February 1488), widow of Sir Robert Poynings (slain at the Second Battle of St Albans on 17 February 1461), and daughter of William Paston, Justice of the Common Pleas, and Agnes Berry. By her first marriage she had an only son, Sir Edward Poynings.

By Elizabeth Paston, Browne had two sons and a daughter:

- Sir Matthew Browne (d. 6 August 1557), who married Frideswide Guildford, daughter of Richard Guildford, by whom he had eight sons and six daughters.
- George Browne.
- Mary Browne, who married a husband surnamed Bradbridge (or Benbridge).
