= John Scott (died 1485) =

English Yorkist landowner in Kent

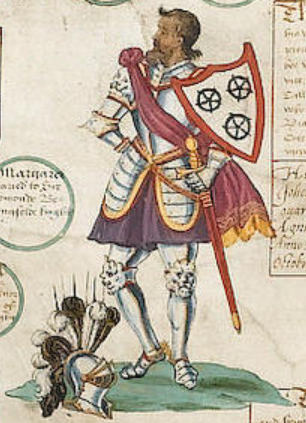
Sir John Scott (died 1485), detail from a family pedigree commissioned c.1615 by his descendant Sir John Scott (1570–1616)

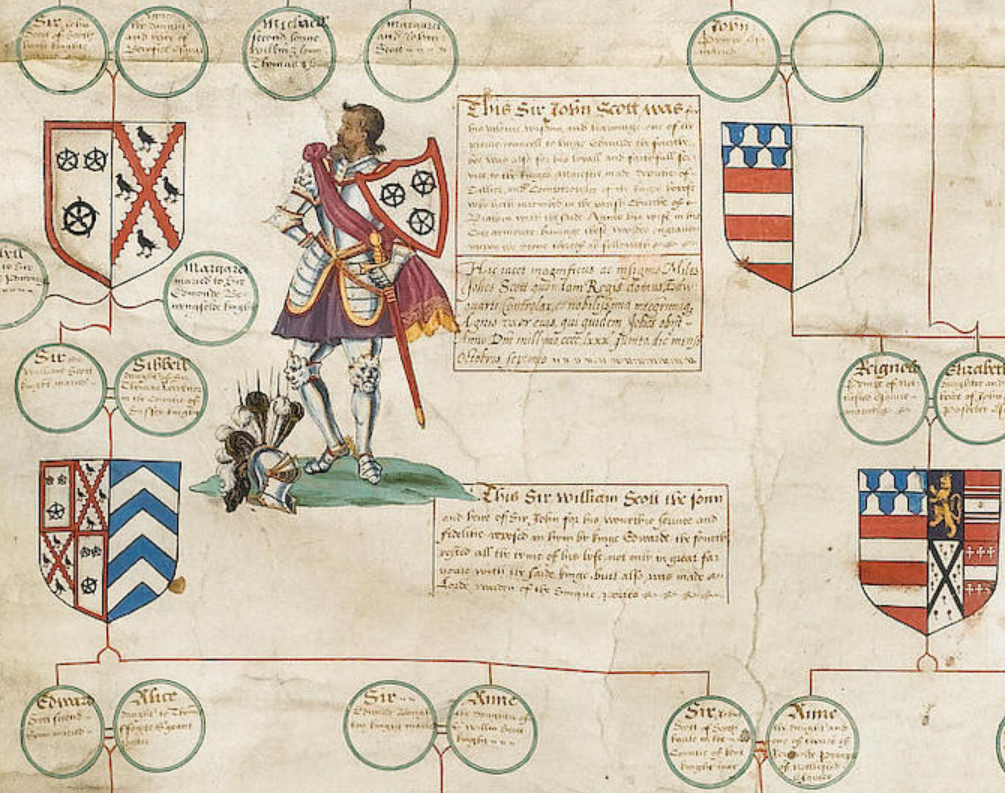
Sir John Scott (died 1485), detail from a family pedigree commissioned c.1615 by his descendant Sir John Scott (1570–1616). The shield at top left displays Scott impaling Beaufitz, representing his marriage. The shield below shows Scott impaling Lewknor, for his son's marriage. The two arms at far right are Pympe (Gules, two bars argent a chief vair), which features lower in the pedigree

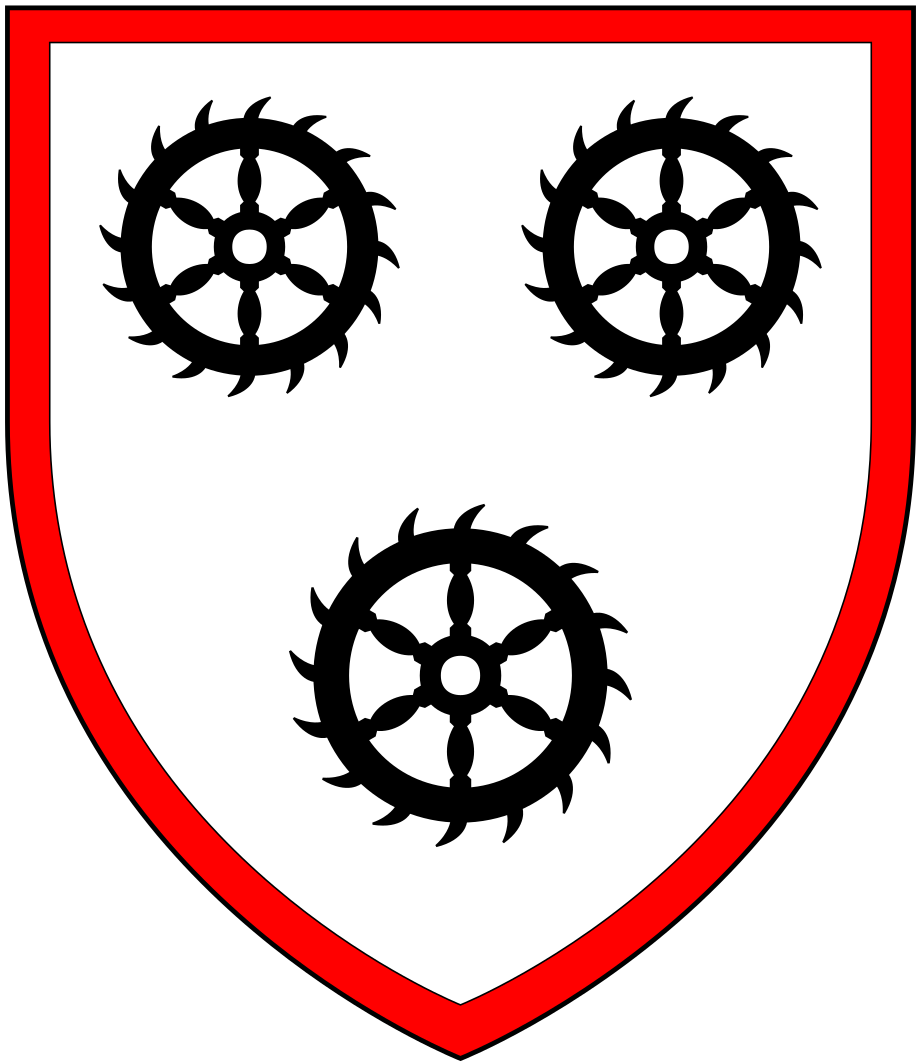
Arms of Scott: Argent, three Catherine Wheels sable a bordure gules

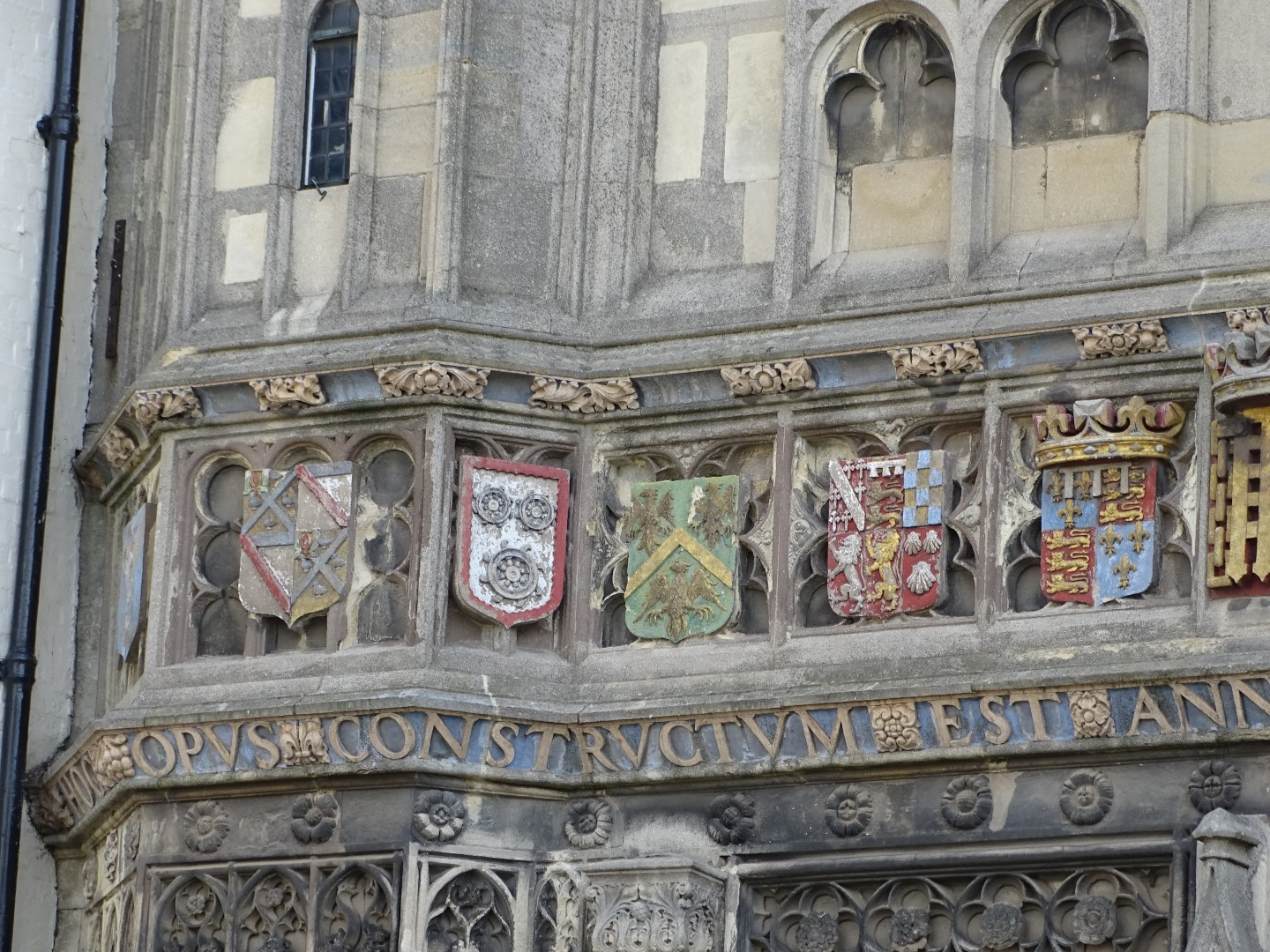
Arms of Sir John Scott (d.1485), Christchurch Gate, Buttermarket, Canterbury Cathedral. He was Sheriff of Kent in 1460.

Sir John Scott, JP (c. 1423 – 17 October 1485) of Scot's Hall in Smeeth was a Kent landowner, and committed supporter of the House of York. Among other offices, he served as Comptroller of the Household to Edward IV, and lieutenant to the Lord Warden of the Cinque Ports.

== Family ==
John Scott was the son of William Scott (d. 1434) and Isabel Finch (died c. 1457), of Netherfield, Sussex. Following his father's death, his mother Isabel married Sir Gervase Clifton as his first wife.

He had a younger brother, William Scott (1428(?) – 1491), who married a wife named Margery, by whom he had six sons and two daughters, and was founder of the Essex branch of the Scott family.

He also had a sister, Joan Scott (d. 1507), who married firstly Thomas Yarde of Denton Court, Kent and secondly Sir Henry Grey of Heton. Joan's daughter, Anne Yarde, married Thomas Heveningham of Suffolk.

== Career ==
Scott was appointed to commissions in Kent from 1450 onwards, and with Sir John Fogge and Robert Horn expended in excess of £333 in the suppression of Jack Cade's uprising in that year. By 1456, he was an esquire of Henry VI. He was appointed a justice of the peace in Kent in 1458, an office that he held until his death, and he was Sheriff of Kent in 1460.

The 'turning point' in Scott's career, according to Fleming, 'came in June 1460, when, with Fogge and Horn, he gave support to the Yorkist earls that proved crucial to their success in Kent'. Within a year of the accession of Edward IV, Scott was rewarded with annuities, a knighthood, the office of tronage and pesage in the port of London, and appointments as joint Chirographer of the Common Pleas, deputy butler of Sandwich, lieutenant of Dover under Richard Neville, 16th Earl of Warwick, 'the Kingmaker', and Comptroller of the Household.

In 1462, as a result of the attainders of John de Vere, 12th Earl of Oxford, and Thomas, 9th Baron Ros of Helmsley (d. 1464), he was granted custody of Oxford's lands, as well as the reversion of lands which were the jointure of Baron Ros's widow, Margery [sic?], including the castle and manor of Chilham and the manors of Wilderton and Molash. In 1463, he was granted the manors of Old Swinford and Snodsbury in Worcestershire, in the hands of the crown by the attainder of the Earl of Wiltshire, and was among those entrusted with supervision of all 'wardships, marriages, and ecclesiastical temporalities' which had fallen to the crown.

In 1466 he purchased the marriage of Sir Edward Poynings, son and heir of Sir Robert Poynings (d.1461), and in the following year was granted custody of Sir Robert Poynings' lands in Kent.

He also served as Chamberlain to Edward, Prince of Wales, and was a member of parliament for Kent in 1467.

In September 1467 he assisted in negotiations for the marriage of Edward IV's sister, Margaret of York, to Charles the Bold, and accompanied Margaret to her wedding in Burgundy in the following year. In November 1467 he negotiated a commercial treaty with Burgundy at Brussels, and from May 1469 to February 1470 was involved in commercial negotiations with the Hanseatic League in Flanders.

By 1471 he was appointed Locum tenens Regis of the Cinque Ports. How long he served or continued to serve in this position is unknown, but we know that William Fitzalan held the position by 1483. By March of that year was Marshal of Calais. In 1473 and 1474 he travelled to Burgundy, Utrecht and Bruges on diplomatic missions.

It seems likely that he went into exile during the readeption, but returned to England to fight at the Battle of Barnet in April 1471, and assist in the suppression of Fauconberg's rebellion in May of that year.

In February 1473 he and others were appointed tutors to Edward IV's son, the Prince of Wales. After Edward IV's death, he was loyal to Richard III, 'at least until the end of 1484'.

Scott died 17 October 1485, and was buried, by his instructions, in the north wall of the chancel of St. Mary's church, Brabourne. He left a will dated 18 October 1485, proved 18 January 1486. His widow had died by 4 July 1487, and was also buried at St Mary's, Brabourne. She left a will dated 25 March 1487.

An uncle, also one 'Sir John Scot of Scott's Hall', born at Brabourne, had been Lieutenant of Dover Castle from 1399 to his death in 1413. He had also served as Member of Parliament for Hythe in Kent from 1384.

== Marriage and issue ==
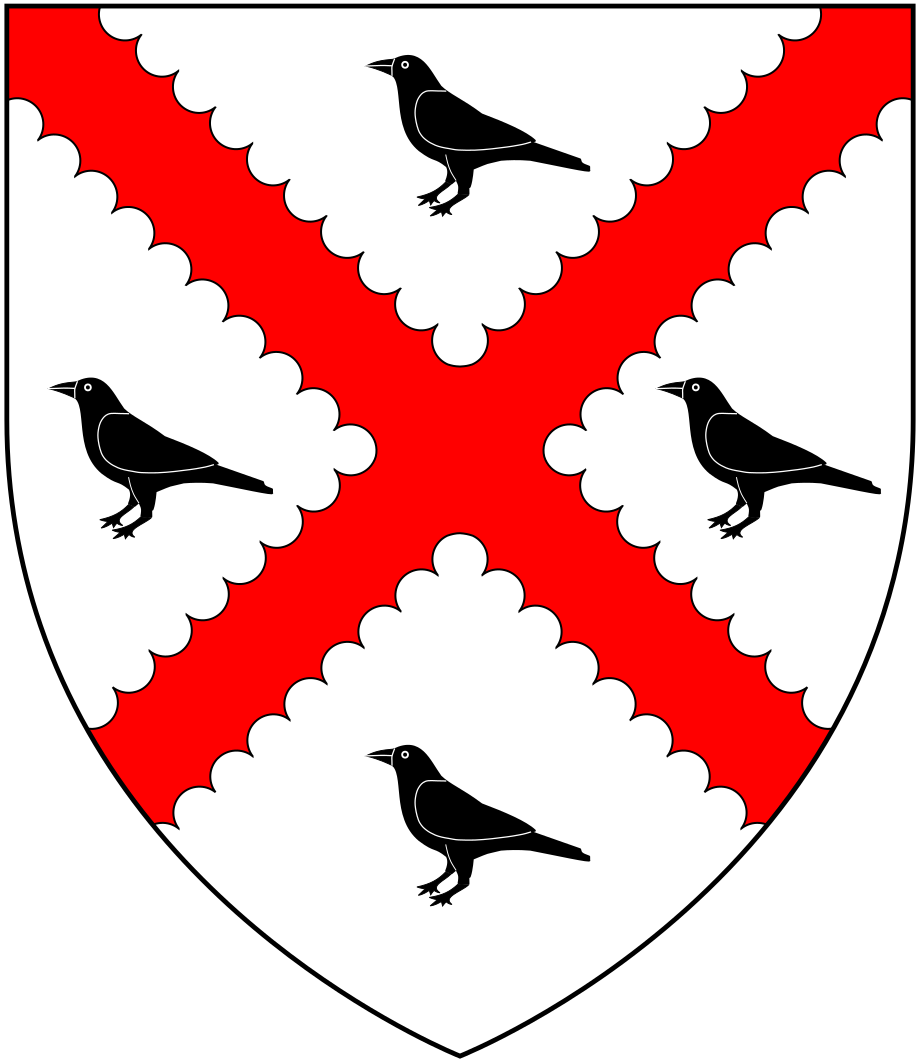
Arms of Beaufitz: Argent, a saltire engrailed gules between four ravens proper

Scott married Agnes Beaufitz (d.1486/7), daughter and co-heiress of William Beaufitz of The Grange, Gillingham, Kent, and likely also a fishmonger of London, by whom he had a son and two daughters:

- Sir William Scott (d. 24 August 1524), who married Sibyl Lewknor.
- Isabel or Elizabeth Scott (d. 15 August 1528), whom Sir John Scott married to his ward, Sir Edward Poynings. There is a memorial brass to her in St Mary's church, Brabourne.
- Margaret Scott (d.1514), who married, as his second wife, Sir Edmund Bedingfield (1443–1496).

From the 16th century onwards Thomas Rotherham, Archbishop of York, was also known by the alternate surname 'Scot', and it has been speculated that he was a younger son of Sir John Scott and Agnes Beaufitz. However this claim is said to have been disproved.

== Notes ==
Preceded by Richard Neville: Vacant? after 1460	Lord Warden of the Cinque Ports; April 1471 ― ?	Succeeded by Vacant? until 1483: William Fitzalan
