= Elizabeth Paston =

Elizabeth Paston (1429 – 1 February 1488) was a member of the English gentry who is regularly referred to in the extensive collection of Paston Letters. She was the only daughter of a Norfolk lawyer, William Paston and Agnes Barry. In her late teens and twenties she resisted marriage to several men proposed by her mother and brothers, before marrying Sir Robert Poynings in 1458, with whom she had a son Edward Poynings.

Following her husband's death at the Second Battle of St Albans in 1461, she spent a period as a widow before marrying George Browne by whom she had two further children. Browne's execution in 1483 following his involvement in a rebellion against Richard III left her a widow again.

== Family ==
Elizabeth Paston, born 1429 in Norfolk, was the middle child and only daughter of William Paston, Justice of the Common Pleas, and Agnes Barry, the daughter and co-heir of Sir Edmund Barry (d. 1433) of Hertfordshire. Elizabeth had four brothers, the eldest of whom, John Paston (died 1466), succeeded her father in 1444 as heir and head of the family.

=== Marriage proposals and marriages ===
By the standards of the time Elizabeth Paston married late; she was nearly 30 when she married in 1458. Her father William had left her £200 towards her marriage in his will, provided that she married according to the advice of her mother and his other executors. Potential marriages had been under discussion from at least the time she was nineteen in 1449 when marriage was proposed with a fifty-year-old widower Stephen Scrope, whose stepfather John Fastolf was John Paston's chief patron.

Elizabeth was being harshly treated at home by her mother, Agnes, who, as her cousin Elizabeth Clere reported in a letter of 1449, beat her regularly. However, her brother John, who was responsible for organising her dowry, was slow to do so. Various suitors were put forward during the 1450s but marriage did not materialise until 1458 when Elizabeth married Robert Poynings, one of the younger sons of a Sussex landowner. It may not have been a love match but within a year she had a son, Edward Poynings. Edward was born in 1459, only months before Robert Poynings was killed fighting on the Yorkist side at the second battle of St Albans.

Elizabeth was left a widow to bring up their son. Edward Poynings was to become a trusted administrator of King Henry VII. In his role as deputy lord lieutenant in Ireland he was responsible for the famous "Poynings' Law" which clearly subordinated the Anglo-Irish and the Irish to the authority of the English parliament.

Elizabeth Poynings (nee Paston) was a widow for over a decade, until she remarried in 1471 to George Browne, landowner of Betchworth in Surrey. With Browne Elizabeth had two further children, a son, Matthew, and a daughter, Mary. Browne was actively involved in politics, both local and national. Twelve years after their marriage George Browne - accompanied by his stepson Edward Poynings - was involved in the unsuccessful rebellion of Henry, Duke of Buckingham against King Richard III in 1483.

Elizabeth's husband was beheaded on Tower Hill in London that December, leaving Elizabeth a widow as a result of political activity during the wars of the roses for the second time. She was not to remarry.

=== Will ===
Elizabeth Browne died in 1488, aged 58 or 59. Her adult life had been dominated and significantly marked by the political activities of both her husbands and also by her elder son Edward. Her extensive will shows that she was a devout widow but also a very wealthy one, with an extensive list of valuables and jewels left to her descendants.

== Sources ==
- Castor, Helen (2005). Blood and Roses: The Paston family in the fifteenth century. London: Faber. ISBN 0571216714. OCLC 58828043.
- Davis, Norman, ed. (1971). The Paston Letters and Papers of the Fifteenth Century, Part I. Oxford: Clarendon Press. ISBN 9780197224212.
- Driver, J. T. (2011). "The Kentish origins and connections of Sir George Brown". Archaeologia Cantiana. OCLC 1481806.
- Ellis, S. G. (2004). "Poynings, Sir Edward (1459–1521)". Oxford Dictionary of National Biography (online ed.). Oxford: Oxford University Press. doi:10.1093/ref:odnb/22683. Archived from the original on 20 April 2018. (Subscription, Wikipedia Library access or UK public library membership required.)
- Fleming, P. (2004). "The Oxford Dictionary of National Biography". Poynings, Michael. Oxford Dictionary of National Biography (online ed.). Oxford: Oxford University Press. doi:10.1093/ref:odnb/22684. Archived from the original on 20 April 2018. (Subscription, Wikipedia Library access or UK public library membership required.)
- Richmond, C. (1990). The Paston family in the fifteenth century: The first phase. Cambridge: Cambridge University Press. ISBN 0521385024. OCLC 20489647.
- Richmond, C. (1996). The Paston family in the fifteenth century: Fastolf's will. NCambridge: Cambridge University Press. ISBN 0521562384. OCLC 42330597.
