= Thomas Poynings, 1st Baron Poynings =

English soldier and courtier

- Born: c.1512
- Died: 17 August 1545; Boulogne
- Spouse: Katherine Marney
- Issue: son Poynings
- Father: Sir Edward Poynings
- Mother: Rose Whethill

Thomas Poynings, 1st Baron Poynings (c.1512 – 17 August 1545) was an English soldier and courtier.

== Family ==
Thomas Poynings was one of seven illegitimate children of Sir Edward Poynings of Westenhanger, Kent. His mother may have been his father's mistress, Rose Whethill, daughter of Adrian Whethill (1415-1503/4) of Calais and Margaret Worsley (d. 13 December 1505). Rose Whethill was left an annuity of 40 marks in Sir Edward's will of 1521.

He had two brothers, Edward Poynings (d.1546) and Sir Adrian Poynings, and four sisters, including Jane (or Joan) Poynings, who married firstly Thomas Clinton, 8th Baron Clinton (d.1517), by whom she was the mother of Edward Clinton, 1st Earl of Lincoln (d.1585), Lord Admiral of England, and secondly, as his second wife, Sir Robert Wingfield (d.1539), by whom she had no issue.

== Career ==
Poynings' wife, Katherine, inherited land in the west country and Poynings began to acquire additional land in Wiltshire, Cornwall and Somerset, as well as exchanging Westenhanger for a grant of monastic land in Dorset (including Bindon Abbey). In the 1540s, he served King Henry VIII as Marshal of Calais and keeper of the castle at Guînes, then took an active role in the invasion of France in 1544, in particular at Montreuil and the sieges of Boulogne.

On 30 January 1545, Poynings was raised to the peerage as Baron Poynings and appointed Lieutenant of Boulogne. He died of dysentery at Boulogne on 17 August 1545.

== Marriage and issue ==
He married Katherine Marney, widow of George Radcliffe, a younger son of Robert Radcliffe, 1st Earl of Sussex, and elder daughter and co-heir of John Marney, 2nd Baron Marney, by whom he had an only son, baptized in March 1539, who died an infant.

== Notes ==
Peerage of England
New creation	Baron Poynings; 1545	Extinct
