= Philip Fitz Lewes =

Lord Warden and Constable of Dover Castle

Lord Warden of the Cinque Ports
- In office 1488–1492

Personal details
- Born: 1430 Possibly London, England
- Died: July 18 ― August, 1492 Likely Kent, England

Philip Fitz Lewes, Philip Fitz-Lewes, or Philip Fitzlewes (c. 1430 ― July 18, 1492) was a 15th-century English Nobelman who served as both the Warden of the Cinque Ports and Constable of Dover Castle from 1488 to 1492 under Henry VII.

== Biography ==
The birthplace of Philip Fitz Lewes seems to have been lost to history but it is more than likely he was born in a major hub in the East of England due to his nobleman status, such as London or Colchester. His father John Fitz Lewis was said to have been a successful man living in London, another major hint of his birthplace. Philip is believed to have had eight siblings, four brothers and four sisters. He married a woman by the surname of Turney in 1483 in Essex of which they had one child, a daughter named Anne.

Much information on Philip's time in said positions can be found in Samuel Statham's The History of the Castle, Town, and Port of Dover from 1899 and the sources listed therein. It is thought that also around 1483 Philip became a deputy at Dover Castle by Richard III under William Fitzalan, whom he would later take his position in possibly late 1487 but confirmed by 1488. The exact date of Philip's death is unknown but it is known to have been after July 18, 1492 as he was ordered by Henry VII to provide fifty-seven ships from the Cinque Ports. It is generally believed that William Scott rose to the position of Lord Warden of the Cinque Ports in August of that year. However, this has not been confirmed and his name does not appear in town records.

Preceded by William Fitzalan	Lord Warden of the Cinque Ports; 1488–1492	Succeeded by William Scott
