= Edward Clinton, 1st Earl of Lincoln =

English peer and landowner (1512 – c. 1585)

The Right Honourable The Earl of Lincoln KG
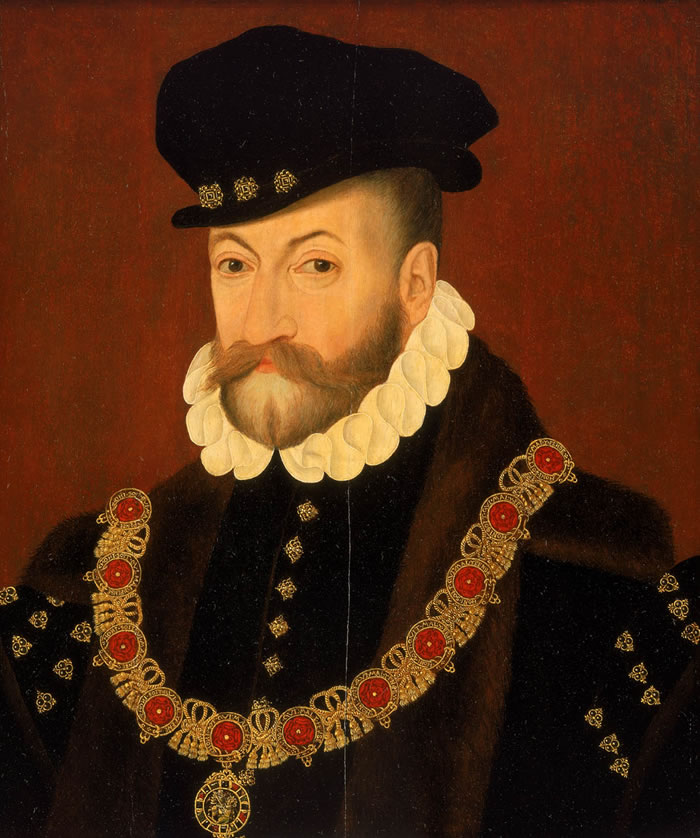

Lord High Admiral
- In office 1550–1554
- Monarchs: Edward VI, Mary I
- Preceded by: The Earl of Warwick
- Succeeded by: The Lord Howard of Effingham

Personal details
- Born: 1512 Manor of Scrivelsby, Lincolnshire, England
- Died: 16 January 1584/85 London, England
- Spouse(s): Elizabeth Blount; Ursula Stourton; Elizabeth FitzGerald
- Children: Henry Clinton, 2nd Earl of Lincoln
- Parents: Thomas Clinton, 8th Baron Clinton (father); Jane Poynings (mother)

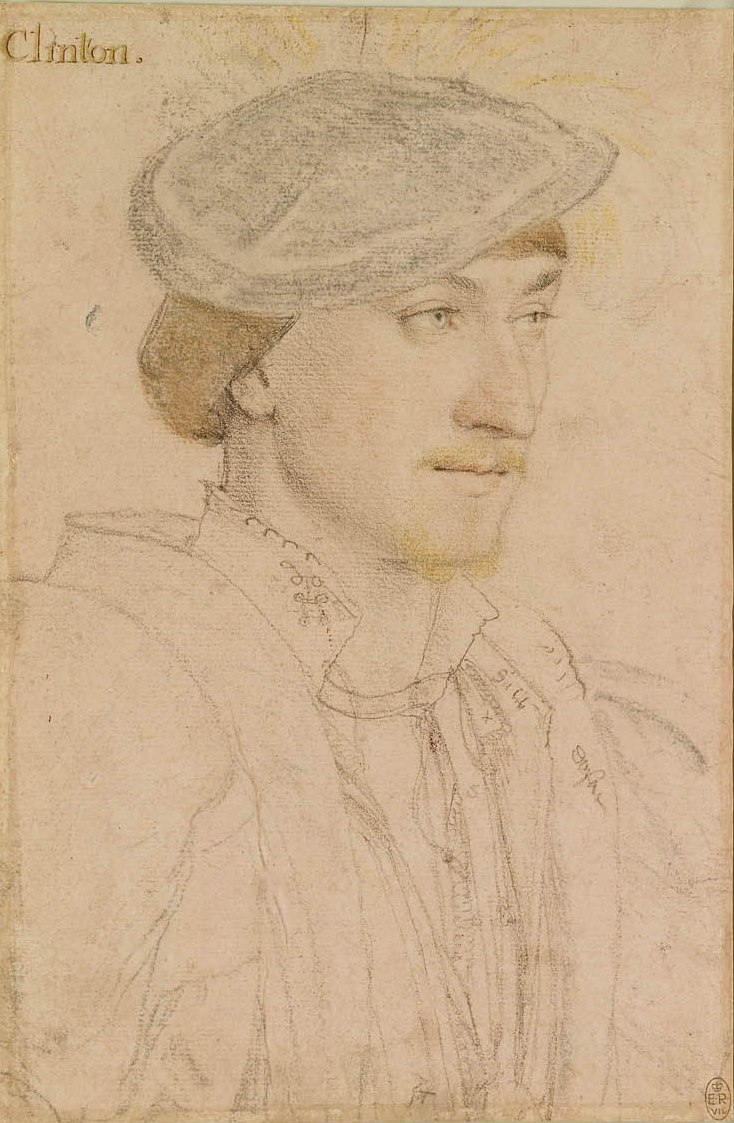
Edward Clinton, Baron Clinton, drawn before his acquisition of the title Earl of Lincoln, by Hans Holbein the Younger, c. 1534–1535. Royal collection, Windsor Castle

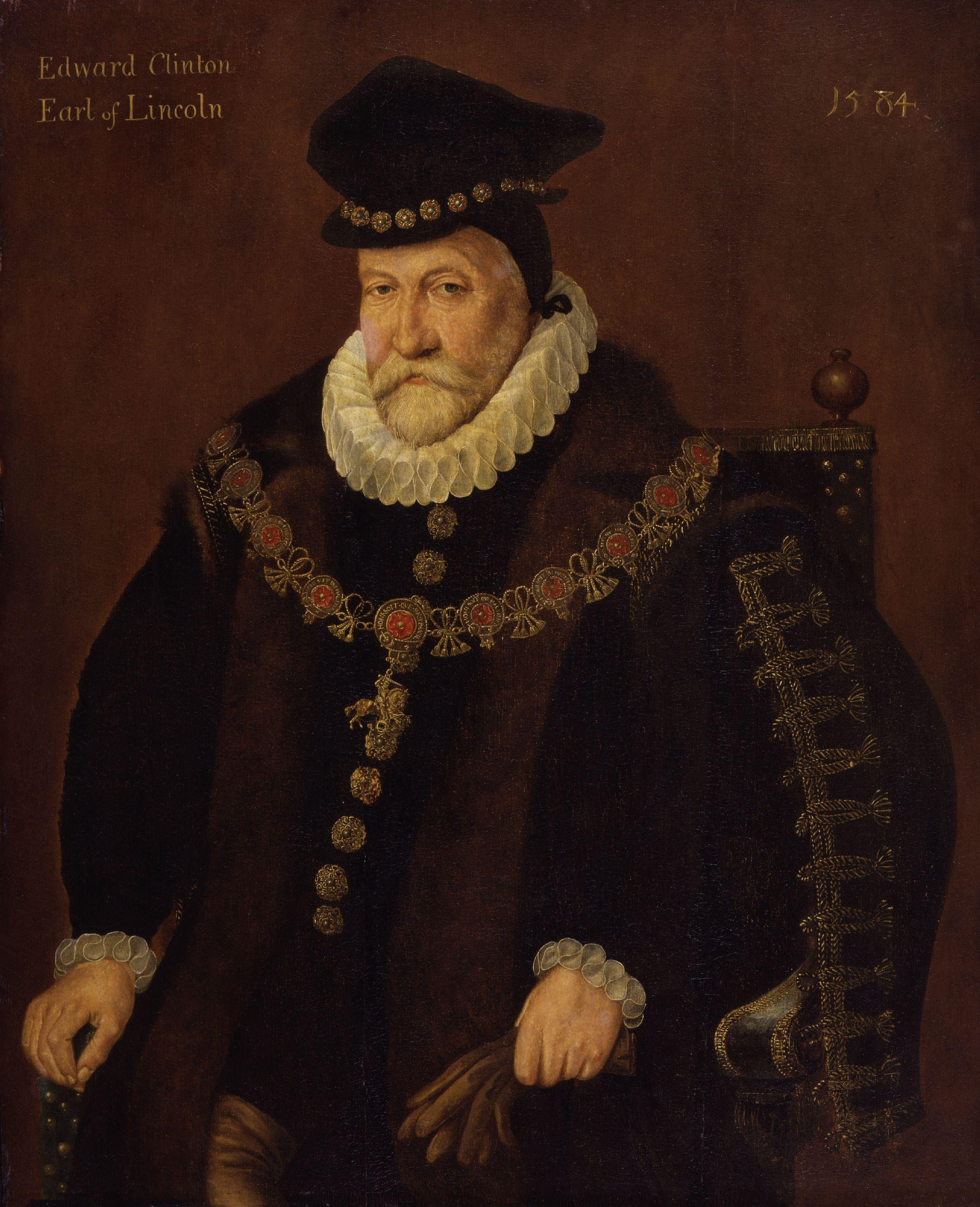
"Edward Clinton, Earl of Lincoln, 1584", portrait by unknown artist, National Portrait Gallery, London, NPG 900

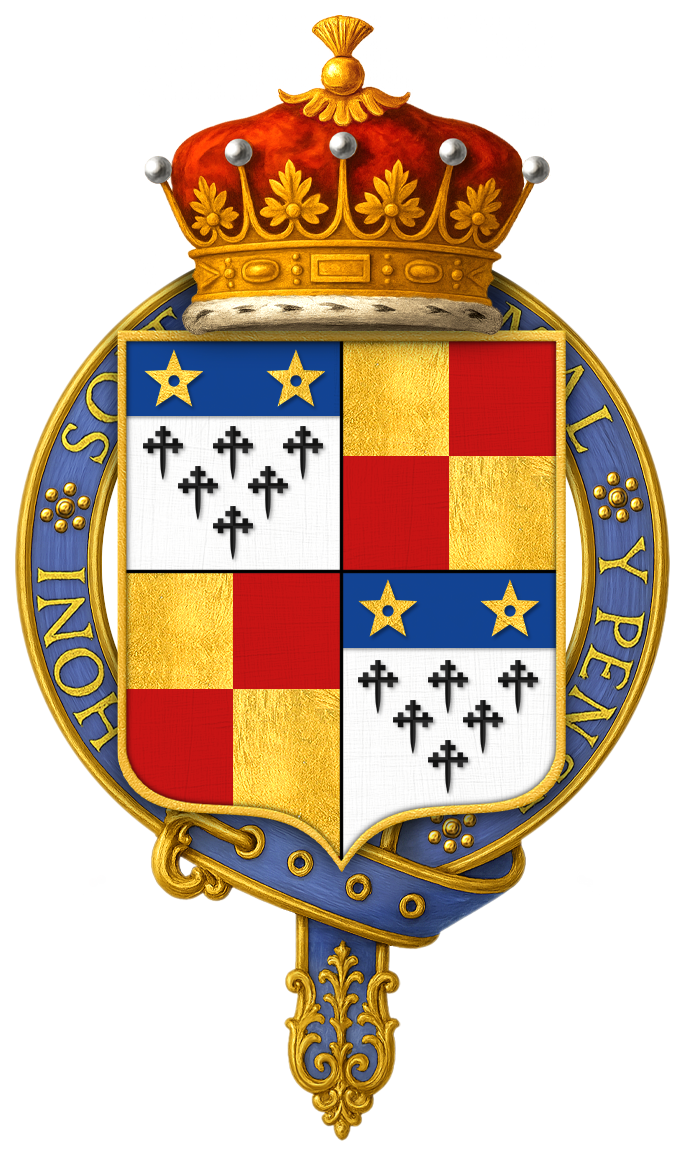
Arms of Edward Clinton, 1st Earl of Lincoln, KG: Quarterly 1st and 4th Argent six crosses crosslet fitchy three two and one Sable on a chief Azure two mullets Or pierced Gules (for Clinton); 2nd and 3rd quarterly Or and Gules (for Saye)

Edward Clinton, 1st Earl of Lincoln, KG (also Edward Fiennes; 1512 – 16 January 1584/85) was an English landowner, peer, and Lord High Admiral. He rendered valuable service to four of the Tudor monarchs.

== Family ==
Edward Clinton, or Fiennes, was born at Scrivelsby in Lincolnshire, the son of Thomas Clinton, 8th Baron Clinton (1490–1517), by Jane (or Joan) Poynings, one of the seven illegitimate children of Sir Edward Poynings (1459–1521) of Westenhanger, Kent. She was the sister of Thomas Poynings, 1st Baron Poynings (died 1545), Edward Poynings (died 1546), and Sir Adrian Poynings. After the death of the 8th Baron Clinton in 1517, Jane Poynings married, as his second wife, Sir Robert Wingfield (died 1539).

Clinton succeeded his father as 9th Baron Clinton in 1517. As he was only five years old when his father died, he was made a royal ward in the Court of Wards and by 1530 had been married to the King's former mistress, the 30-year-old Elizabeth Blount.

== Career ==
=== France ===
Clinton joined the retinue of King Henry VIII at Boulogne and Calais in 1532. He sat in the House of Lords in 1536 and later served in the Royal Navy against French and Scottish naval forces from 1544 to 1547. He was knighted in Edinburgh by Edward Seymour, 1st Earl of Hertford, for his part in the capture of that city in 1544. He also took part in the Siege of Boulogne in September 1544. Under John Dudley, Viscount Lisle, he saw action against the French at the Battle of Spithead in 1545 and was sent as one of the peace commissioners to France the following year.

=== Scotland ===
In August 1547, Clinton was sent to Scotland with a fleet of twelve ships to support the Siege of St Andrews Castle and prevent a French intervention, but he arrived too late. He captured Broughty Castle on 24 September, refortified it with the aid of an Italian military engineer, and installed Andrew Dudley as its captain, leaving him three ships, the Mary Hamborough, the Barque Eger, and the Phoenix.

Clinton commanded the English fleet during the invasion of Scotland by Edward Seymour and provided naval artillery support at the Battle of Pinkie on 15 September 1547. He received instructions to take a fleet to Scotland in May 1548, land troops in Fife to devastate the coastal towns and, if possible, accept the surrender of Perth from the Master of Ruthven. In August 1548, he sailed into the Firth of Forth and scattered French and Scottish ships near Leith. He then landed 500 men to burn the ships in the harbour of Burntisland and contemplated fortifying the harbour for English use. He was aboard the Great Barque.

=== Governor of Boulogne ===
Appointed as Governor of Boulogne in 1547, Clinton successfully defended the city against a French siege from 1549 to 1550. That same year, with Henry Manners, 2nd Earl of Rutland, he was appointed Lord Lieutenant of Lincolnshire and of Nottinghamshire and served as Lord High Admiral under King Edward VI from 1550 to 1553, and again in the reign of Queen Elizabeth I from 1559 to his death in 1585. He was a Privy Counsellor from 1550 to 1553 and briefly served as an envoy to France in 1551. After his appointment as Lord-Lieutenant of Lincolnshire in 1552, Clinton took part in the defeat of Wyatt's Rebellion in Kent in 1554.

He was a commander of the expedition of William Herbert, 1st Earl of Pembroke to support the Spanish forces at the Battle of Saint Quentin in northern France on 10 August 1557, but arrived after the battle was largely won. Upon his return to England, Clinton took command of the English fleet, raided the French coast and in 1558 burnt the town of Le Conquet and the surrounding area.

=== Northern Rebellion and France ===
With Ambrose Dudley, 3rd Earl of Warwick, Clinton was in joint command of a large army during the Northern Rebellion; however, the army was still being assembled when the rebellion was defeated in January 1570. He was created Earl of Lincoln in 1572, and served as ambassador to France. Thomas Smith described his reception in Paris, and a visit to the Tuileries Palace where Charles IX of France showed him gardens designed by Catherine de' Medici. Clinton undertook several commissions from Queen Elizabeth I until his death in London on 16 January 1585. As Lord Admiral he is credited with at least one important reform: setting up a separate Court of Admiralty in Ireland.

In 1541-42 following the dissolution of the monasteries, Clinton and his wife, Ursula, were granted the lands of the earlier Aslackby Preceptory of the Knights Templar—later belonging to the Knights Hospitaller—at Aslackby in Lincolnshire.

== Marriage and children ==
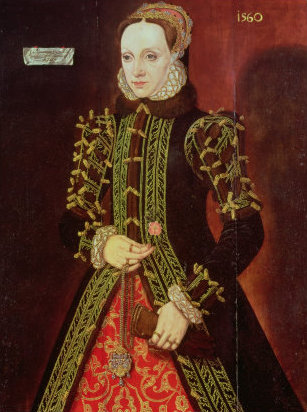
Elizabeth FitzGerald, ("the fair Geraldine") daughter of Gerald FitzGerald, 9th Earl of Kildare, third wife of Lord Clinton

He married three times:

- Firstly to Elizabeth Blount (d. 1539), Henry VIII's former mistress, by whom he produced three daughters:
  - Lady Bridget Clinton (born c. 1536), married Robert Dymoke (Dymock or Dymocke), of Scrivelsby, Lincolnshire, c. 1556 and had ten children. He was a devout Catholic and was declared a martyr after his death.
  - Lady Katherine Clinton (c. 1538 – 14 August 1621), married William Burgh, 2nd Baron Burgh of Gainsborough (c. 1522 – 10 October 1584), son of Thomas Burgh, 1st Baron Burgh. They had two children which included Thomas Burgh, 3rd Baron Burgh.
  - Lady Margaret Clinton (born c. 1539), married Charles Willoughby, 2nd Baron Willoughby of Parham (died 1603), and had five children.
- Secondly to Ursula Stourton, daughter of William Stourton, 7th Baron Stourton by whom he produced five children:
  - Henry Clinton, 2nd Earl of Lincoln, (1540 – 29 September 1616) eldest son and heir.
  - Lady Anne Clinton (1542–1629), married Sir William Ayscough (1541-22 Aug 1585).
  - Thomas Clinton (1548–1610); he married Mary Tyrell.
  - Lady Frances Clinton (1552 – 12 September 1623). She was born at Scrivelsby, Lincolnshire and died at Woburn Abbey, Bedfordshire. She married Giles Brydges, 3rd Baron Chandos.
  - Lady Elizabeth Clinton (1554–1634).
- Thirdly on 1 October 1552 to Elizabeth FitzGerald ("the fair Geraldine"), daughter of Gerald FitzGerald, 9th Earl of Kildare and the widow of Sir Anthony Browne. The marriage was childless.

== Death ==
He died in London on 16 January 1585.

== Notes ==
Political offices
| Preceded by The Earl of Warwick | Lord High Admiral; 1550–1554 | Succeeded by The Lord Howard of Effingham |
| Preceded by The Lord Howard of Effingham | Lord High Admiral of England; 1558–1585 | Succeeded by The Lord Howard of Effingham |
| Preceded by The Lord Howard of Effingham | Custos Rotulorum of Surrey; 1573–1585 | Succeeded by The Lord Howard of Effingham |
Peerage of England
| New creation | Earl of Lincoln; 1572–1585 | Succeeded by Henry Clinton |
| Preceded by Thomas Clinton | Baron Clinton; 1517–1585 | Succeeded by Henry Clinton |
