= Thomas Browne (died 1460) =

English politician (1402 - 1460)

Sir Thomas Browne
- Born: 1402
- Died: 20―29 July 1460
- Spouse: Eleanor FitzAlan
- Issue: William Browne; Sir George Browne; Thomas Browne; Sir Anthony Browne; Robert Browne; Leonard Browne; Edward Browne; Katherine Browne
- Father: Robert Browne

Sir Thomas Browne (1402 – 20 July 1460) was a Member of Parliament and Chancellor of the Exchequer. Browne's tenure as Chancellor occurred during the Great Bullion Famine and the Great Slump in England. He was executed for treason on 20 July 1460.

== Career ==
Thomas Browne was the son and heir of Robert Browne and a nephew of Stephen Browne MP. (Note: It is alluded that his father was Sir Robert Browne of Betchworth who was born in 1371 and died 1462 at an impressive age of 91 years; however, the source of this is not verifiable.) In 1434 he was sworn to the peace in Kent, and made a Justice of Peace there from 1436 to 24 December 1450. He was High Sheriff of Kent in 1443.

He was Member of Parliament for Dover in the 1439-40 Parliament, for Kent in 1445–6, and for Wallingford in 1449–50. He attended the Parliaments of 1447 and February 1449, though this appears to have been as Under-Treasurer rather than as an elected MP.

He served as Treasurer of the Household to Henry VI. He was knighted 1449/1451. During the reign of King Henry VI, his highest post was that of Under Treasurer to Marmaduke Lumley, Bishop of Carlisle at the Exchequer, which he held between February 1447 and July 1449. He was later Justice of Peace for Surrey from 20 July 1454 until his death.

Browne remained loyal to Henry VI and Lancastrian forces as England became increasingly politically unstable, especially from 1453 after Henry's mental breakdowns, as tensions mounted between Queen Margaret and Richard, Duke of York over control of the incapacitated King's government resulted with civil war in 1455. Browne was pardoned by the Yorkist's in 1455, and 1458. He was the Duke of Exeter's right-hand man in 1460, unwavering to the Lancastrian cause when Yorkist Earls (Warwick, Salisbury, and Edward) arrived in England. Browne assisted the effort by collecting men and broke the blockade during the siege of the Tower of London (1460).

Browne was convicted of treason on 20 July 1460. (Note: The transcript of the trial which convicted Browne is held at The National Archives, Kew.) According to some sources he was immediately executed by beheading, while according to other sources he and five others were executed at Tyburn by hanging on 29 July 1460.

== Property ==
- Betchworth Castle, which Browne purchased from his father in law, Thomas FitzAlan.
- Tonford Manor, Thanington, Kent, called 'Toniford', 'Tunford' etc., in the 27th year of Henry VI [1448] Browne obtained a grant of liberty to embattle and impark and to have free warren etc. within this manor. (Note: Hasted states Tonford came to the Brownes from Sir Thomas Fogge who acquired it from John de Toniford, however no source is provided. It was however Sir John Fogge on the demise of Browne who made a suit for Tonford in August 1460.)
- Morris-Court, Bapchild, Kent, situated within the ecclesiastical jurisdiction of the Diocese of Rochester and deanery of Sittingbourne. This property is said to have come into possession of the Browne family before 1413 during the reign of Henry IV.
- Eythorne Manor, Kent. Browne purchased the property from Sir Walter Hungerford, of Heytsbury during Henry VI reign, and in 1448 obtained the grant of a fair at the neighbouring village of Wimlingswold, to be held on the feast of St. Margaret the Virgin (20 July), but which is now held yearly on Old May-day.
- Hoptons Manor in the parish of Alkham, Kent.
- Kingsnorth Manor, Ulcombe, Kent. In the 27th year of the reign of Henry VI [1448], Browne obtained licence for a fair in this parish on the feast of St. Michael, and that same year had licence to embattle his mansion there and to enclose a park, and for freewarren in all his demesne lands within the manor.
- Westbury Manor, Wateringbury, Kent, which Browne purchased from Richard Fishborne in the 33rd year of Henry VI's reign [1454]. Now called Manor Farm.
- Swanscombe Manor, Greenhithe, Kent. Granted by the crown in 37th year of king Henry VI. [1458] to Browne after Richard, Duke of York who held this manor, was attainted.
- Tong Castle and Manor, Tong, Kent, which had also been in possession of Richard, Duke of York, but was taken by the crown in the 37th year of king Henry VI.[1458], and granted to Browne prior to his being knighted and appointed comptroller and treasurer of the King's household. Browne soon afterwards obtained a grant of a fair at this manor on St. James's day yearly, and another for liberty to embattle his mansion and to impark his lands here.
- The manor of Barfreston, Kent. The property was alienated to Browne from the heirs of John de Monynham (Moningham), which had deserted their patrimony here, in the latter end of king Henry VI.'s reign. The property was held by tenure as the castle guard at Dover.

== Family ==
In about 1437, Browne married Eleanor FitzAlan, daughter and heiress of Sir Thomas FitzAlan of Betchworth Castle in Surrey, the third son of John FitzAlan, 2nd Baron Arundel (d.1390) by his wife Elizabeth le Despenser (d.1408). By Eleanor FitzAlan he had seven sons and two daughters:

- William Browne (of Tavistock, Devon).
- Sir George Browne, beheaded in 1483. His estates were confiscated, but were afterwards restored to his heirs in 1485 by Henry VII.
- Thomas Browne.
- Sir Anthony Browne.
- Robert Browne, esquire, of Luddenham, Kent, Comptroller of the Household to Thomas FitzAlan, 17th Earl of Arundel, who married a wife named Anne, by whom he had a daughter, Eleanor Browne (died 1559), who married firstly, before 9 December 1509, Thomas Fogge (d. 16 August 1512), esquire, sergeant porter of Calais, younger son of Sir John Fogge, and secondly Sir William Kempe (d. 28 January 1539) of Olantigh, Kent. As a widow, Eleanor was a gentlewoman in the household of Mary I of England.
- Leonard Browne.
- Edward Browne.
- Catherine Browne, who married Humphrey Sackville, of Buckhurst Park, Sussex (1426 – 24 January 1488), son of Sir Edward Sackville and his wife Margaret Wakehurst.
- Jane Browne.
