= Robert Wingfield (diplomat) =

English diplomat

Sir Robert Wingfield
- Born: c.1464
- Died: 18 March 1539
- Spouses: Eleanor Raynsford; Jane Poynings
- Father: Sir John Wingfield
- Mother: Elizabeth Fitzlewis

Sir Robert Wingfield (c.1464 – 18 March 1539) was an English diplomat.

== Early life ==
Born about 1464, he was the seventh son of Sir John Wingfield (1428–1481) of Letheringham, Suffolk, a member of the Privy Council of Edward IV, and Sheriff of Norfolk and Suffolk, and Elizabeth Fitzlewis (d.1500), daughter of Sir John Fitzlewis of West Horndon, Essex, by Anne Montacute. Humphrey Wingfield and Richard Wingfield were his brothers. He was brought up by Anne, Lady Scrope, his stepmother. He first rose to favour under Henry VII when he fought with his brother Richard against the Cornish rebels in 1497.

== Diplomatic failure ==
He was employed by Henry VII on a mission to the Emperor Maximilian, returning in January 1508. On 2 July 1509 he is mentioned as a knight, the occasion being a grant to him by Henry VIII, part of the forfeitures of Edmund de la Pole, 3rd Duke of Suffolk. Further grants followed, and on 10 February 1511 he is styled 'councillor and knight of the body.’

In the same month Wingfield was despatched again on a mission to Maximilian, and in August following he and Silvester de Giglis, bishop of Worcester, were nominated ambassadors to a council convoked by Pope Julius II at the Lateran. The intention of the pope was to form a league against France, which Henry joined on 17 November The council was not actually opened till May 1512. Wingfield remained with the Emperor at Brussels and elsewhere, and does not appear to have attended its sittings. On 30 Sep Maximilian, hearing that Julius II was ill, appointed Wingfield and the bishop of Gurk his envoys to support the candidature of his nominee at Rome; but, exasperated at being left without money, Wingfield unceremoniously disappeared from the court of Brussels, ostensibly on a pilgrimage, but in reality to join his brother Sir Richard at Calais. Meanwhile he had been ordered to go back to the Emperor, then in Germany, and on 9 March 1513 he was at the imperial court at Worms. On 18 April 1513 he was again at Brussels, on that day despatched back to the Emperor at Augsburg to secure his support for Henry VIII's scheme of a general confederation against France.

As a reward for his services he had already (14 July) received a joint grant in survivorship with his brother Sir Richard of the office of Marshal of Calais. During the early autumn of 1513 he paid a brief visit to England, but in May 1514 he was at Vienna, asking for money and for his recall. The military success of the French in Italy in 1515 meant that Henry was even more eager to bring Maximilian in a confederacy against France. Maximilian on his part was ready to sell himself to the highest bidder. An acrimonious correspondence ensued between Wolsey and Wingfield. Wolsey was in a tricky situation as Wingfield was his cousin. Maximilian dangled before Henry becoming Duke of Milan, with the resignation of the Empire in his favour. Henry in reply refused to provide any more money, and expressed his displeasure with Wingfield for having advanced sixty thousand florins to the Emperor on his own responsibility.

In the summer of 1516 Henry wrote to Wingfield a letter of censure. A treaty was, however, drawn up between Henry and the emperor, dated 29 October 1516, providing for a monetary advance by Henry, in return for the offer of the imperial crown, to be formally made by Wingfield and the Cardinal of Sion. Wingfield received the emperor's oath but then heard rumours that Maximilian had secretly subscribed to the obnoxious Treaty of Noyon.

Wolsey, however, continued to employ Wingfield, and despatched him, together with Cuthbert Tunstall and the Earl of Worcester, to Brussels to negotiate with Charles (the future Emperor Charles V). The mission succeeded in obtaining from Charles on 11 May 1517 a ratification of Henry's treaty with the emperor of the previous October. Wingfield had left Brussels, at the time in the Netherlands, on 16 March to return to the imperial court. On 5 June, having received instructions from Henry to follow Maximilian back to Germany, Wingfield wrote to the king a point-blank refusal. He was unpaid, his servants refused to remain with him, and he was under vows to make pilgrimages in England.

== Return to diplomacy ==
On 18 August 1517 he was at Wenham Hall, Suffolk. During the next two and a half years Wingfield appears to have remained in retirement in England. In November 1520 he vacated his post of joint-deputy of Calais and apparently in December 1521 was appointed ambassador at Charles V's court. He was now not only a king's councillor but on the privy council, and vice-chamberlain. He arrived at Brussels on 8 February 1522. He apparently accompanied Charles to England in July. But on 14 Aug he again crossed the Channel as an ambassador, on this occasion to the court of Margaret of Savoy at Brussels. His instructions were to induce Margaret to lend active assistance to the projected operations of Charles and Henry against France. He returned to England in May 1523, but in August was appointed to a command in the Duke of Suffolk's army for the invasion of France. He seems to have taken no part in the campaign, remaining apparently in Calais, and he was appointed lieutenant of the castle by the influence of Wolsey.

After the battle of Pavia (23 February 1525) preparations were made by Henry for an invasion of France. Wingfield was nominated (11 April) to the council of war under the Duke of Norfolk, and was at the same time despatched, together with Sir William Fitzwilliam, to the court of Brussels to discuss concerted measures with the regent of the Netherlands. A series of evasive negotiations followed, and when Henry's projects of a joint invasion of France had given place to an alliance with the French (30 August), Wingfield had explained the change of policy by talking about on the necessity of international peace for the extirpation of Lutheranism.

== Lord Deputy of Calais, and later ==
In May 1526 he returned to Calais, and was appointed Lord Deputy on 1 October 1526. His reform led to much dissatisfaction, into which Wingfield was in 1533 one of the commissioners appointed to inquire. In the autumn and winter of 1530–31 he expanded the defences. His successor, Lord Berners, was appointed deputy of Calais on 27 March 1531.

Wingfield continued to reside in Calais, of which he became mayor in 1534. He had a valuable property in the outskirts of the town, four thousand acres in extent, which he had rented from the English Crown; it had been a marsh, which Wingfield drained, so impairing the defences of the town. After the adverse report of a commission on the matter, the houses Wingfield had built were destroyed and the sea let in. Wingfield's grievance against Lord Lisle, who had succeeded Berners as deputy, culminated in a quarrel in December 1535 as to the relative rights of the mayor and deputy. The king supported Lisle, and Wingfield was threatened with expulsion from the council. This was followed in July 1536 by the introduction of a bill into parliament for the revocation of Wingfield's grant. The bill passed the commons, but with difficulty, and was withdrawn, but Wingfield was persuaded to surrender his patent to the king on 25 July. In return Wingfield received a grant of lands in the neighbourhood of Guisnes. Wingfield, however, now brought an action at Guisnes against minor officials concerned in the destruction of his property. Lisle stayed the proceedings, and Wingfield retaliated by procuring the election of Lisle's enemy, Lord Edmund Howard, as mayor of Calais. Howard was, however, displaced, and Wingfield in January 1538 renewed his action before the courts at Westminster.

== Marriages ==
Wingfield married firstly Eleanor Raynsford (d. before 4 July 1519), daughter of Sir William Raynsford of Bradfield, Essex, Marshal of Calais, by whom he had no issue.

He married secondly Jane (or Joan) Poynings, one of the seven illegitimate children of Sir Edward Poynings (1459–1521) of Westenhanger, Kent, by whom he had no issue. She was the sister of Thomas Poynings, 1st Baron Poynings (d.1545), Edward Poynings (d.1546), and Sir Adrian Poynings. By her first marriage to Thomas Clinton, 8th Baron Clinton (d.1517), she was the mother of Edward Clinton, 1st Earl of Lincoln (d.1585), Lord Admiral of England.

== Death ==
Wingfield died on 18 March 1539. His widow survived him. He was patron of the college of Rushworth or Rushford, Norfolk. In 1520 he was specially admitted at Lincoln's Inn. During the greater part of his life he was an opponent of Lutheranism, but on 25 February 1539, shortly before his death, he wrote Henry a letter praising his ecclesiastical policy and lamenting his own former ignorance.

== Works ==
In 1517 Dirk Martens, Erasmus’s printer, published Wingfield's book entitled Disceptatio super dignitate et magnitudine Regnorum Britannici et Gallici habita ab utriusque Oratoribus et Legatis in Concilio Constantiensi which countered anti-English views in Europe.
