= Listed buildings in Brabourne =

Civil Parish in Kent, England

Brabourne is a village and civil parish in the Borough of Ashford of Kent, England. It contains one grade I, one grade II* and 43 grade II listed buildings that are recorded in the National Heritage List for England.

This list is based on the information retrieved online from Historic England.

== Key ==
| Grade | Criteria |
|---|---|
| I | Buildings that are of exceptional interest |
| II* | Particularly important buildings of more than special interest |
| II | Buildings that are of special interest |

== Listing ==
| Name | Grade | Location | Type | Completed (Note: The date given is the date used by Historic England as significant for the initial building or that of an important part in the structure's description.) | Date designated | Grid ref. (Note: The grid reference is based on the British national grid reference system, sometimes known as OSGB36, used by the Ordnance Survey.) Geo-coordinates | Notes | Entry number (Note: The "List Entry Number" is a unique number assigned to each listed building and scheduled monument by Historic England.) | Image | Wikidata |
|---|---|---|---|---|---|---|---|---|---|---|
| Bircholt Court | II | Bircholt | | | 16 February 1989 | TR0755741171; 51°07′56″N 0°57′55″E | | 1232627 | Upload Photo | Q26526147 |
| Barn and Oasthouse at Tr092424 | II | Brabourne Coomb | | | 16 February 1989 | TR0924342390; 51°08′33″N 0°59′24″E | | 1232631 | Upload Photo | Q26526151 |
| Barn and Shed at Tr 091424 | II | Brabourne Coomb | | | 16 February 1989 | TR0920342360; 51°08′32″N 0°59′22″E | | 1232630 | Upload Photo | Q26526150 |
| Barn About 10 Metres North East of Bulltown Farmhouse | II | Bulltown Lane | | | 16 February 1989 | TR0874043308; 51°09′03″N 0°59′00″E | | 1277008 | Upload Photo | Q26566476 |
| Bulltown Farmhouse | II | Bulltown Lane | | | 13 October 1952 | TR0872143297; 51°09′03″N 0°58′59″E | | 1232633 | Upload Photo | Q26526153 |
| Hope Farmhouse | II | Bulltown Lane | | | 16 February 1989 | TR0857743064; 51°08′56″N 0°58′51″E | | 1232632 | Upload Photo | Q26526152 |
| Little Foord | II | Bulltown Lane | | | 16 February 1989 | TR0799942717; 51°08′45″N 0°58′21″E | | 1232637 | Upload Photo | Q26526156 |
| Barn About 10 Metres South of Penstock Hall | II | Canterbury Road, East Brabourne | | | 16 February 1989 | TR0985641852; 51°08′15″N 0°59′54″E | | 1276973 | Upload Photo | Q26566443 |
| Barn About 20 Metres South West of Penstock Hall | II | Canterbury Road, East Brabourne | | | 16 February 1989 | TR0983141867; 51°08′15″N 0°59′53″E | | 1232725 | Upload Photo | Q26526237 |
| Egerton Cottages | II | 1 and 2, Canterbury Road, East Brabourne | | | 16 February 1989 | TR1003141998; 51°08′19″N 1°00′04″E | | 1232642 | Upload Photo | Q26526161 |
| Idenborough | II | Canterbury Road, East Brabourne | | | 16 February 1989 | TR0941841852; 51°08′15″N 0°59′32″E | | 1232639 | Upload Photo | Q26526158 |
| Ivy Cottage | II | Canterbury Road, East Brabourne | | | 16 February 1989 | TR0996841906; 51°08′16″N 1°00′00″E | | 1277009 | Upload Photo | Q26566477 |
| Malthouse and Oast with Wall and Gate About 15 Metres West and South West of Ivy Cottage | II | Canterbury Road, East Brabourne | | | 16 February 1989 | TR0993441902; 51°08′16″N 0°59′58″E | | 1232712 | Upload Photo | Q26526224 |
| Penstock Hall | II | Canterbury Road, East Brabourne | | | 27 November 1957 | TR0986141875; 51°08′16″N 0°59′55″E | | 1276933 | Upload Photo | Q26566406 |
| Barn About 20 Metres South of Court Farmhouse | II | Lees Road | | | 9 March 1988 | TR0774640323; 51°07′28″N 0°58′03″E | | 1232759 | Upload Photo | Q26526270 |
| Bircholt Corner | II | Lees Road | | | 16 February 1989 | TR0812741047; 51°07′51″N 0°58′24″E | | 1276928 | Upload Photo | Q26566401 |
| Court Farmhouse | II | Lees Road | | | 3 December 1987 | TR0773940351; 51°07′29″N 0°58′02″E | | 1232754 | Upload Photo | Q26526265 |
| Morley Cottage | II | Lees Road | | | 16 February 1989 | TR0771640321; 51°07′28″N 0°58′01″E | | 1232644 | Upload Photo | Q26526163 |
| Pemsey Farmhouse | II | Lees Road | | | 27 November 1957 | TR0786140613; 51°07′37″N 0°58′09″E | | 1232787 | Upload Photo | Q26526297 |
| Ridgeway House | II | Lees Road | | | 16 February 1989 | TR0770540247; 51°07′26″N 0°58′00″E | | 1232743 | Upload Photo | Q26526254 |
| Sheepshead House | II | Lees Road, TN25 6QE | | | 16 February 1989 | TR0801440531; 51°07′35″N 0°58′17″E | | 1232646 | Upload Photo | Q26526165 |
| 1-3, the Street | II | 1-3, The Street | | | 16 February 1989 | TR1005041914; 51°08′17″N 1°00′04″E | | 1232795 | Upload Photo | Q26526305 |
| Applegarth (the Former Post Office) | II | The Street | | | 16 February 1989 | TR1003341931; 51°08′17″N 1°00′03″E | | 1232796 | Upload Photo | Q26526306 |
| Barn About 50 Metres South West of Court Lodge (tr 102 418) | II | The Street | | | 16 February 1989 | TR1020741771; 51°08′12″N 1°00′12″E | | 1276894 | Upload Photo | Q26566369 |
| Church Farmhouse | II | The Street | | | 16 February 1989 | TR1035041726; 51°08′10″N 1°00′19″E | | 1232884 | Upload Photo | Q26526386 |
| Church of St Mary | I | The Street | | | 27 November 1957 | TR1036041678; 51°08′09″N 1°00′20″E | | 1232793 | Church of St Mary More images | Q17529376 |
| Coachhouse and Stables About 10 Metres North of Coquet Lodge | II | The Street | | | 16 February 1989 | TR1039041731; 51°08′10″N 1°00′21″E | | 1232791 | Upload Photo | Q26526302 |
| Coquet Lodge | II | The Street | | | 27 November 1957 | TR1037441722; 51°08′10″N 1°00′21″E | | 1276930 | Upload Photo | Q26566403 |
| Court Lodge and Courtyard to Rear | II | The Street | | | 16 February 1989 | TR1030541785; 51°08′12″N 1°00′17″E | | 1232788 | Upload Photo | Q26526298 |
| Courtyard and Building Immediately to East of and Adjoining Court Lodge | II | The Street | | | 16 February 1989 | TR1032141773; 51°08′12″N 1°00′18″E | | 1276929 | Upload Photo | Q26566402 |
| Gates and Railings to Brabourne Churchyard Between Coquet Lodge and Church Farmhouse | II | The Street | | | 16 February 1989 | TR1036341723; 51°08′10″N 1°00′20″E | | 1276931 | Upload Photo | Q26566404 |
| Group of 4 Headstones 10 to 15 Metres North West of Church of St Mary | II | The Street | | | 16 February 1989 | TR1034841699; 51°08′09″N 1°00′19″E | | 1276893 | Upload Photo | Q26566368 |
| Headstone to Ann Caistor, About 25 Metres North of Church of St Mary | II | About 25 Metres North Of Church Of St Mary, The Street | | | 16 February 1989 | TR1036941701; 51°08′09″N 1°00′20″E | | 1232794 | Upload Photo | Q26526304 |
| Hill View | II | 1 and 2, The Street | | | 16 February 1989 | TR1017641822; 51°08′13″N 1°00′11″E | | 1232894 | Upload Photo | Q26526395 |
| K6 Telephone Kiosk | II | The Street | | | 17 April 2009 | TR1001741963; 51°08′18″N 1°00′03″E | | 1393231 | Upload Photo | Q26672410 |
| Parsonage Farmhouse | II | The Street | | | 27 November 1957 | TR1043441700; 51°08′09″N 1°00′24″E | | 1232789 | Upload Photo | Q26526299 |
| St Cyriac | II | The Street | | | 16 February 1989 | TR1040341740; 51°08′11″N 1°00′22″E | | 1232790 | Upload Photo | Q26526300 |
| The Five Bells | II | The Street | | | 16 February 1989 | TR1002441938; 51°08′17″N 1°00′03″E | | 1232899 | Upload Photo | Q26526399 |
| Boulding House | II | Weekes Lane | | | 16 February 1989 | TR0815942129; 51°08′26″N 0°58′28″E | | 1232922 | Upload Photo | Q26526422 |
| The Hall | II* | Weekes Lane | | | 13 October 1952 | TR0884042546; 51°08′39″N 0°59′03″E | | 1232797 | Upload Photo | Q17556499 |
| Broadoak Cottage | II | West Brabourne | | | 27 November 1957 | TR0705442258; 51°08′32″N 0°57′31″E | | 1276841 | Upload Photo | Q26566324 |
| Burches Farmhouse | II | West Brabourne | | | 16 February 1989 | TR0689142041; 51°08′25″N 0°57′22″E | | 1232926 | Upload Photo | Q26526425 |
| California Farm | II | West Brabourne | | | 16 February 1989 | TR0655841466; 51°08′07″N 0°57′04″E | | 1232925 | Upload Photo | Q26526424 |
| Fallon Farmhouse | II | West Brabourne | | | 16 February 1989 | TR0729041962; 51°08′22″N 0°57′43″E | | 1232943 | Upload Photo | Q26526441 |
| Fordswater | II | West Brabourne | | | 16 February 1989 | TR0791141897; 51°08′19″N 0°58′14″E | | 1232941 | Upload Photo | Q26526439 |

== See also ==
- Grade I listed buildings in Kent
- Grade II* listed buildings in Kent

== Sources ==
- Newman, John (2012) [1969], Kent: West and the Weald, The Buildings of England, New Haven and London: Yale University Press, ISBN 978-0-300-18509-6
