= Poynings Heron =

Poynings Heron (1548 - 1595) was an English soldier and commander during the Spanish Armada.

== Biography ==
He was born the eldest son of Sir Nicholas Heron in Addiscombe, Surrey. He matriculated as a fellow-commoner of Queens' College, Cambridge in 1565. Following the death of his father in 1568, he succeeded to his estates. He later joined the military, and served with distinction in wars in Ireland and the Netherlands. In 1588, holding the rank of captain and in anticipation of the Spanish Armada, he commanded 300 trained and 75 untrained men of Surrey. He died in January 1595.

He married Elizabeth, daughter of Gregory Lovell the cofferer to Elizabeth I, and had nine children.
