= Edward Poynings =

Member of the Parliament of England

Sir Edward Poynings
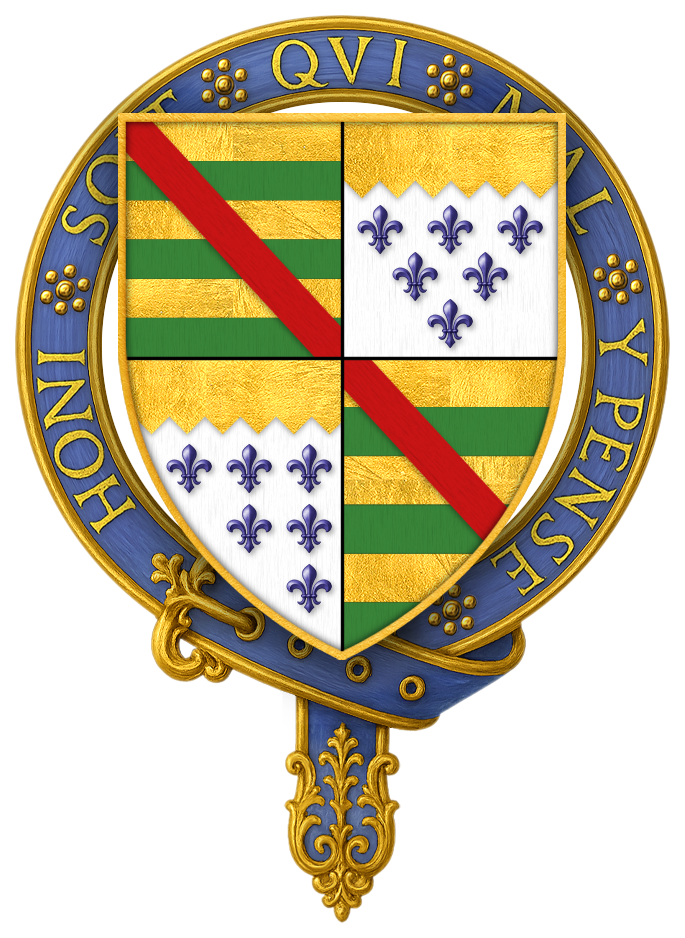
- Arms of Sir Edward Poynings, KG
- Born: 1459
- Died: 22 October 1521 (aged 61–62)
- Spouse: Elizabeth Scott
- Issue: John Poynings; Thomas Poynings, 1st Baron Poynings (illegitimate); Edward Poynings (illegitimate); Sir Adrian Poynings (illegitimate); Jane Poynings (illegitimate); Margaret Poynings (illegitimate); Mary Poynings (illegitimate); Rose Poynings (illegitimate)
- Father: Sir Robert Poynings
- Mother: Elizabeth Paston

Sir Edward Poynings KG (1459 – 22 October 1521) was an English soldier, administrator and diplomat, and Lord Deputy of Ireland under King Henry VII of England.

== Early life ==
Edward Poynings was the only son of Sir Robert Poynings (c.1419–1461) and Elizabeth Paston (1429?–1487/8), the only daughter of William Paston (1378–1444). He was likely born at his father's house in Southwark, afterwards the Crosskeys tavern, and then the Queen's Head. His father had been carver and sword-bearer to Jack Cade, and was killed at the Second Battle of St Albans on 17 February 1461. His mother, who married Robert Poynings in December 1459, inherited her husband's property in Kent in spite of opposition from her brother-in-law, Edward Poynings, master of Arundel College. Before 1472 she married a second husband, Sir George Browne of Betchworth Castle, Surrey, by whom she had a son, Matthew, and a daughter. She died in 1487, appointing Edward as her executor. Some of her correspondence is included in the Paston Letters.

Poynings was brought up by his mother. In October 1483 he was a leader of the rising in Kent planned to second Buckingham's insurrection against Richard III. He was named in the king's proclamation, but escaped abroad to follow Henry, Earl of Richmond. He was in Brittany in October 1484, and in August 1485 landed with Richmond at Milford Haven. He was at once made a knight banneret, and in the same year was sworn of the Privy Council.

== Under Henry VII ==
In 1488 Poynings was on a commission to inspect the ordnance at Calais, and in 1491 was made a Knight of the Garter. In the following year he was placed in command of fifteen hundred men sent to aid the Emperor Maximilian against his rebellious subjects in the Netherlands. The rebels, under the leadership of Ravenstein, held Bruges, Damme, and Sluys, where they fitted out ships to prey on English commerce. Poynings first cleared the sea of the privateers, and then laid siege to Sluys in August, while the Duke of Saxony blockaded it on land. After some hard fighting the two castles defending the town were taken, and the rebels entered into negotiations with Poynings to return to their allegiance. Poynings then joined Henry VII before Boulogne, but the French war was closed almost without bloodshed by the treaty of Etaples on 3 November.

In 1493 Poynings was acting as deputy or governor of Calais. In July he was sent with Warham on a mission to Archduke Philip to gain Perkin Warbeck's expulsion from Burgundy, where he had been welcomed by the dowager duchess Margaret. The envoys obtained from Philip a promise that he would abstain from aiding Warbeck, but the duke asserted that he could not control the actions of the duchess, who was the real ruler of the country.

== In Ireland ==
Meanwhile, in Ireland, a Yorkist stronghold, the struggles between the Butlers and Geraldines had reduced royal authority to a shadow even within the English Pale, and Gerald Fitzgerald, 8th Earl of Kildare, the head of the Geraldines and Lord Deputy, was in treasonable relations with Warbeck. Henry appointed Prince Henry as viceroy, and made Poynings the prince's deputy.

Poynings landed at Howth on 13 October 1494 with a thousand men, and Henry Deane, bishop of Bangor, to act as chancellor, Hugh Conway as treasurer, and others to control the courts of king's bench, common pleas, and exchequer. Poynings' first measure was an expedition into Ulster, in conjunction with Kildare, to punish O'Donnell, O'Hanlon, Magennis, and other chieftains who had abetted Warbeck's first invasion of Ireland. His progress was stopped by the news that Kildare was plotting with O'Hanlon against his life; some colour was given to the charge by the revolt of Kildare's brother James, who seized Carlow Castle, mounted the Geraldine banner, and refused to surrender when summoned in the king's name. Poynings abandoned the Ulster invasion, turned south, and with some difficulty reduced Carlow; he then proceeded to Drogheda and summoned a parliament.

=== Poynings' Parliament ===
The parliament opened on 1 December 1494, and, after attainting Kildare, proceeded to pass for Poynings numerous acts tending to make Irish administration directly dependent on the Crown and privy council. Judges and others were to hold office during pleasure, and not by patent as hitherto; the chief castles were to be put in English hands; it was made illegal to carry weapons or make private war without license, and it was declared high treason to excite the Irish to take up arms. Further the statutes of Kilkenny passed in 1366, forbidding marriage or intercourse between the English colonists and the Irish, and the adoption by Englishmen of Irish laws, customs, or manners, were also re-enacted.

Over the centuries, the terms "The Statute[s] of Drogheda", "Poynings' Law", or "Poynings' Act" have been applied variously by politicians, historians, and lawyers, either to the full set (or "statute", 10 Hen. 7) of acts passed by the parliament, or to one of two specific acts (or "chapters"):

- "An Act that no Parliament be holden in this Land until the Acts be certified into England" (10 Hen. 7. c. 4 (I)): (Note: The chapter numbers c. 4 and c. 22 for the acts are from The Irish Statutes; the numbers in Analecta Hibernica are c. 7 and c. 39.) Constitutionally, no parliament should be summoned in Ireland except under the Great Seal of England, or without notice to the English privy council, and that no acts of the Irish parliament should be valid unless previously submitted. This rendered the Irish parliament completely subordinate to that of England. Despite some amendments and promises of repeal, it was not until the Constitution of 1782 that the Irish parliament once more became independent.
- "An Act confirming all the Statutes made in England" (10 Hen. 7. c. 22 (I)): while the act referred to acts "lately made", it was subsequently interpreted as applying to all acts of the Parliament of England made before 1494.

=== Later actions ===
While this parliament was sitting, Poynings made another expedition into Ulster, leaving a commission with his chancellor to continue, prorogue, or dissolve it as he thought fit. The Irish retreated, and the second expedition was even less successful than the first. Poynings now negotiated alliances with various septs, chiefly by money payments, and enforced on the inhabitants of the Pale the duty of protecting its borders against Irish incursions. With the help of his under-treasurer, William Hatteclyffe, with whom he was connected by marriage, Poynings endeavoured to reform the finances; but the opposition of subordinate officials largely impaired his success, and Warbeck's attack on Waterford in July 1495 interrupted the work. The lord deputy marched in person against Perkin, who blockaded Waterford with eleven ships, while Desmond, with 2,400 men, attacked it on land. The town held out for eleven days, and then, on Poynings's approach, Warbeck fled to Scotland.

Poynings was recalled in January 1496. The Yorkists in Ireland had been dealt with, but Henry was disappointed that Poynings, through his system of subsidising Irish chiefs, and the partial failure of his fiscal reforms, had been unable to make Ireland pay her own way; and he now fell back on the cheaper method of governing by the help of the great Anglo-Irish families. Kildare, who had regained favour, was once more appointed deputy, and the Geraldine supremacy lasted till 1534.

== Later life ==
After his return to England, Poynings was occupied in the administration of the Cinque ports, of which he was appointed warden in succession to his brother-in-law, Sir William Scot, and Prince Henry. In 1500 he was present at the interview between Henry VII and the Archduke Philip at Calais, and in October 1501 was one of those appointed to meet and conduct Catherine of Aragon to London. He performed a similar office for the Flemish ambassadors who came to England in 1508 to conclude the projected marriage of Henry's daughter Mary to Prince Charles of Castile, and some time before the king's death became controller of the household. He was one of those trusty councillors who were recommended by Henry VII in his will to his son.

Poynings's offices of controller and warden of the Cinque ports were regranted him at the beginning of the new reign. In 1511 he was again on active service. In June he was placed in command of some ships and a force of fifteen hundred men, and despatched to assist Margaret of Savoy, Regent of the Netherlands, in suppressing the revolt in Gelderland. He embarked at Sandwich on 18 July, reduced several towns and castles, and then proceeded to besiege Venlo. After three unsuccessful assaults the siege was raised, and Poynings, loaded with favours by Margaret and Charles, returned to England in the autumn.

Sir Edward Poynings Act 1513
- Act of Parliament
- Parliament of England
- Long title: An Acte concernyng Sir Edwarde Poynynges.
- Citation: 5 Hen. 8. c. 18 (Note: This is the citation in The Statutes of the Realm.); 5 Hen. 8. c. 10 Pr. (Note: This is the citation in The Statutes at Large.)
- Territorial extent: England and Wales

Dates
- Royal assent: 4 March 1514
- Commencement: 23 January 1514 (Note: Start of session.)
- Repealed: 31 July 1978
Other legislation
Repealed by	Statute Law (Repeals) Act 1978

Status: Repealed

Text of statute as originally enacted

Poynings sat in the parliament summoned on 4 February 1512, probably for some constituency in Kent, but the returns are lost. From May to November he was going from place to place in the Netherlands, negotiating a league against France. He was similarly employed early in 1513, with the formation of the 'holy league' on 5 April between the emperor, the pope, and the kings of England and Spain. With a retinue of five hundred men he was present at the capture of Therouanne on 22 August, and of Tournai on 24 September. He was in bad health, and though made lieutenant of Tournai, on 20 January 1514 William Blount, 4th Baron Mountjoy succeeded him. But through most of 1514 Poynings was in the Netherlands, engaged in diplomatic work.

In October peace was made with France, and in February 1515 Poynings returned to England, with a pension of a thousand marks from Charles, and requested leave to go on a pilgrimage to Rome. In March he was appointed ambassador to the Pope, but the embassy never started; and on 7 May, with William Knight (1476–1547), he was nominated envoy to renew the league of 1505 with Prince Charles. On 14 September Poynings returned to England, after four months' unsuccessful negotiation. In the same month, however, the victory of France at Marignano once more cemented the league of her enemies, and Poynings, who was recommissioned ambassador to Charles (now king of Spain) on 21 February 1516, succeeded in concluding a treaty with him on 19 April.

This was the last of Poynings's major negotiations, and he spent now most of his time at his manor of Westenhanger, Kent, where he rebuilt the castle, or the Cinque Ports. In June 1517 he was deciding disputes between English and French merchants at Calais, and in the same year he became chancellor of the order of the Garter. He is occasionally referred to as Lord Poynings, but never became a peer. In 1518 he was treating for the surrender of Tournai, and in 1520 he took part in the proceedings at the Field of the Cloth of Gold. He was also present at Henry's meeting with Emperor Charles V at Gravelines on 10 July. He died at Westenhanger in October 1521.

Poynings' will is printed in Nicholas Harris Nicolas's Testamenta Vetusta. His estates passed to Henry Algernon Percy, 5th Earl of Northumberland, the grandson of Poynings's first cousin Eleanor, who married Henry Percy, 3rd Earl of Northumberland.

== Marriage and issue ==
Poynings married, before 1485, Isabel or Elizabeth Scott (d. 15 August 1528), daughter of Sir John Scott (d.1485), Marshal of Calais, and sister of Sir William Scott, Lord Warden of the Cinque Ports and Sheriff of Kent, by whom he had a son, John Poynings, who predeceased him without issue. Elizabeth Scott was buried in Brabourne church, where she is commemorated by a brass.

Poynings also had seven illegitimate children:

- Thomas Poynings, 1st Baron Poynings.
- Edward Poynings, captain of the guard at Boulogne, killed in action there in 1546.
- Sir Adrian Poynings, appointed lieutenant to Wyatt at Boulogne in February 1546, captain of Boulogne in the following June, and served for some years under the Lord High Admiral. He was knighted at the accession of Elizabeth, and in 1561 became governor of Portsmouth, where he died on 15 February 1571. His daughter, Anne, married Sir George More of Loseley, Surrey.
- Jane Poynings, who married firstly Thomas Clinton, 8th Baron Clinton (d.1517), by whom she was the mother of Edward Clinton, 1st Earl of Lincoln (d.1585), Lord Admiral of England, and secondly, as his second wife, Sir Robert Wingfield (d.1539), by whom she had no issue.
- Margaret Poynings, who married Edward Barry of Sevington.
- Mary Poynings, who married Thomas Wilsford.
- Rose Poynings (born 1505), who married a husband surnamed Lewknor.

== Citations ==
Political offices
Preceded by The Prince of Wales	Lord Warden of the Cinque Ports; 1509–1534	Succeeded by The Lord Bergavenny
Preceded by Sir Thomas Lovell	Treasurer of the Household; 1519–1521	Succeeded by Sir Thomas Boleyn
