= Brabourne =

Village in Kent, England

Coordinates: 51°8′18″N 1°0′3″E

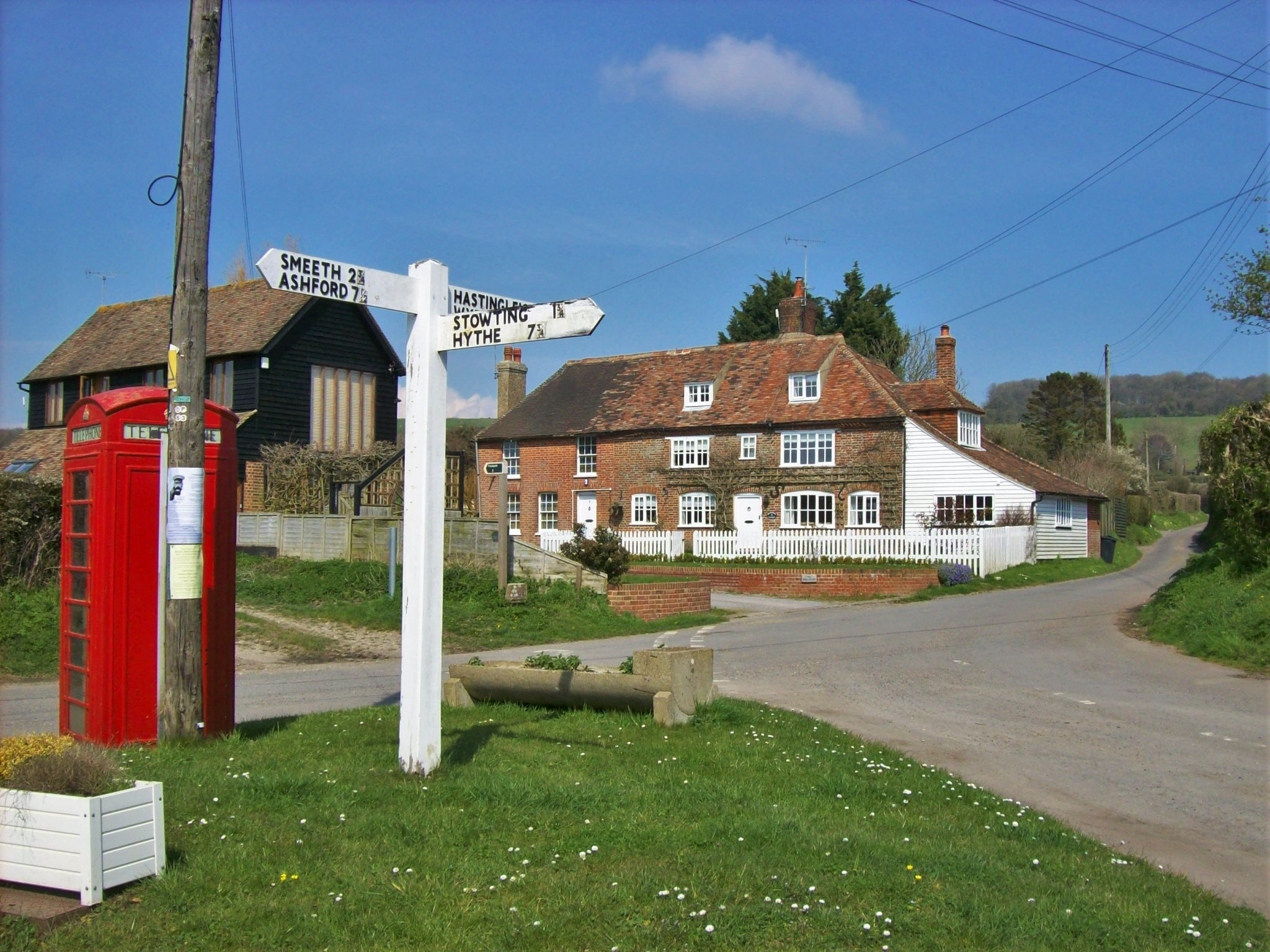

- Location within Kent
- Area: 14.77 km^{2} (5.70 sq mi)
- Population: 1,309 (Civil Parish 2011)
  - Density: 89/km^{2} (230/sq mi)
- OS grid reference: TR085405
- District: Ashford
- Shire county: Kent
- Region: South East
- Country: England
- Sovereign state: United Kingdom
- Post town: ASHFORD
- Postcode district: TN25
- Dialling code: 01303
- Police: Kent
- Fire: Kent
- Ambulance: South East Coast
- UK Parliament: Ashford

Brabourne is a village and civil parish in the Ashford district of Kent, England. The village centre is 4.5 miles (7.2 km) east of Ashford town centre.

== Geography ==
The village originated around the village church and this area is now usually referred to as East Brabourne. The original village has been outgrown by Brabourne Lees, a development on former common land, closer to the A20 and M20 roads. The western part of the parish is a rural area with scattered farms.

== Church ==
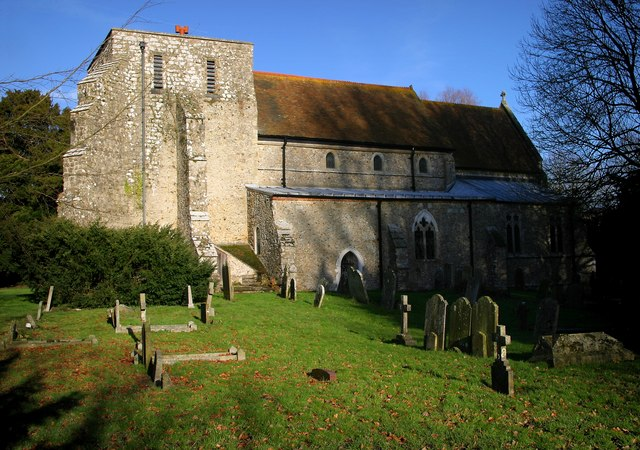
St Mary the Virgin's Church

The parish church is dedicated to St Mary the Blessed Virgin; there is also a Zion Strict Baptist Chapel in Brabourne Lees. The church of St. Mary is a building of stone, in the Norman and Early English styles, and has a tower which was restored in 1923-24, containing six bells, increased to eight in 2002. There are numerous monuments to the Scott family, some brasses and several stained glass windows, one of which contains very early glass; the church affords seating for 200. The restoration was carried out by Sir Gilbert Scott.

== In popular culture ==
Author Russell Hoban repurposes Brabourne as "Brabbas Horn" in his 1980, post apocalyptic novel Riddley Walker.

== See also ==
- Listed buildings in Brabourne
