= List of captains, lieutenants and lords deputies of English Calais =

The town of Calais, now part of France, was in English hands from 1347 to 1558, and this page lists the commanders of Calais, holding office from the English Crown, called at different times Captain of Calais, King's Lieutenant of Calais (Castle), or Lord Deputy of Calais.

== Terminology and background ==
Commands were over the castle of Calais, the town, the march and its outlying castles; command was often divided, and deputies frequently appointed for commanders who might be absent. The terminology was flexible, changed over time, and may not be accurately given in some sources. The military, political and even financial situation, and the presence or absence of officers, did affect how the system operated. The terms used changed over nearly two centuries. The system of royal officials set up after Edward III took Calais consisted of captain, marshal, seneschal and constable. But changes were soon seen.

Calais refers properly here to the Pale of Calais, or March of Calais, part of the Kingdom of England, namely the English bridgehead area between the County of Artois and County of Flanders; it varied in area according to the military position. The boundary took in wetlands and was not always clear, but the area amounted to about 20 square miles.

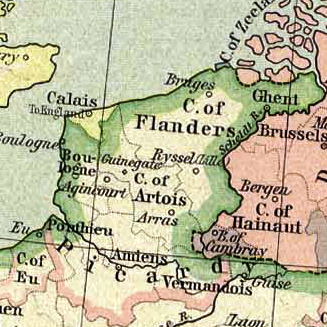
Map showing the March of Calais in 1477.

The approaches to Calais, which is a port on the coast, were defended by two inland castles, that of Guînes, somewhat to the south-east, and Hammes (Hampnes, Hammez) in the present commune of Hames-Boucres, somewhat to the southwest. Calais had also castellans (of Calais Castle); "Captain of Calais Castle" is a different post from "Captain of Calais", the title of the top commander and military governor of the Pale for most of the period.

== Deputies ==
When "deputy" is used, it may or may not mean a second-in-command: there is no consistency across the period. From Latin records there come "vice" (in the place of) or "locum tenens" (holding the place of). "Lieutenant" is a direct French translation of "locum tenens"; it means generally the second-in-command to the "captain" or head commander. There is a mention of a "deputy lieutenant", however. Caveats are required because a "lord deputy" has to be understood as deputy to the king; and the term "deputy governor" should usually be read "lord deputy and governor", not "deputy to the governor".

The Lord Deputy of Calais, a Tudor title only, was the English king's representative and head of the Council of Calais. The title of Lord Deputy was used in Calais only from 1507. The Council existed in some form under Edward IV, and lasted until the French conquest of Calais in 1558. There could be more than one Deputy holding the title at a given time.

In practical terms the Lord Deputy was also the military governor of Calais, but the two posts were not formally the same: in 1552 Lord William Howard became "lord deputy and governor of Calais". "Governor of Calais" may also refer to the French post after 1558.

== Captains and lieutenants of Calais ==
Dates	Holder	Position, subordinates
1348–1350	John de Beauchamp, 1st Baron Beauchamp de Warwick	Captain
1352	Thomas Holland, 1st Earl of Kent	Captain
1353	Reynold Cobham, 1st Baron Cobham of Sterborough	Captain.
1361	Henry Scrope, 1st Baron Scrope of Masham	Warden of Calais and Guînes.
1373	Sir John Burley	Captain.
1375–1378	Hugh Calveley	Captain. Bernard Brocas was Captain of Calais Castle 1377–1379.
1379	William Montagu, 2nd Earl of Salisbury	Captain.
February 1380	Bryan Stapleton	Captain of Calais Castle very briefly, becoming Captain of Guînes, under the Black Prince as governor.
1380	John Devereux, Baron Devereux	Captain.
1383	William Beauchamp, 1st Baron Bergavenny	Captain.
1384-1388	Edmund de la Pole (Captain of Calais)	Captain.
1389	Henry Percy, 1st Earl of Northumberland	Captain.
1391–1398	Thomas Mowbray, 1st Duke of Norfolk	Captain.
1398–1399	John Holland, 1st Earl of Huntingdon and Duke of Exeter	Captain. William le Scrope, 1st Earl of Wiltshire was Captain of Calais Castle in 1398.
1401–1410	John Beaufort, 1st Earl of Somerset	Captain.
1410–1413	Prince Henry	Captain.
	William Zouche, 4th Baron Zouche	Lieutenant.
1414	Richard de Beauchamp, 13th Earl of Warwick	Captain.
1427	Richard Woodville	Lieutenant.
1427	John of Lancaster, 1st Duke of Bedford	Captain.
1435	Richard Woodville	Lieutenant.
1435	Humphrey of Lancaster, 1st Duke of Gloucester	Captain.
1437	Thomas Rempston	Lieutenant. John Sutton, 1st Baron Dudley was lieutenant of Calais Castle from 1437 to 1442.
1439–1442	Thomas Kyriell	Lieutenant.
1441–1451	Humphrey Stafford, 1st Duke of Buckingham	Captain. Ralph Boteler, 1st Baron Sudeley was Captain of Calais Castle 1450–1452, and was sent to Calais in 1451. Sir John Stoughton was Lieutenant 1450–1.
1451	Edmund Beaufort, 2nd Duke of Somerset	Captain. Lionel de Welles, 6th Baron Welles, connected to Somerset by marriage, was his deputy-captain (or lieutenant) after 1451; it is presumed he remained in post until Warwick arrived in April 1456.
1454–1455	Richard Plantagenet, 3rd Duke of York	Captain.
1455–1458	Richard Neville, 16th Earl of Warwick	Captain.
1459	Henry Beaufort, 3rd Duke of Somerset	Captain.
1461–1471	Richard Neville, 16th Earl of Warwick	Captain. His deputy was John Wenlock, 1st Baron Wenlock. Sir Walter Wrottesley took over while Warwick put Henry VI back on the throne. At the end of the period John Howard also acted as deputy lieutenant.
1471	Anthony Woodville, 2nd Earl Rivers	Lieutenant, appointed as successor to Warwick. But Hastings was brought in over his head.
1471–1483	William Hastings, 1st Baron Hastings	Captain, mostly absent. John Howard acted as deputy, John Dynham at the end of the period; Ralph Hastings, his brother, was his man on the ground.
1483	John Dynham, 1st Baron Dynham	Lieutenant.
	John Blount, 3rd Baron Mountjoy	Temporary governor of Calais, then Guînes. He had been lieutenant of Hammes since 1470, but under Richard III was an ill man, and left Hammes to his brother James Blount who had held the position jointly with him from 1476; and had Thomas Montgomery as deputy. They all proved disloyal to Richard.
1485	John of Gloucester	Captain. James Tyrrell was appointed lieutenant of Guînes as Richard appointed loyalists.
1486	Giles Daubeney	Lieutenant-governor.
1492	Richard Nanfan	Deputy lieutenant.
1493	Edward Poynings	Deputy lieutenant; but "deputy or governor" in the old DNB. Governor.
1500–1506	Sir Anthony Browne (died 1506)	Lieutenant

== Lords deputies of Calais ==
Dates	Holder	Position
1509	Sir Gilbert Talbot	Lord Deputy. He continued in a joint appointment with Richard Wingfield.
1513–1519	Richard Wingfield	Initially marshal in 1511, Lord Deputy from 1513. Robert Wingfield shared his duties from that time. At some point John Peche was a joint Deputy with the Wingfields. From 1513 to 1520 Nicholas Carew with his father Richard held the post of lieutenant of Calais Castle; Richard is described as a previous Captain of Calais. In 1519 Edward Guildford was appointed marshal of Calais.
1520–1526	John Bourchier, 2nd Baron Berners	Lord Deputy. John Wallop was made high marshal in 1524. From 1520 until his death in 1523 the Lieutenant of Calais Castle was Maurice Berkeley, de jure 4th Baron Berkeley (1467–1523)
1526–1531	Robert Wingfield	Lieutenant 1523–1526, Lord Deputy 1526–1531. Sir William FitzWilliam was Captain of Calais Castle from 1526 to 1530, having been Captain of Guînes 1523–1526. In 1530 John Wallop was appointed lieutenant of Calais Castle.
1533–1540	Arthur Plantagenet, 1st Viscount Lisle	Lord Deputy. His stepson John Dudley was appointed deputy governor in 1538.
1540–1543	Lord Maltravers	Lord Deputy. Edward Bray was lieutenant of Calais Castle in 1541.
1544–1550	George Brooke, 9th Baron Cobham	Lord Deputy.
1550–1552	William Willoughby, 1st Baron Willoughby of Parham	Lord Deputy.
1552–1553	Lord William Howard	Lord Deputy.
1553–1558	Thomas Wentworth, 2nd Baron Wentworth	Lord Deputy, in charge when the French captured the town. Sir Ralph Chamberlaine was lieutenant of Calais Castle 1554–1558.
1555	William Herbert, 1st Earl of Pembroke (1501–1570)	In place as governor.

== See also ==
- Treasurer of Calais
