= Little Wenham Hall =

Medieval house in Little Wenham, England

Coordinates: 52°00′40″N 1°01′50″E

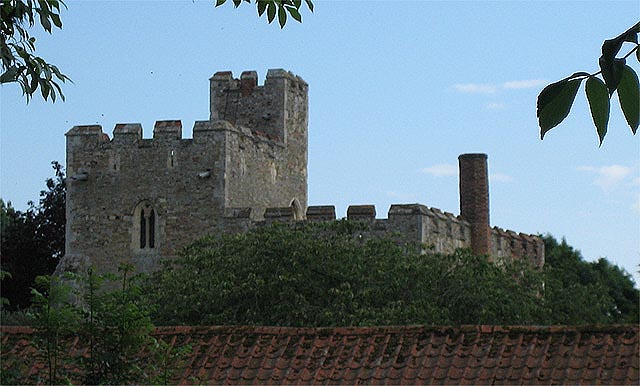
- Little Wenham Hall viewed from the churchyard
- Alternative names: Little Wenham Castle, Wenham Hall

General information
- Status: Completed
- Type: Manor house
- Architectural style: Gothic
- Location: Little Wenham, England

Technical details
- Material: Brick, Caen stone, septaria

Little Wenham Hall, also known as Little Wenham Castle, is a medieval house and grade I listed building in Little Wenham, Suffolk, England. It is notable for being an early example of a manor house without serious fortifications (i.e. not a castle), and one of the earliest large brick buildings in Britain. The house is not open to the public.

== History ==
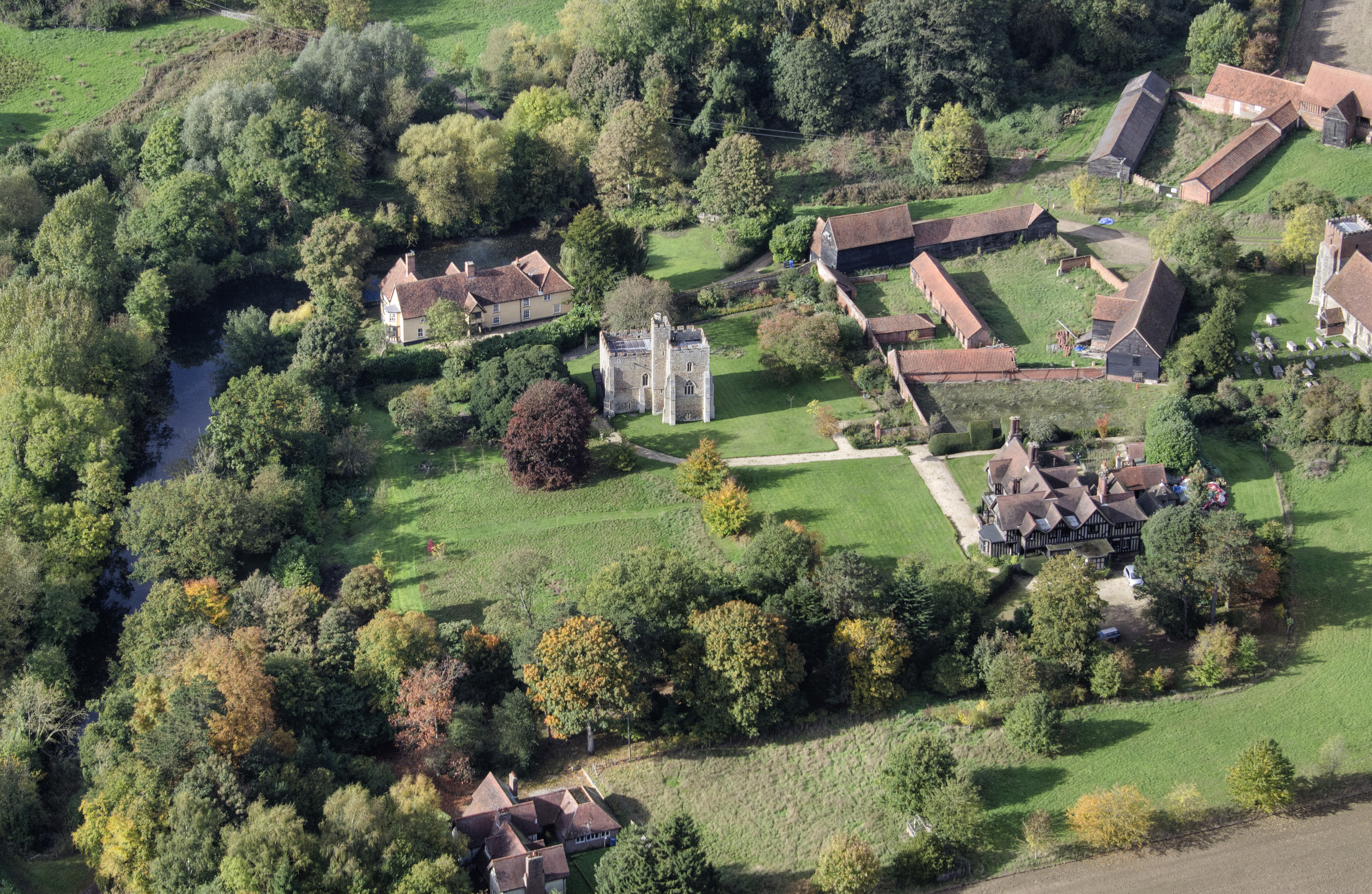
The hall from the air. The 16th century house and the "moat" are behind and to the left, while the church is to the far right.

The origins of the house are unclear, due to a lack of documentary evidence. However, on stylistic evidence its construction has been dated to c. 1260-80. Given this imprecision, the builder is also uncertain; possible candidates include Sir John de Vaux (the overlord after 1270), his daughter Petronilla de Nerford (c. 1259-1326) and Master Roger de Holebrook (possibly a priest or clerk, fl.1270-95). Edward Martin considers the latter the most likely due to his lengthy tenure during the probable construction period. The adjacent parish church was also remodelled at roughly this time, in a similar style to the house.

By 1361, the house belonged to Gilbert I de Debenham, a lawyer for the Black Prince, among others. In the Wars of the Roses, it was owned by his descendant Gilbert IV de Debenham, a notorious Yorkist, and was attacked in 1470 during the readeption of the Lancastrian Henry VI. His son Gilbert V de Debenham was also a Yorkist, and was attainted in 1495 for supporting Perkin Warbeck's rebellion. The house was altered in 1569 (datestone) by Sir John Brewse. These works consisted of the construction of a new house nearby, the renewal of the battlements and potentially the demolition of the adjacent hall, possibly in an effort to give the building a more "antique" and martial appearance. Sir John was an early supporter of Mary I, being knighted after she took the throne. In 1674, the house had 21 fireplaces, but the last inhabitant had left by 1765.

The house's architectural significance began to be recognised in the 19th century, when it began to be cited in works like Thomas Hudson Turner's Some Account of Domestic Architecture in England: from the Conquest to the End of the Thirteenth Century (1851) as a fine specimen of early domestic construction. This new-found appreciation led to repairs and restoration by Frederick and George Crisp after they purchased the building in 1884.

== Architecture ==
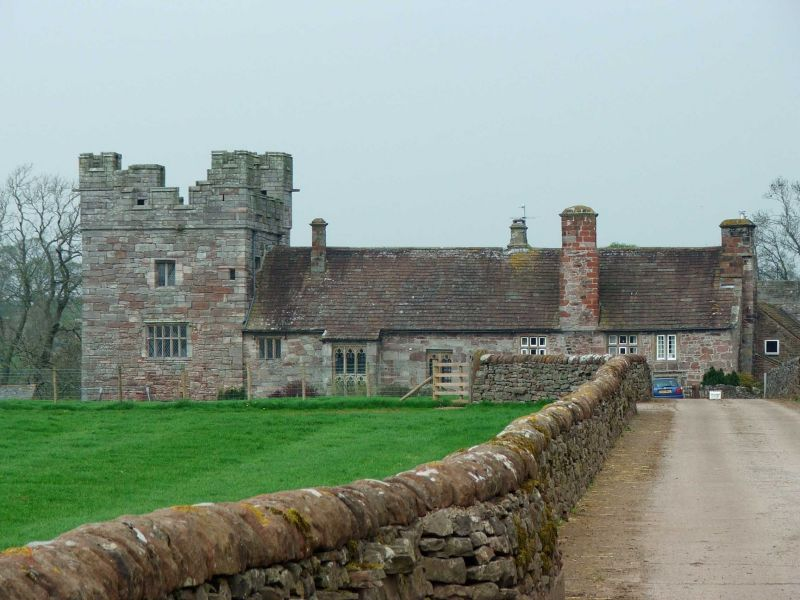
Yanwath Hall, Cumbria. Little Weham may have had a hall similarly attached to the tower.

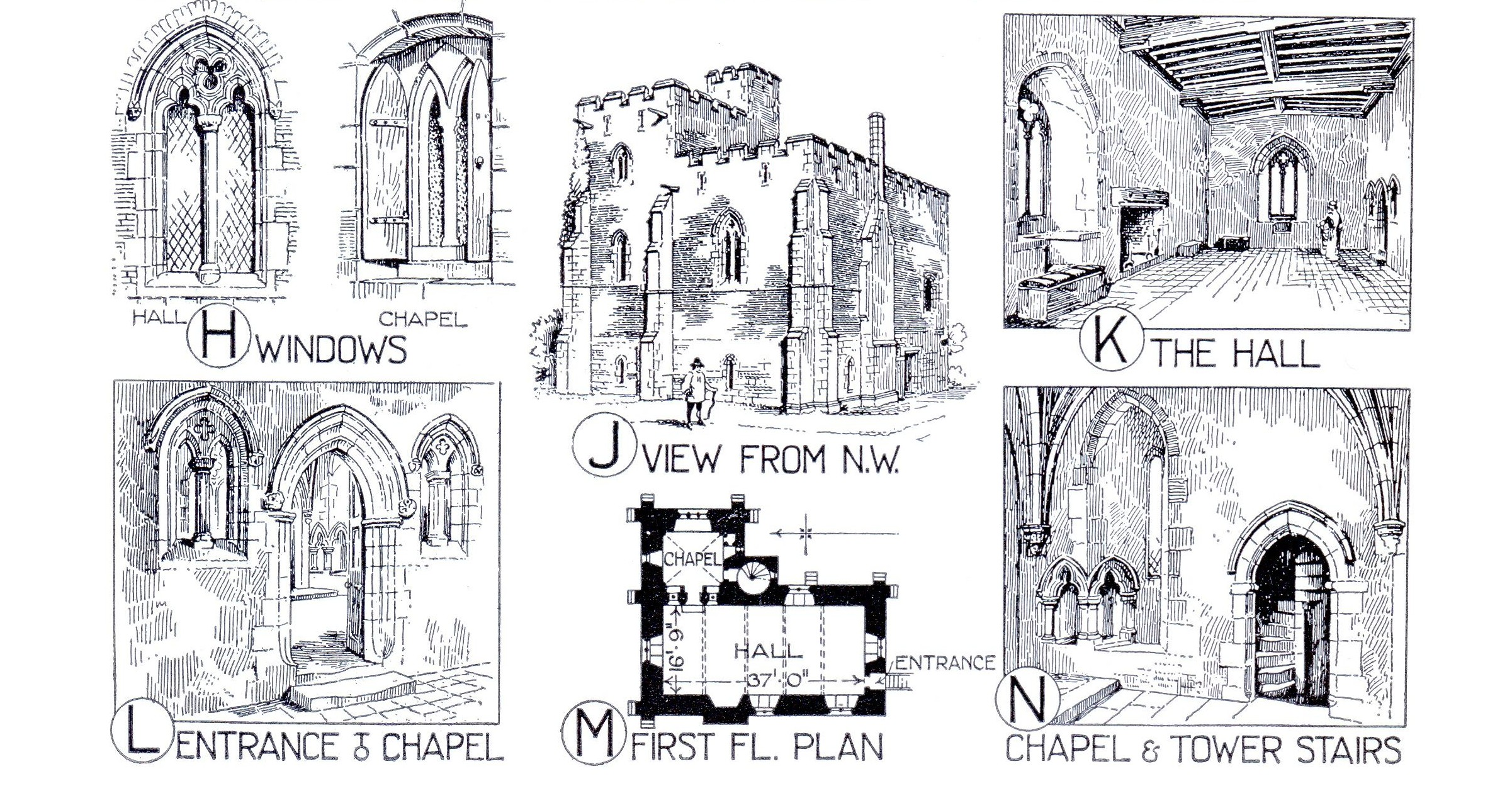
The house as drawn by Banister Fletcher. Note that the main first floor room is labelled as a hall.

The house consists of an embattled two storey brick tower with a taller side wing, over a septaria stone base. There is a stair turret in the angle between the two wings. The principal rooms are on the first floor, following usual medieval practice, with vaulted undercrofts below. There are further, less impressive chambers on the second floor. The identity of the larger first floor room has been the subject of debate. For much of the 19th and 20th centuries, it was believed that this was a first floor hall (with sleeping accommodation on the second floor of the side wing), a view espoused by historians including Turner and Margaret Wood. The notion of first floor halls has since been challenged, and the present structure is now more commonly considered as a chamber block, with the main room forming the solar, attached to a now-demolished timber framed hall. Evidence for this interpretation includes blocked doorways and the lack of a string course or buttresses to the south-west corner, where a hall may have abutted. A similar arrangement survives at the roughly coeval Longthorpe Tower, near Peterborough.

The room in the wing is a rib-vaulted chapel. Its dedication has been suggested as being St Petronilla, on the basis of a carved vault boss and John de Vaux's daughter being her namesake, but firm evidence for this is scant. The chapel has windows with bar tracery, a more up-to-date form than the plate tracery of the larger room. This combination of tracery places its date at the transition between Early English and Decorated Gothic, i.e. the later 13th century. The connection between the chapel and the main room consists of an arched door flanked by plate-traceried openings, an unusual form generally found in monastic chapter houses. Above the chapel is an unheated room, probably a sleeping chamber. The whole edifice is topped by battlements (with arrow slits unusually positioned below the crenels), giving the building an aggressive appearance that belies its limited military capacity. This appearance would have been somewhat less stark before the demolition of the possible hall, though the house may also have been defended by a moat (it is unclear whether the present body of water is part of a moat or a later millpond).

Little Wenham Hall represents a very early example of English brick building, and has been cited as 'probably the earliest brick dwelling house of its kind in England.' The art of brickmaking had been lost after the departure of the Romans, but began to be revived in 12th century East Anglia, notably at Coggeshall Abbey (Essex), due to a lack of good local building stone and connections with the Low Countries, which already had an extensive brick industry. At Coggeshall the brick was used to form quoins and dressings in place of ashlar, on an otherwise flint building, but the Beauchamp Tower at the Tower of London (completed 1281) used brick as an infill, behind a more expensive stone facing. The bricks at the Beauchamp Tower were imported from Flanders, which may also have been the case at Little Wenham, though there they are considered more likely to be locally made. The bricks are around 9 by 4 1/2 by 2 inches (23 by 11 by 5cm) in size. The brickwork is very irregular, varying in size and colour; the standard bonds had yet to be developed.
