= Crown post =

Feature of timber-based buildings

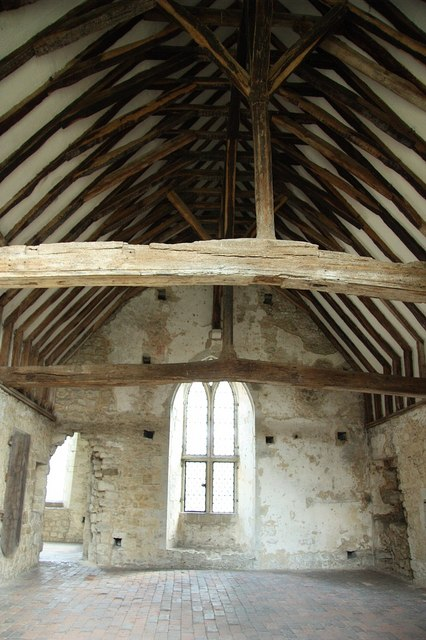
Crown post roof in the solar at Old Soar Manor in Kent in 2009: the crown post is the upright above the tie beam. It carries a beam called the crown plate which in turn supports the collar beams. There are braces between the collar beams and common rafters and from the crown posts to these braces.

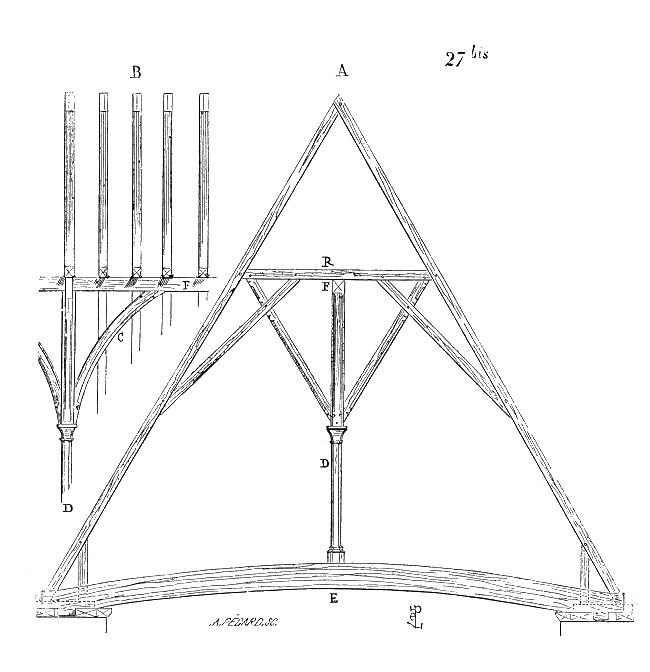
A crown post roof in the Dictionary of French Architecture from 11th to 16th Century (1856) (Dictionnaire raisonné de l’architecture française du XIe au XVIe siècle a French language dictionary) by Eugène Viollet-le-Duc. A. section view, B. longitudinal view, C. curved brace, D. crown post, E. cambered tie beam, F. collar plate, R collar beam.

A crown post is a term in traditional timber framing for a post in roof framing which stands on a tie beam or collar beam and supports a collar plate. Historically, crown posts were called king posts, but this usage is confusing and obsolete. A crown post is designed to be in a compression and transfers weight to the tie beam, where a king post is designed to be in tension and supports the tie beam. In the U.K a crown strut is similar to a crown post but does not carry a plate.

== Historical Context ==
The use of crown post roofs became prominent in medieval England, particularly during the late medieval period. These roofs were commonly found in high-status buildings such as manor houses and large farm structures, where they provided both structural support and aesthetic appeal. One of the most famous examples is the crown post roof at Old Soar Manor, which showcases the typical design used in the 13th century.

Crown posts were part of a broader European timber-framing tradition that saw variations across regions. In France, for example, the crown post system was studied in detail by the 19th-century architect Eugène Viollet-le-Duc in his Dictionnaire raisonné de l’architecture française. Viollet-le-Duc's work provides an essential historical and technical account of how these roofs were constructed during the 11th to 16th centuries. In Germany, similar systems were employed, though local variations in roof framing techniques led to different structural forms, such as the use of queen posts or hammerbeam roofs.

The design of crown post roofs was essential in distributing the weight of the roof evenly across the structure. The post itself is always in compression, transferring the load directly to the tie beam, thus providing additional stability and allowing for wider spans than would be possible with simpler designs.

Today, crown post roofs are recognised as an important architectural feature of the medieval period, with many surviving examples protected under heritage conservation laws in the U.K. and elsewhere. Restoration efforts often focus on preserving the original timber framing while ensuring structural safety using modern techniques.
