= Listed buildings in Wenham Parva =

Civil Parish in Suffolk, England

Wenham Parva is a village and civil parish in the Babergh District of Suffolk, England. It contains 14 listed buildings that are recorded in the National Heritage List for England. Of these two are grade I, one is grade II* and eleven are grade II.

This list is based on the information retrieved online from Historic England.

== Key ==
Grade	Criteria
I	Buildings that are of exceptional interest
II*	Particularly important buildings of more than special interest
II	Buildings that are of special interest

== Listing ==
Name	Grade	Location	Type	Completed (Note: The date given is the date used by Historic England as significant for the initial building or that of an important part in the structure's description.)	Date designated	Grid ref. (Note: The grid reference is based on the British national grid reference system, sometimes known as OSGB36, used by the Ordnance Survey.) Geo-coordinates	Notes	Entry number (Note: The "List Entry Number" is a unique number assigned to each listed building and scheduled monument by Historic England.)	Image	Wikidata
Barn Approximately 150 Metres North of Little Wenham Castle and West of Church of St Lawrence	II*	Church Lane	barn		30 October 1990	TM0803539212; 52°00′44″N 1°01′48″E		1194552	Barn Approximately 150 Metres North of Little Wenham Castle and West of Church of St Lawrence More images	Q17534001
Church of St Lawrence, Formerly Church of All Saints	I	Church Lane, Little Wenham	church building		22 February 1955	TM0809639171; 52°00′43″N 1°01′51″E		1033410	Church of St Lawrence, Formerly Church of All Saints More images	Q4729492
Farm Buildings Complex Approximately 50 Metres North of Little Wenham Castle Adjacent to South of the Churchyard	II	Church Lane			30 October 1990	TM0809239134; 52°00′42″N 1°01′51″E		1194648	Upload Photo	Q26489264
Farm Buildings Complex to West of Barn and Buildings Listed 3/80 Little Wenham Castle	II	Church Lane			30 October 1990	TM0804539125; 52°00′42″N 1°01′48″E		1351958	Upload Photo	Q26635018
Garden Wall Approximately 20 Metres North West of Little Wenham Castle	II	Church Lane			22 February 1955	TM0804739099; 52°00′41″N 1°01′48″E		1033406	Upload Photo	Q26284887
Little Wenham Castle	I	Church Lane	castle		22 February 1955	TM0807739069; 52°00′40″N 1°01′50″E		1033405	Little Wenham Castle More images	Q17541537
Little Wenham Hall Farmhouse	II	Church Lane			22 February 1955	TM0803739050; 52°00′39″N 1°01′48″E		1285599	Upload Photo	Q26574278
Table Tomb and Enclosing Railings Approximately 14 Metres South of South Wall of Chancel Church of St Lawrence	II	Church Lane			30 October 1990	TM0810339151; 52°00′42″N 1°01′52″E		1194704	Upload Photo	Q95069143
Wall and Gates Adjacent to Road, Enclosing Garden to North of Wenham Grange	II	Enclosing Garden To North Of Wenham Grange, Wenham Road			30 October 1990	TM0781940320; 52°01′20″N 1°01′39″E		1285586	Upload Photo	Q26574268
Wenham Grove Farmhouse	II	Off Days Road			30 October 1990	TM0864339341; 52°00′48″N 1°02′20″E		1194667	Upload Photo	Q26489282
Outbuilding, Probably A Former Dairy/bakehouse/brewhouse Adjacent to North of Wenham Lodge	II	Probably A Former Dairy/bakehouse/brewhouse Adjacent To North Of Wenham Lodge, Wenham Road			30 October 1990	TM0701439054; 52°00′41″N 1°00′54″E		1194677	Upload Photo	Q26489292
Cartlodge Adjacent to Road and Approximately 30 Metres North West of Wenham Lodge	II	Wenham Road			30 October 1990	TM0700339085; 52°00′42″N 1°00′54″E		1033408	Upload Photo	Q26284889
Wenham Grange	II	Wenham Road			30 October 1990	TM0783040308; 52°01′20″N 1°01′40″E		1033409	Upload Photo	Q26284890
Wenham Lodge	II	Wenham Road			30 October 1990	TM0701939045; 52°00′40″N 1°00′54″E		1033407	Upload Photo	Q26284888

== See also ==
- Grade I listed buildings in Suffolk
- Grade II* listed buildings in Suffolk

== Sources ==
- Bettely, James; Pevsner, Nikolaus (2015) [1961], Suffolk: West, The Buildings of England, New Haven and London: Yale University Press, ISBN 978-0-300-19655-9
