= Listed buildings in Plaxtol =

Historic structures in Kent, England

Plaxtol is a village and civil parish in the borough of Tonbridge and Malling of Kent, England. It contains two grade I, five grade II* and 61 grade II listed buildings that are recorded in the National Heritage List for England.

This list is based on the information retrieved online from Historic England.

== Key ==
Grade	Criteria
I	Buildings that are of exceptional interest
II*	Particularly important buildings of more than special interest
II	Buildings that are of special interest

== Listing ==
Name	Grade	Location	Type	Completed (Note: The date given is the date used by Historic England as significant for the initial building or that of an important part in the structure's description.)	Date designated	Grid ref. (Note: The grid reference is based on the British national grid reference system, sometimes known as OSGB36, used by the Ordnance Survey.) Geo-coordinates	Notes	Entry number (Note: The "List Entry Number" is a unique number assigned to each listed building and scheduled monument by Historic England.)	Image	Wikidata
Barn 30 Yards To The East Of Old Allens	II	Allens Land			1 August 1952	TQ6146453394; 51°15′25″N 0°18′45″E		1072680	Upload Photo	Q26328502
Old Allens	II	Allens Lane			1 August 1952	TQ6145053383; 51°15′24″N 0°18′44″E		1072679	Upload Photo	Q26328500
Landway Farmhouse	II	Basted Lane			3 May 1984	TQ6128755545; 51°16′34″N 0°18′39″E		1072681	Upload Photo	Q26328505
Wall 10 Yards To The North Of The Grange	II	Bordering Road, Grange Hill			3 May 1984	TQ6041053907; 51°15′42″N 0°17′52″E		1362021	Upload Photo	Q26643957
Buttons Bourne Farmhouse	II	Bourne Lane			3 May 1984	TQ6098354805; 51°16′11″N 0°18′23″E		1072682	Upload Photo	Q26328507
Lavender Cottage And Buddleia Cottage	II	Church Hill, TN15 0QB			3 May 1984	TQ6024653551; 51°15′31″N 0°17′43″E		1072683	Upload Photo	Q26328509
Baldwin Family Tomb In Plaxtol Churchyard 20 Yards North Of West End	II	Church Hill			3 May 1984	TQ6018953658; 51°15′34″N 0°17′40″E		1204484	Upload Photo	Q26499923
Church House	II	Church Hill			3 May 1984	TQ6020953610; 51°15′33″N 0°17′41″E		1362059	Upload Photo	Q26643992
Plaxtol Church	II*	Church Hill			3 May 1984	TQ6019553640; 51°15′34″N 0°17′40″E		1072684	Plaxtol Church More images	Q17546840
Golding Farm Cottage	II	Crowhurst Lane, TN15 8PE			3 May 1984	TQ6021055382; 51°16′30″N 0°17′44″E		1072685	Upload Photo	Q26328510
Crowhurst Farmhouse	II	Crowhurst Lane			3 May 1984	TQ6026155767; 51°16′43″N 0°17′47″E		1204498	Upload Photo	Q26499939
Barn 30 Yards To The East Of Dux Farmhouse	II	Dux Lane			17 August 1983	TQ6085554064; 51°15′47″N 0°18′15″E		1204507	Upload Photo	Q26499948
Bourne Cottage	II	Dux Lane			3 May 1984	TQ6099254096; 51°15′48″N 0°18′22″E		1072686	Upload Photo	Q26328513
Dux Farmhouse	II	Dux Lane			3 May 1984	TQ6081454039; 51°15′46″N 0°18′13″E		1362060	Upload Photo	Q26643993
Shode House	II	Dux Lane			3 May 1984	TQ6097354096; 51°15′48″N 0°18′21″E		1204503	Upload Photo	Q26499944
Barn And Oast House 20 Yards To The East Of The Grange	II	Grange Hill			21 March 1984	TQ6047053900; 51°15′42″N 0°17′55″E		1204540	Upload Photo	Q26499976
Nut Tree Hall	II	Grange Hill			1 August 1952	TQ6035053871; 51°15′41″N 0°17′48″E		1204560	Upload Photo	Q26499992
The Grange	II*	Grange Hill			1 August 1952	TQ6043253892; 51°15′42″N 0°17′53″E		1072687	Upload Photo	Q17546846
Tree House	II	Grange Hill			1 August 1952	TQ6025053921; 51°15′43″N 0°17′43″E		1072688	Upload Photo	Q26328515
Salmons Farmhouse	II	Long Mill Lane, Dunks Green			3 May 1984	TQ6112852861; 51°15′08″N 0°18′27″E		1072690	Upload Photo	Q26328519
Barton's Cottages	II	1-6, Long Mill Lane, Dunks Green			3 May 1984	TQ6114352812; 51°15′06″N 0°18′28″E		1204604	Upload Photo	Q26500032
Oast Houses 30 Yards South Of Winfield Farmhouse	II	Long Mill Lane			3 May 1984	TQ6191055178; 51°16′22″N 0°19′11″E		1281147	Upload Photo	Q26570218
Spoute House	II*	Long Mill Lane			3 May 1984	TQ6115053650; 51°15′33″N 0°18′29″E		1204588	Upload Photo	Q17546902
Walnut Tree Cottage	II	Long Mill Lane			3 May 1984	TQ6195155217; 51°16′23″N 0°19′13″E		1072689	Upload Photo	Q26328518
Wellington	II	Long Mill Lane			3 May 1984	TQ6114752791; 51°15′05″N 0°18′28″E		1362023	Upload Photo	Q26643959
Winfield Farmhouse	II	Long Mill Lane			31 July 1979	TQ6191055216; 51°16′23″N 0°19′11″E		1362022	Upload Photo	Q26643958
Broadfield Farmhouse	II	Old Soar Road			1 August 1952	TQ6183653658; 51°15′33″N 0°19′05″E		1204647	Upload Photo	Q26500068
Old Soar	I	Old Soar Road			3 May 1984	TQ6195054103; 51°15′47″N 0°19′11″E		1281122	Old Soar More images	Q7084990
Old Soar Farmhouse	II	Old Soar Road			1 August 1952	TQ6194254095; 51°15′47″N 0°19′11″E		1072691	Upload Photo	Q26328521
Church Cottage	II	Plaxtol Lane			3 May 1984	TQ6016653614; 51°15′33″N 0°17′39″E		1362024	Upload Photo	Q26643960
Old Graingers	II	Plaxtol Lane			3 May 1984	TQ6015153596; 51°15′33″N 0°17′38″E		1072692	Upload Photo	Q26328524
1-3, Church Row	II	Plaxtol Lane, TN15 0PZ			1 August 1952	TQ6016653638; 51°15′34″N 0°17′39″E		1204667	Upload Photo	Q26500088
4 And 5, Church Row	II	Plaxtol Lane, TN15 0PZ			1 August 1952	TQ6015153630; 51°15′34″N 0°17′38″E		1072693	Upload Photo	Q26328526
6 And 7, Church Row	II	Plaxtol Lane, TN15 0PZ			1 August 1952	TQ6013653626; 51°15′34″N 0°17′37″E		1204700	Upload Photo	Q26678920
The Plough Public House	II	Plough Hill, Basted			14 June 2001	TQ6079255643; 51°16′38″N 0°18′14″E		1271473	Upload Photo	Q26561419
Old Basted And Cottage Now Attached At West End	II	Plough Lane			1 August 1952	TQ6085455651; 51°16′38″N 0°18′17″E		1362025	Upload Photo	Q26643961
Lowyns	II	Roughway Lane, TN11 9SN			4 April 1975	TQ6187753000; 51°15′11″N 0°19′06″E		1072694	Upload Photo	Q26328529
Lowyns	II	Roughway Lane, TN11 9SN			3 May 1984	TQ6188053028; 51°15′12″N 0°19′06″E		1204712	Upload Photo	Q26500129
Lowyns	II	Roughway Lane, TN11 9SN			3 May 1984	TQ6185052997; 51°15′11″N 0°19′04″E		1362026	Upload Photo	Q26643962
Makefeyres	II	Roughway Lane, TN11 9SN			3 May 1984	TQ6201552961; 51°15′10″N 0°19′13″E		1204727	Upload Photo	Q26500143
Bridge Over The River Bourne At Roughways	II	Roughway Lane			20 September 1976	TQ6157952689; 51°15′02″N 0°18′50″E		1204706	Upload Photo	Q17650083
Croucher's Cottage	II	Roughway Lane			3 May 1984	TQ6219853032; 51°15′12″N 0°19′22″E		1072696	Upload Photo	Q26328534
Lower Roughway Farmhouse	II	Roughway Lane			1 August 1952	TQ6198852968; 51°15′10″N 0°19′11″E		1072695	Upload Photo	Q26328532
Rats Castle	II*	Roughway Lane			1 August 1952	TQ6255553083; 51°15′13″N 0°19′41″E		1362027	Upload Photo	Q17547091
Upper Farm Farmhouse	II	Roughway Lane			3 May 1984	TQ6224753022; 51°15′12″N 0°19′25″E		1204741	Upload Photo	Q26500156
Former Schoolmasters House	II	School Lane			3 May 1984	TQ6026453501; 51°15′29″N 0°17′43″E		1204746	Upload Photo	Q26500161
Ragstone Cottage	II	School Lane			3 May 1984	TQ6025853520; 51°15′30″N 0°17′43″E		1362028	Upload Photo	Q26643963
Rose And Crown Cottage	II	Sheet Hill			19 March 1984	TQ6003654352; 51°15′57″N 0°17′33″E		1204752	Upload Photo	Q26500166
Weavers Cottage	II	Sheet Hill, TN15 0PU			3 May 1984	TQ6006454287; 51°15′55″N 0°17′34″E		1362030	Upload Photo	Q26643965
Shields Cottages And High Hope	II	1-3, The Street, Sevenoaks, TN15 0QH			3 May 1984	TQ6054753482; 51°15′28″N 0°17′58″E		1362031	Upload Photo	Q26643966
Forge Cottage	II	The Street			1 August 1952	TQ6029653540; 51°15′31″N 0°17′45″E		1072709	Upload Photo	Q26328568
Manderley	II	The Street			3 May 1984	TQ6106953614; 51°15′32″N 0°18′25″E		1072707	Upload Photo	Q26328563
Pendle Cottage	II	The Street			3 May 1984	TQ6028853541; 51°15′31″N 0°17′45″E		1362032	Upload Photo	Q26643967
Periwick Cottage	II	The Street			31 January 2005	TQ6050053506; 51°15′29″N 0°17′56″E		1391222	Upload Photo	Q26670591
The Forge Restaurant	II	The Street			1 August 1952	TQ6027753553; 51°15′31″N 0°17′44″E		1072710	Upload Photo	Q26328570
Wickenden Farmhouse	II	The Street			3 May 1984	TQ6071753511; 51°15′29″N 0°18′07″E		1072708	Upload Photo	Q26328564
Fairlawne	I	Tonbridge Road			1 August 1952	TQ5943653430; 51°15′28″N 0°17′01″E		1072711	Upload Photo	Q17530246
Lodge And Gatepiers 100 Yards West Of Fairlawne	II	Tonbridge Road			3 May 1984	TQ5927753479; 51°15′30″N 0°16′53″E		1362033	Upload Photo	Q26643968
Ashenden And Garden Wall	II	Tree Lane			1 August 1952	TQ6020653757; 51°15′38″N 0°17′41″E		1072712	Upload Photo	Q26328573
Clakkers Hall	II*	Winfield Lane			13 July 1973	TQ6125155496; 51°16′33″N 0°18′38″E		1281020	Upload Photo	Q17547036
Claygate House	II	Winfield Lane			3 May 1984	TQ6122055372; 51°16′29″N 0°18′36″E		1362034	Upload Photo	Q26643969
Bartons Farmhouse	II	Yopps Green			1 August 1952	TQ6017654008; 51°15′46″N 0°17′40″E		1204953	Upload Photo	Q26500344
Cottage 10 Yards To The South Of Bartons Farmhouse	II	Yopps Green			3 May 1984	TQ6018653992; 51°15′45″N 0°17′40″E		1072714	Upload Photo	Q26328578
Elm Tree Cottage And White Beam	II	Yopps Green			3 May 1984	TQ6022953969; 51°15′45″N 0°17′42″E		1362035	Upload Photo	Q26643970
Little Damas	II	Yopps Green			3 May 1984	TQ6021453939; 51°15′44″N 0°17′42″E		1204810	Upload Photo	Q26500218
Oast House And Wall 20 Yards To The North East Of Bartons Farmhouse	II	Yopps Green			3 May 1984	TQ6019554026; 51°15′46″N 0°17′41″E		1072715	Upload Photo	Q26328579
Tree Cottage	II	Yopps Green			3 May 1984	TQ6021353963; 51°15′44″N 0°17′42″E		1072713	Upload Photo	Q26328575
Waggon Shed And Wall 20 Yards To The South East Of Bartons Farmhouse	II	Yopps Green			3 May 1984	TQ6020353995; 51°15′45″N 0°17′41″E		1280936	Upload Photo	Q26570024

== See also ==
- Grade I listed buildings in Kent
- Grade II* listed buildings in Kent

== Sources ==
- Newman, John (2012) [1969], Kent: West and the Weald, The Buildings of England, New Haven and London: Yale University Press, ISBN 978-0-300-18509-6
