= Margaret Wood =

Margaret Wood may refer to:

- Margaret Wood (courtier), servant of Anne of Denmark and nun
- Margaret Wood Bancroft (1893–1986), American naturalist and explorer
- Margaret Wood (archaeologist) (born 1908), English archaeologist
- Margaret Wood (fashion designer) (born 1950), Navajo-Seminole fashion designer
- Maggie Hassan (Margaret Coldwell Wood, born 1958), American politician
