= Great chamber =

Ceremonial centre of a manor or castle

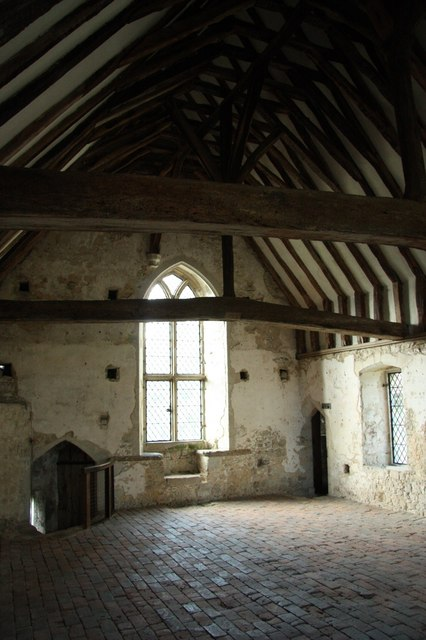
The great chamber of Old Soar Manor

The great chamber was the second most important room in a medieval or Tudor English castle, palace, mansion, or manor house after the great hall. Medieval great halls were the ceremonial centre of the household and were not private at all; the gentlemen attendants and the servants would come and go all the time. The great chamber was at the dais end of the hall, usually up a staircase. It was the first room which offered the lord of the household some privacy from his own staff, albeit not total privacy. In the Middle Ages the great chamber was an all-purpose reception and living room. The family might take some meals in it, though the great hall was the main eating room. In modest manor houses it sometimes also served as the main bedroom.

Evidence of chamber blocks separate to the hall can be seen as far back as the 10th century, for example in the excavated manor at Sulgrave, Northamptonshire. Upper chambers are also depicted in the Bayeux Tapestry, such as in scene 3, where Harold Godwinson is feasting in his chamber at Bosham. After the Norman Conquest, plans of large houses became more integrated, and the great chamber assumed its standard place at the end of the hall. Some chamber blocks were built of stone and have survived, though the timber halls to which they were attached have vanished. This has led to confusion, with earlier historians like Margaret Wood seeing them as first floor halls. Examples include Burton Agnes Old Hall, Boothby Pagnell Manor, Hemingford Grey Manor and the School of Pythagoras in Cambridge. This development continued in the 13th century, though the halls became more frequently of stone, as at Old Soar Manor, of c.1280-90. Old Soar illustrates another development of the time, the addition of smaller rooms attached to the great chamber - in this case, a garderobe and a chapel. At this time, the standard plan of a manor had a single block attached to the hall, with the chamber "above" and the services "below".

This was to change in the later Middle Ages, when the H-plan became the norm: the great chamber lay over the parlour at the upper end of the hall, while over the services would be a lesser chamber for an official. In magnate houses, the great chamber was the centre of elaborate later medieval rituals, as the room in which guests were entertained and intimate meals were eaten. The chamber also had great significance in the culture of courtly romance, for instance in Sir Gawain and the Green Knight, where it is the site of Gawain's temptation. As the great chamber became a reception room, it was designed more for impressing visitors, as at Haddon Hall, where it gained an elaborate new roof and oriel window. The presence of the great bed defined the chamber, being partly seen as an extension of the owner's personality in a way that was not the case in the fully-public hall.

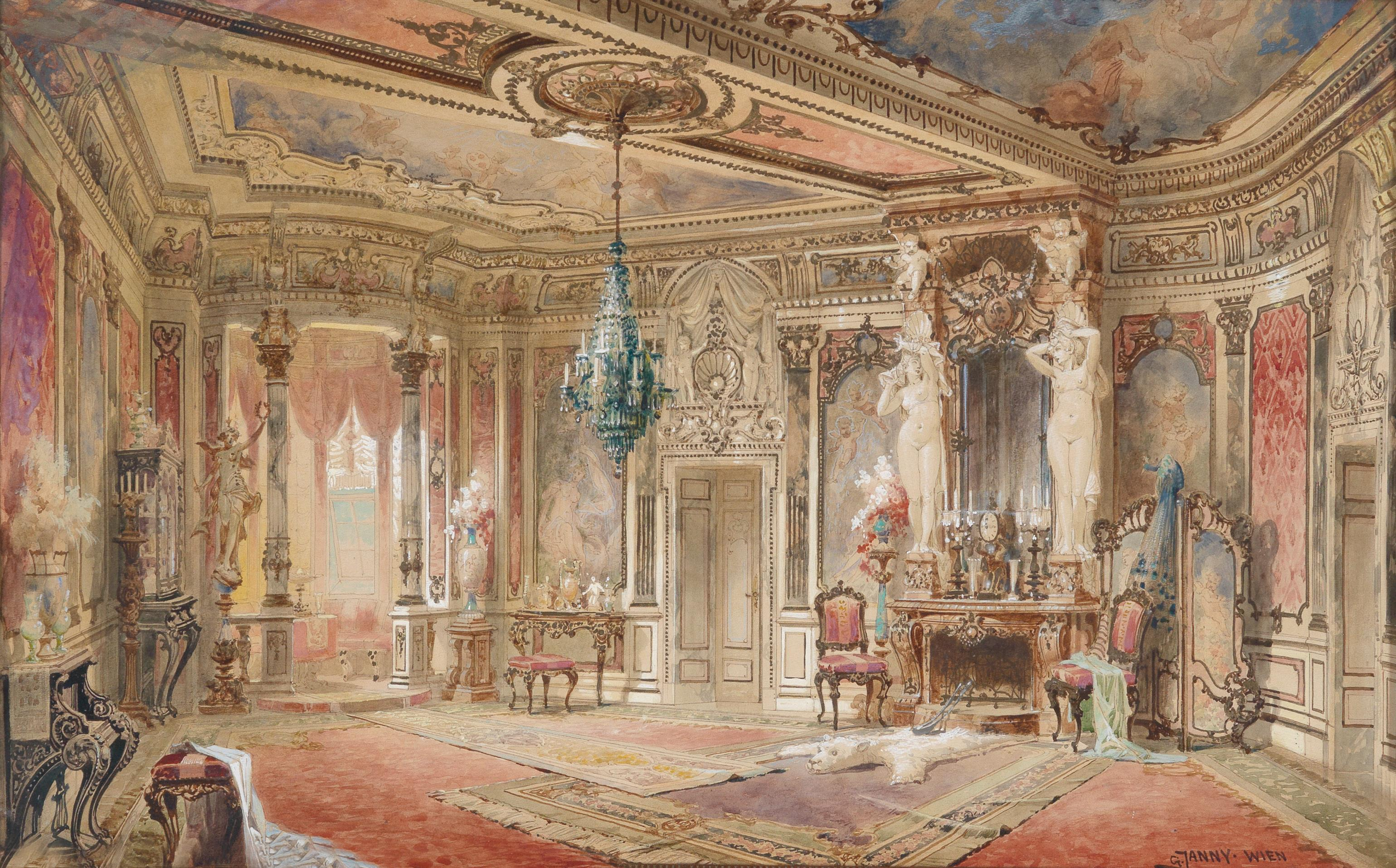
Georg Janny, Salon in Makartstil

By the seventeenth century communal meals in the hall had been abandoned and the great chamber was the best dining room. There was often a more modest room called the parlour, where the family took its meals when eating alone. Large houses gradually acquired a greater range of specialised living rooms, such as libraries, drawing rooms, and music rooms. By the early 18th century, great chambers had been replaced by rooms called "saloons", and these soon lost their function as dining rooms.

Many great chambers survive. Hardwick Hall has a very large and little-altered example from around 1600. In many other cases they were redecorated and given more specialised functions as drawing rooms or ballrooms or libraries.

== Gallery ==
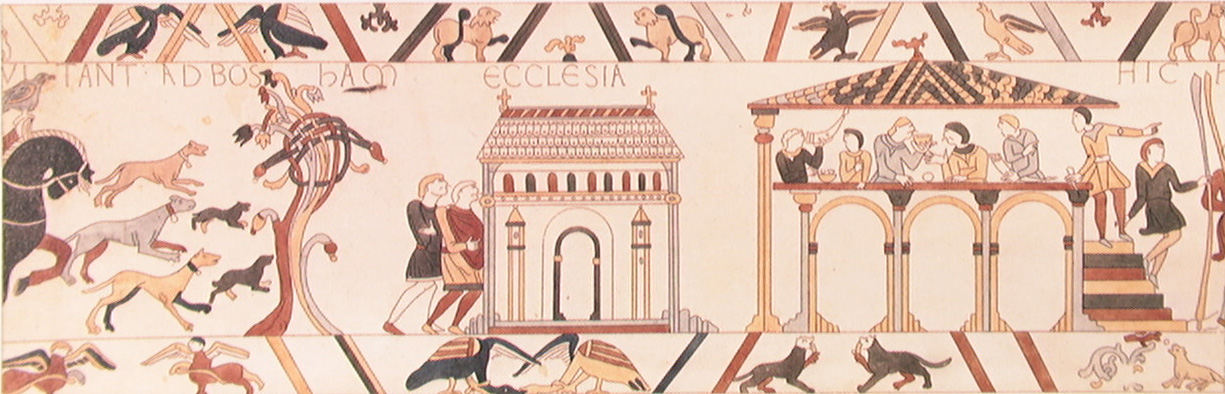
Harold in his chamber at Bosham (to the right).

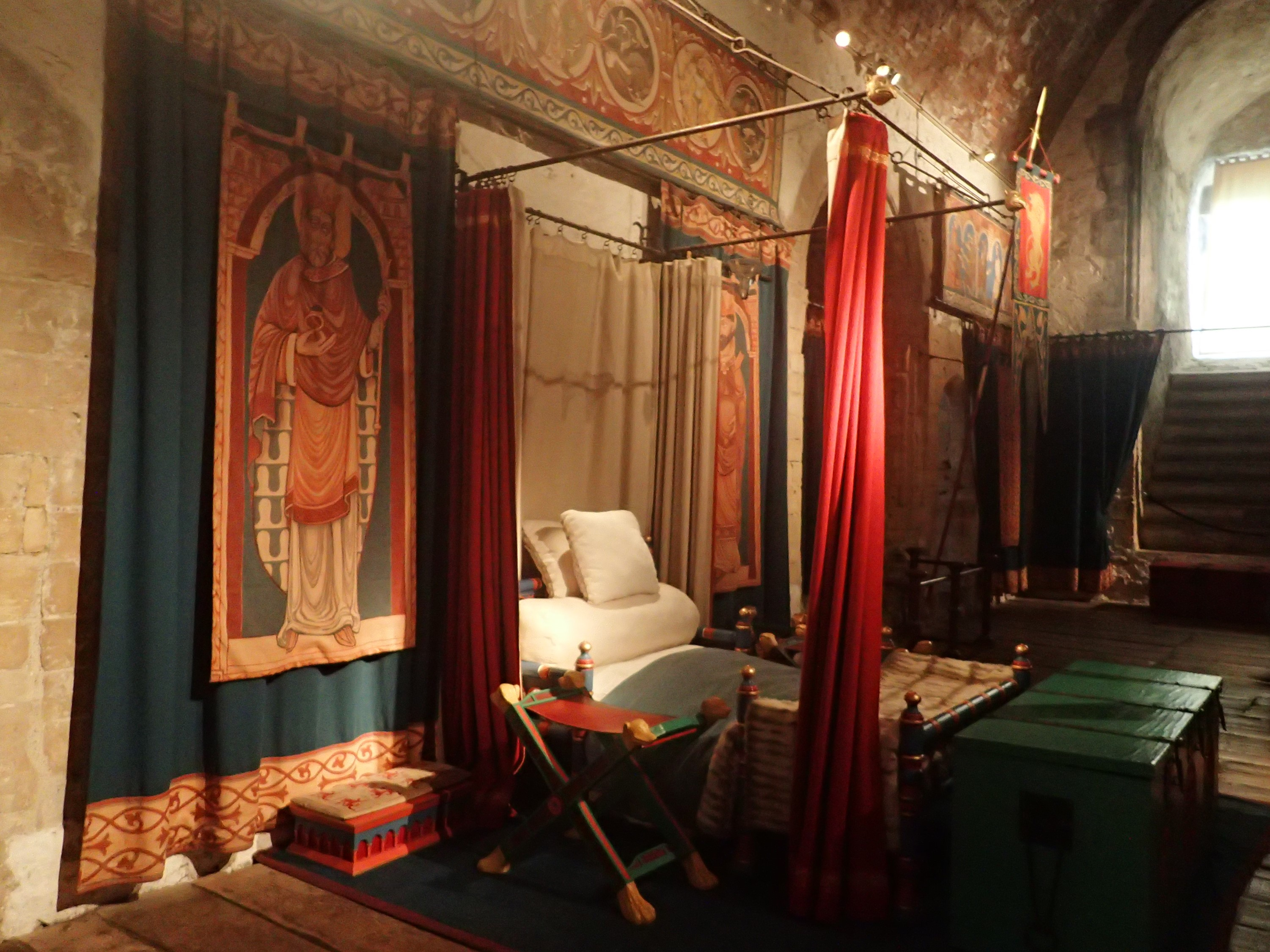
The King's Chamber at Dover Castle (12th century).

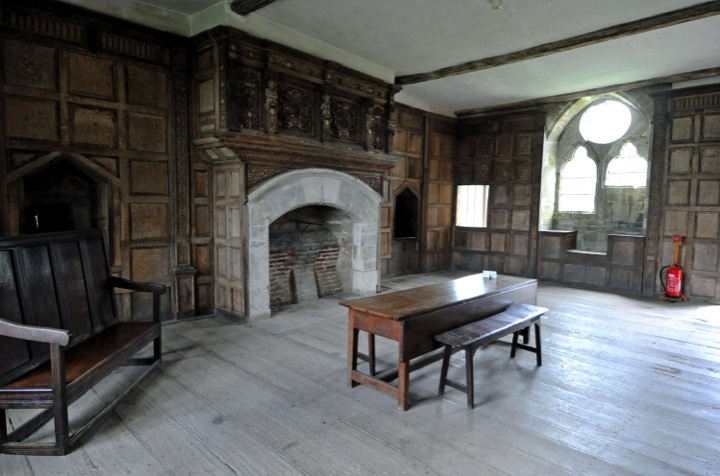
Solar at Stokesay Castle (13th century). The panelling is a 17th century insertion.

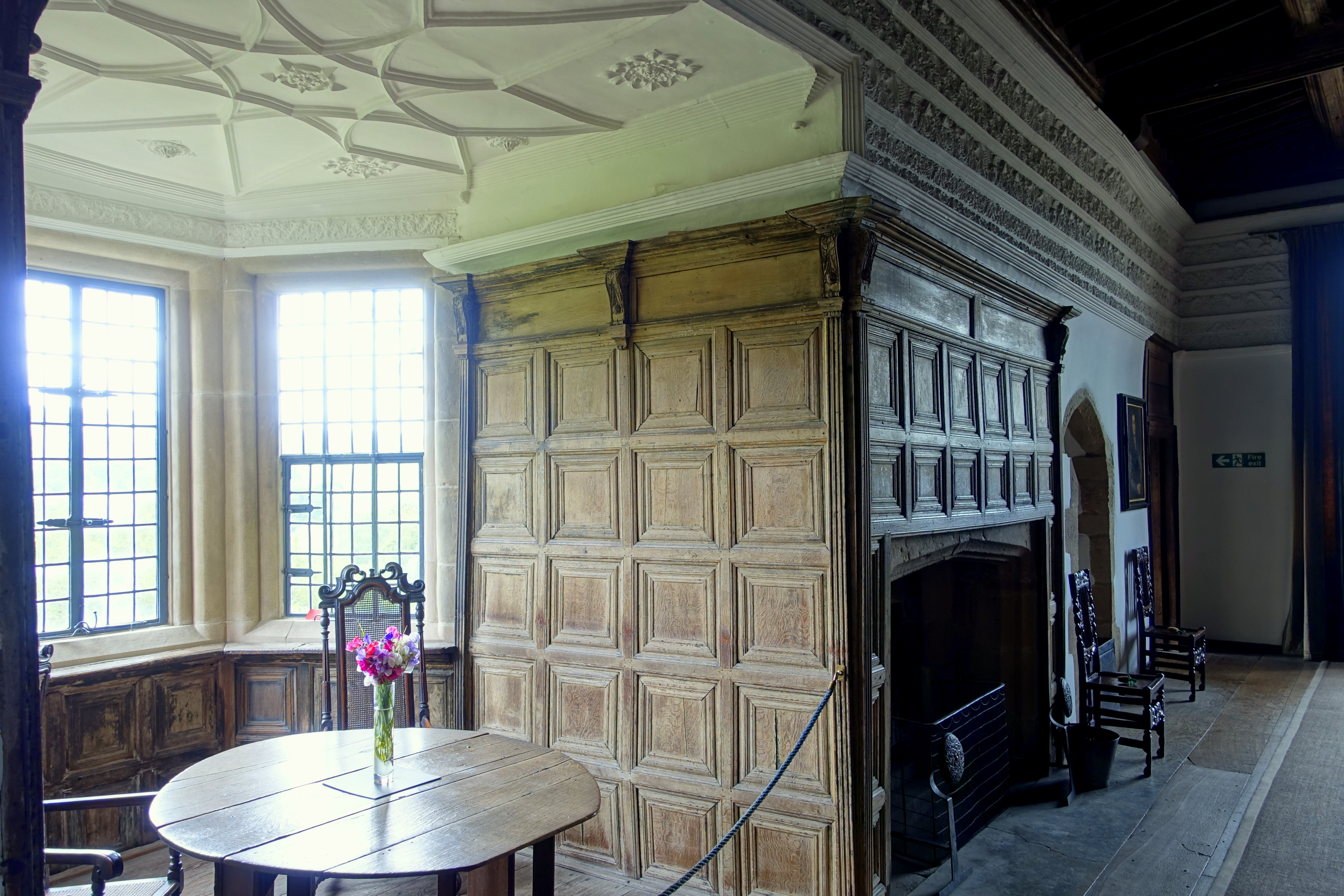
The Great Chamber at Haddon Hall (16th century).

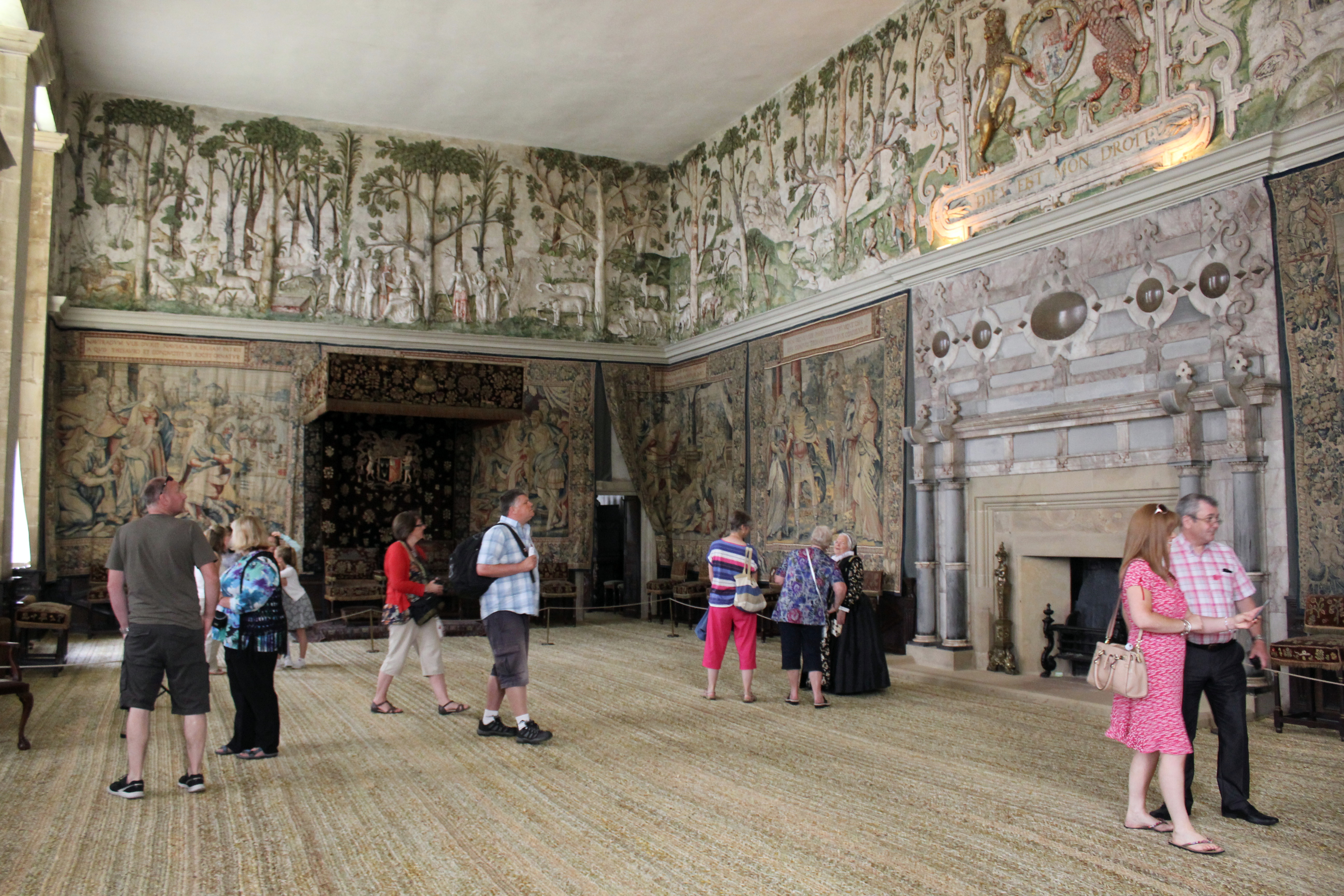
The High Great Chamber at Hardwick Hall.
