= King post =

Central vertical post used in architectural or bridge designs

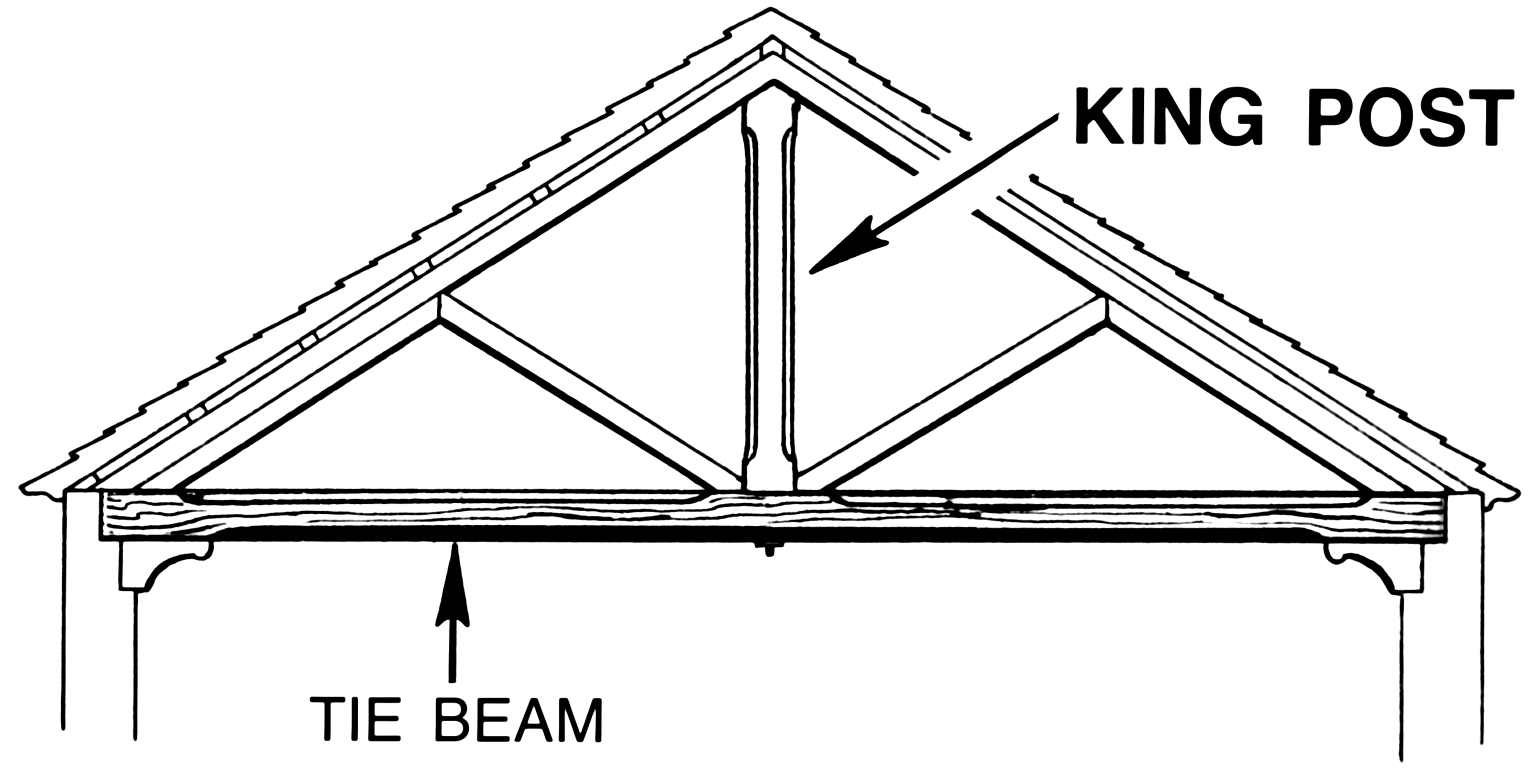
The king post is the central, vertical member of the truss.

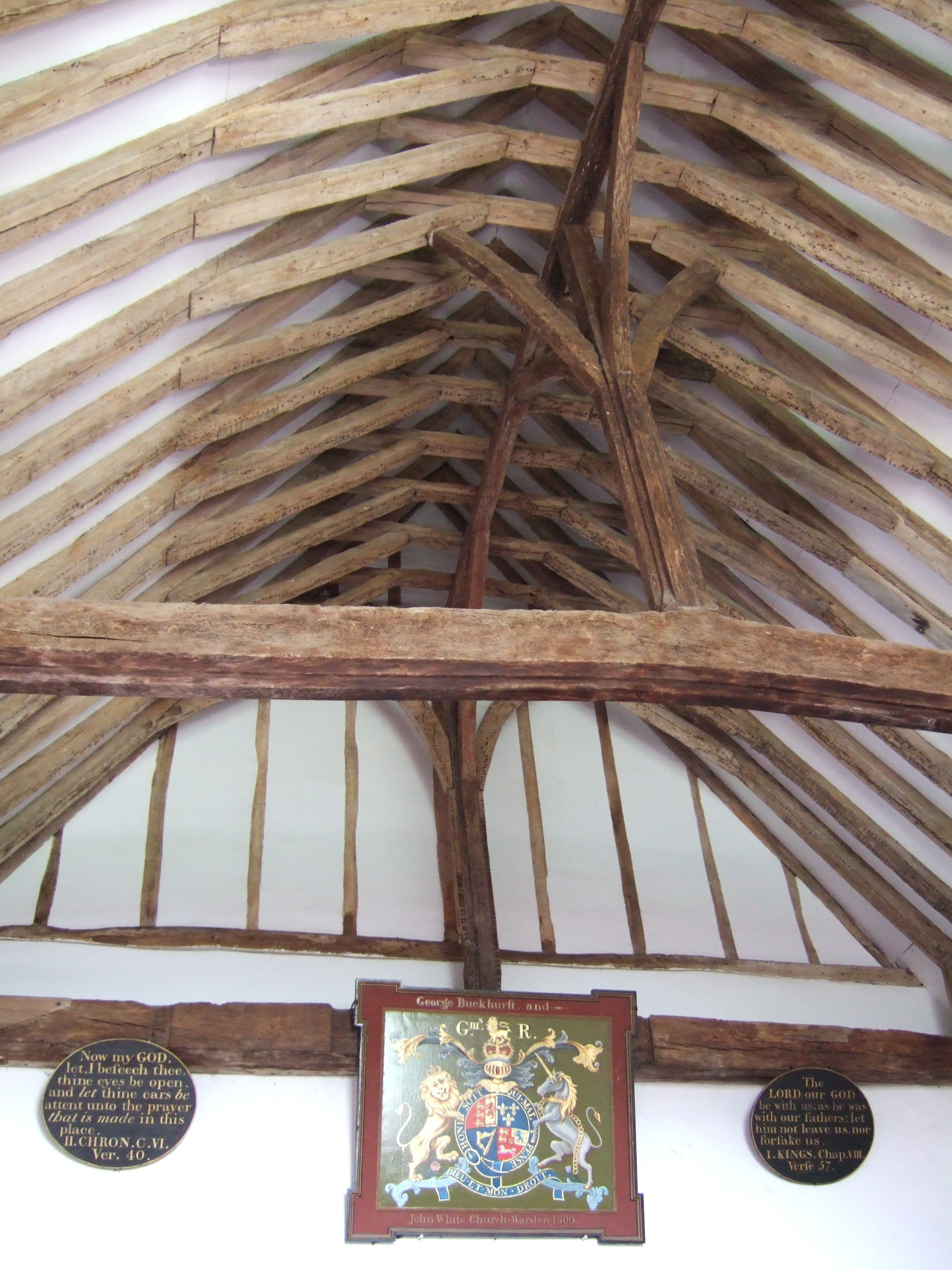
Crown posts in the nave roof at Old Romney church, Kent, England

A king post (or king-post or kingpost) is a central vertical post used in architectural or bridge designs, working in tension to support a beam below from a truss apex above (whereas a crown post, though visually similar, supports items above from the beam below).

In aircraft design a strut called a king post acts in compression, similarly to an architectural crown post. Usage in mechanical plant and marine engineering differs again, as noted below.

== Architecture ==
King post truss

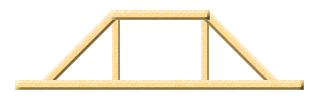
Queen post truss

A king post extends vertically from a crossbeam (the tie beam) to the apex of a triangular truss. The king post, itself in tension, connects the apex of the truss with its base, holding up the tie beam (also in tension) at the base of the truss. The post can be replaced with an iron rod called a king rod (or king bolt) and thus a king rod truss. The king post truss is also called a "Latin truss".

In traditional timber framing, a crown post looks similar to a king post, but it is very different structurally: whereas the king post is in tension, usually supporting the tie beam as a truss, the crown post is supported by the tie beam and is in compression. The crown post rises to a crown plate immediately below collar beams which it supports; it does not rise to the apex like a king post. Historically a crown post was called a king post in England but this usage is obsolete.

An alternative truss construction uses two queen posts (or queen-posts). These vertical posts, positioned along the base of the truss, are supported by the sloping sides of the truss, rather than reaching its apex. A development adds a collar beam above the queen posts, which are then termed queen struts. A section of the tie beam between the queen posts may be removed to create a hammerbeam roof.

== King post truss ==
A diagram of the parts of a king post truss

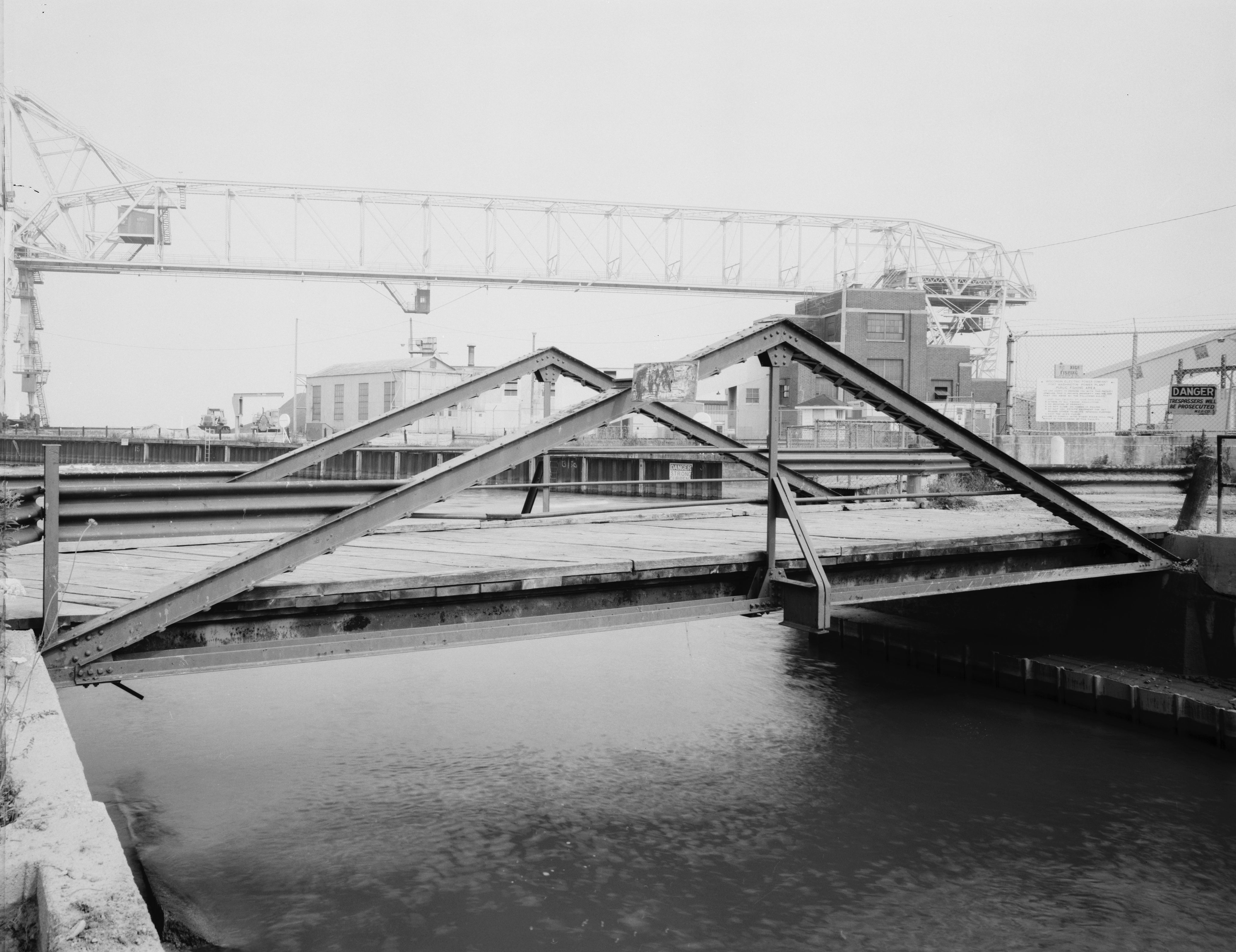
A king post truss bridge

The king post truss is used for simple roof trusses and short-span bridges. It is the simplest form of truss in that it is constructed of the fewest truss members (individual lengths of wood or metal). The truss consists of two diagonal members that meet at the apex of the truss, one horizontal beam that serves to tie the bottom end of the diagonals together, and the king post which connects the apex to the horizontal beam below. For a roof truss, the diagonal members are called rafters, and the horizontal member may serve as a ceiling joist. A bridge would require two king post trusses with the driving surface between them. A roof usually uses many side-by-side trusses depending on the size of the structure.

Pont-y-Cafnau, the world's first iron railway bridge, is of the king post type.

== History ==
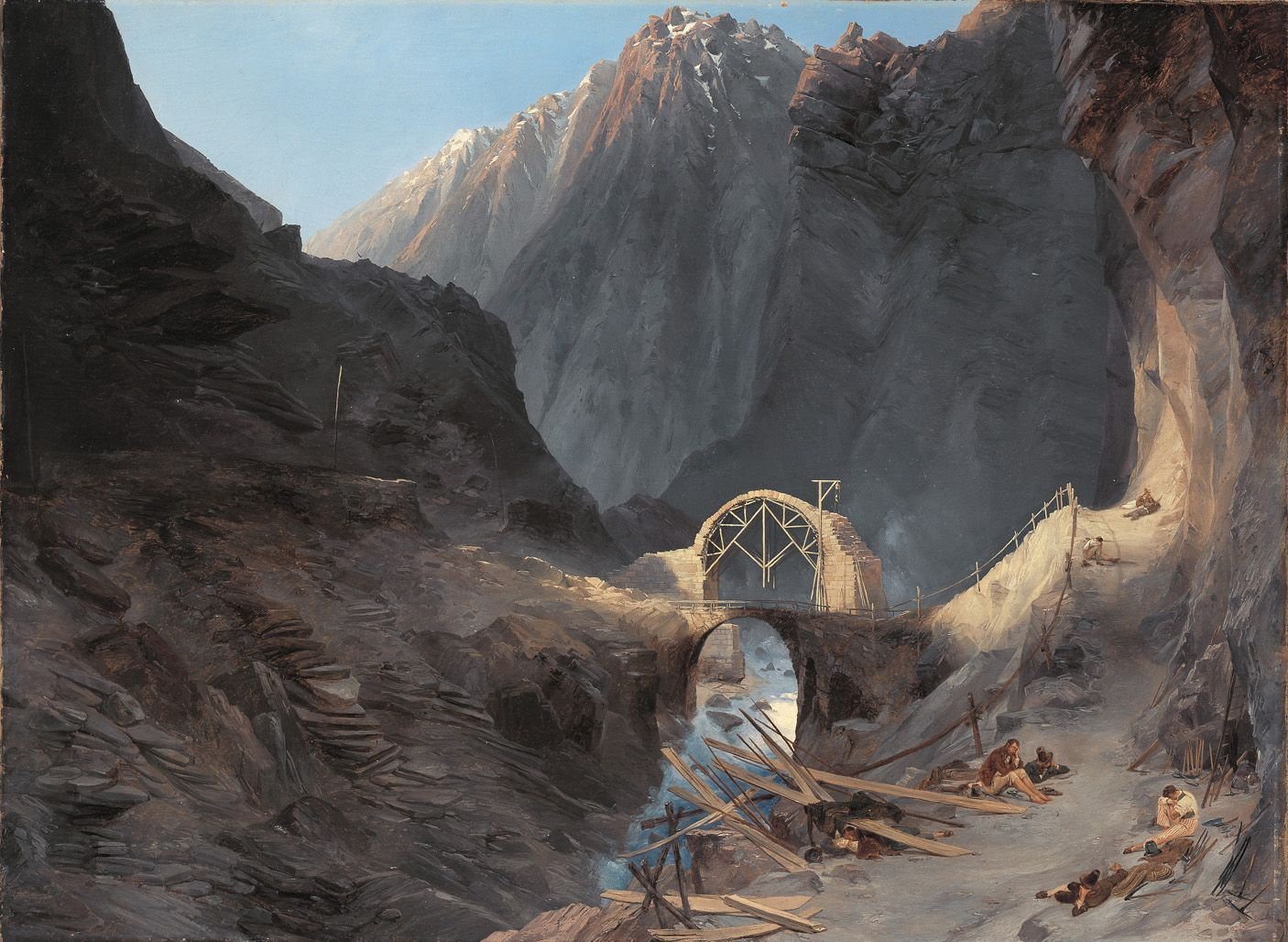
Building the Devil's Bridge (detail), Karl Blechen (c. 1833).

King posts were used in timber-framed roof construction in Roman buildings, and in medieval architecture in buildings such as parish churches and tithe barns. The oldest surviving roof truss in the world is a king post truss in Saint Catherine's Monastery, Egypt, built between 548 and 565.

King posts also appear in Gothic Revival architecture, Queen Anne style architecture and occasionally in modern construction. King post trusses are also used as a structural element in wood and metal bridges.

A painting by Karl Blechen circa 1833 illustrating construction of the second Devil's Bridge (Teufelsbrücke) in the Schöllenen Gorge shows multiple king posts suspended from the apex of the falsework upon which the masonry arch has been laid. In this example, beams in compression are supported by each king post several feet below the apex, and the bottom of the king posts can clearly be seen to be unsupported.

== Norman truss ==
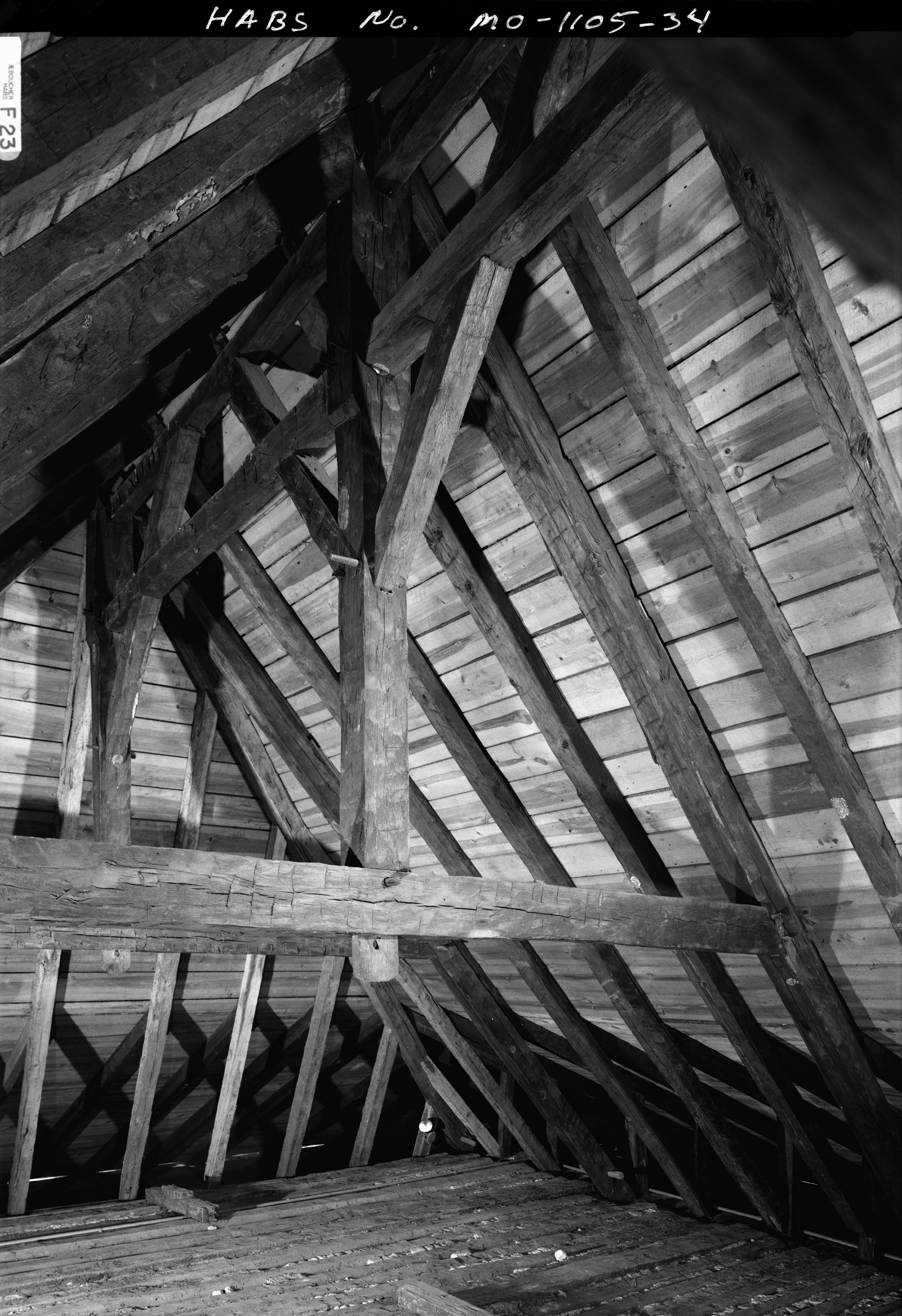
A Norman truss in the 18th-century Bolduc House in Ste. Genevieve, Missouri

Architectural historians in the French colonial cities St Louis, Missouri and New Orleans, Louisiana use the term "Norman roof" to refer to a steeply pitched roof; it is supported by what they call a "Norman truss" which is similar to a king post truss. This is a through-purlin truss consisting of a tie beam and paired truss blades, with a central king post to support the roof ridge. The name derives from a belief that this system of construction was introduced to North America by settlers from Normandy in northern France, but it is really a misnomer as the system was more widely used than that. The difference between a Norman truss and a king post truss is the tie beam in a Norman truss is technically a collar beam (a beam between the rafters above the rafter feet) where the king post truss the rafters land on top of a tie beam.

== Aviation ==
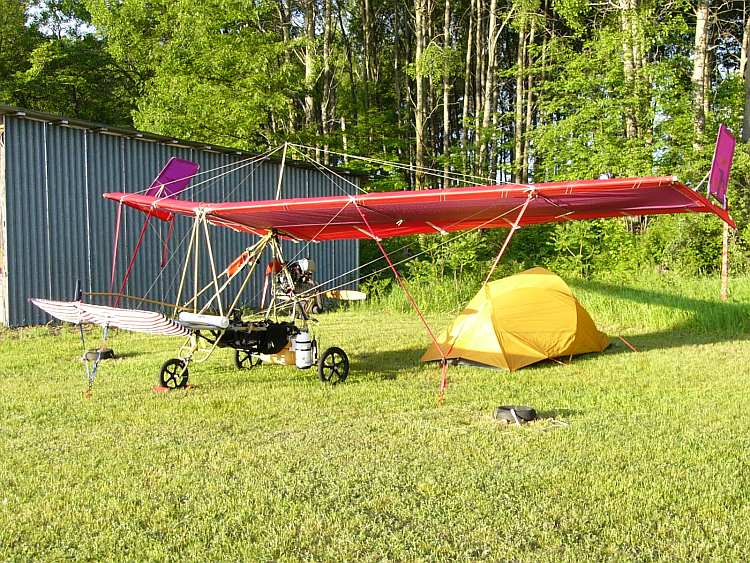
DFE Ascender III-C ultralight aircraft showing its king post above the wing

King posts are also used in the construction of some wire-braced aircraft, where a king post supports the top cables or "ground wires" supporting the wing. Only on the ground are these wires from the kingpost in tension, while in the air under positive g flight they are unloaded.

== Mechanical plant ==
The very robust hinge connecting the boom to the chassis in a backhoe, similar in function and appearance to a large automotive kingpin, is called a king post.

== Marine engineering ==
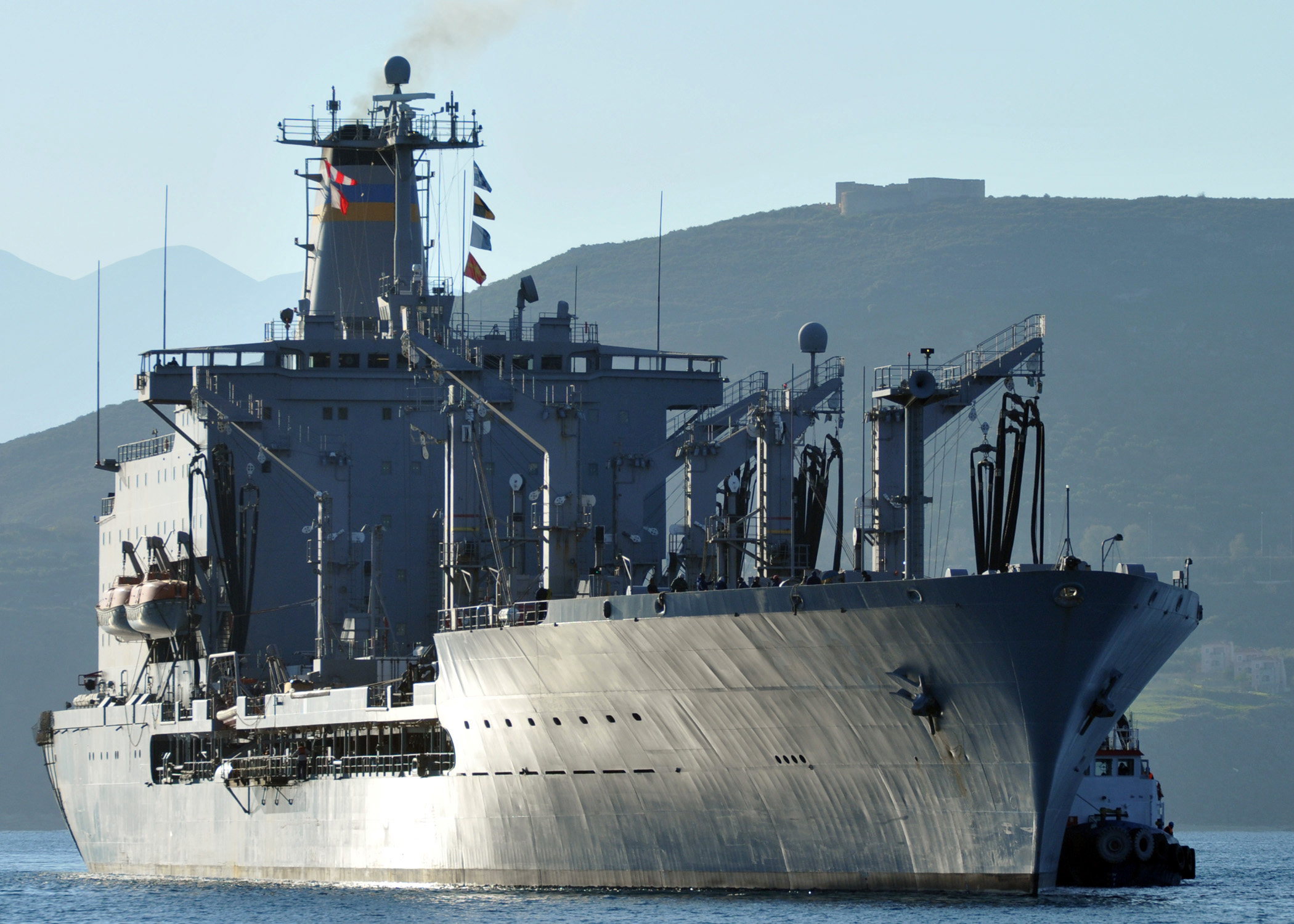
King posts on fleet oiler USNS Laramie support refueling gear.

On a cargo ship or oiler a king post is an upright with cargo-handling or fueling rig devices attached to it. On a cargo vessel king posts are designed for handling cargo, and so are located at the forward or after end of a hatch. For an oiler they are located over the fuel transfer lines.

== See also ==
- Strut
- Cabane strut
- Queen post
- Timber roof truss
