= Joseph Thurston =

Joseph Thurston may refer to:

- Joe Thurston (born 1979), American baseball player
- Joseph Thurston (poet) (1704–1732), English poet
