= Joseph Thurston (poet) =

English poet (1704–1732)

Joseph Thurston (16 June 1704 – 1732) was an English poet. His poetry was much appreciated by Alexander Pope.

== Life and education ==
Joseph Thurston was baptised in Colchester, Essex, as the eldest son of Joseph Thurston (1672/1673–1714), a lawyer, of Little Wenham, Suffolk, and Mary (baptised 1677, died 1736), the eldest daughter of Sir Isaac Rebow MP (1655–1726). His father was Recorder of Colchester, where the family had made their money as woollen drapers. Joseph the younger, the eldest son and fifth child in the family, was admitted to Westminster School, London, in February 1716 and to Gonville and Caius College, Cambridge on 13 April 1720.

There is no record of his Cambridge graduation. Although admitted to the Inner Temple on 25 July 1719, he was not called to the bar.

== Broome and Pope ==
Thurston became friendly with William Broome, a poet and translator, and the Church of England incumbent of parishes in Suffolk. Broome had been one of three who translated the Iliad into prose, and as an excellent Greek scholar, had joined Pope in translating several books of the Odyssey, in a style almost indistinguishable from Pope's. However, his own verses were of moderate merit.

Thurston became known to Pope through Broome. His first book, Poems on Several Occasions (1729), contains love poems and light verse. The Toilette (1730, in two editions) and his mock-heroic poem The Fall (1732) resemble in form Pope's The Rape of the Lock, but have merits of their own as well.

== Death ==
Thurston died unmarried on 22 December 1732 and was buried at Little Wenham a week later. He was survived by his mother, two sisters, and a younger brother, Thomas, who was in 1765 to sell the family seat at Little Wenham (now in the Wenham Parva parish of the Babergh District of Suffolk).

Thurston's fellow poet Thomas Edwards wrote about him in a letter of 16 January 1733. Pope, Edwards declared, had seen in Thurston "the most promising Genius that has appeared in England a great while." Edwards also made specific mention of Thurston's sweetness of temper and modesty, and of his "exceedingly charming" conversation.
