= William Broome =

English poet & translator (1689–1745)

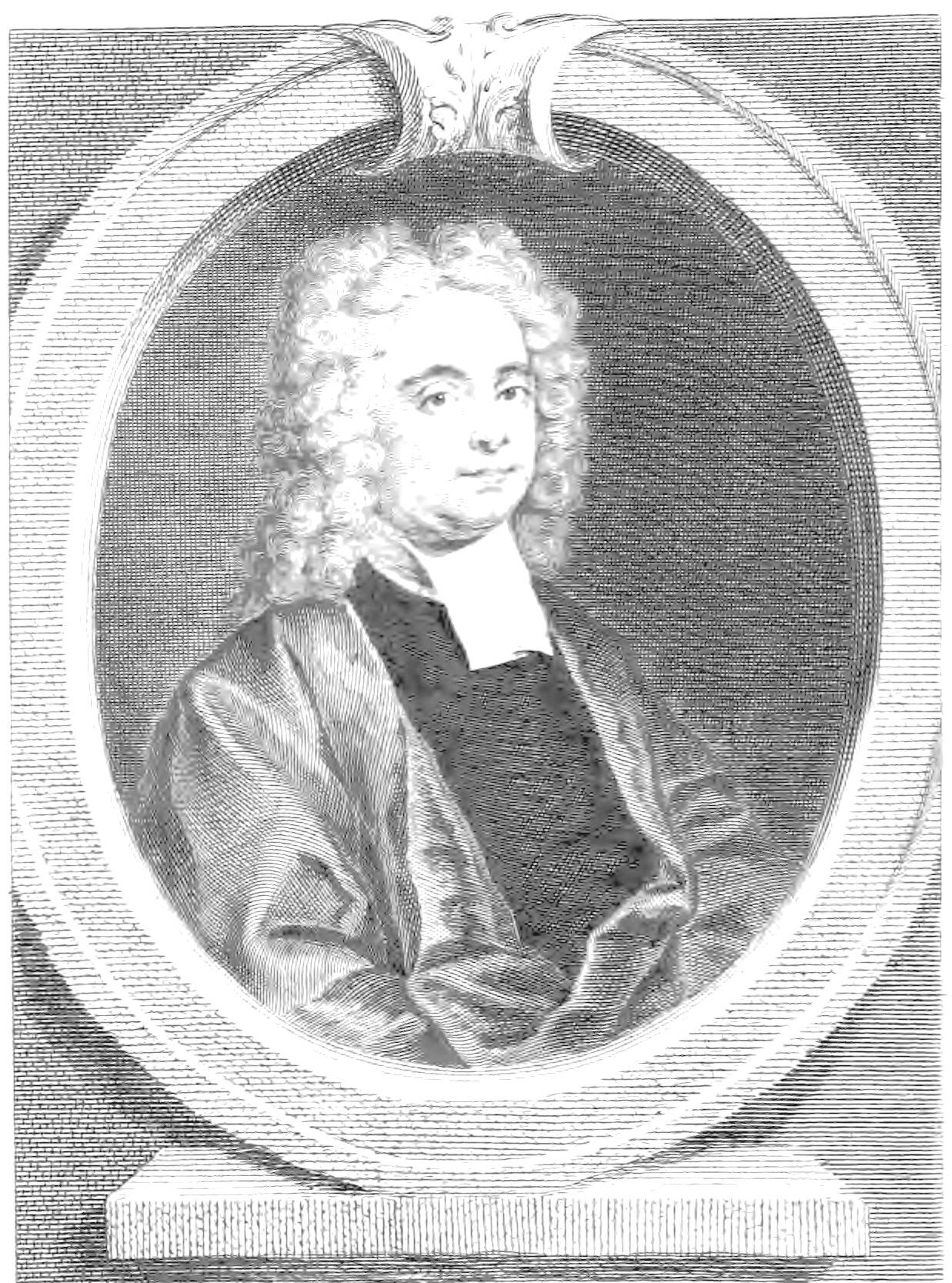
- Engraved likeness of Broome, printed as the frontispiece to Poems on Several Occasions, 2nd ed. (1739)
- Born: 1689; Haslington, Cheshire, England
- Died: 1745 (aged 55–56); Bath, Somerset, England
- Occupations: Poet, translator

William Broome (c. April 1689 – 16 November 1745) was an English poet and translator. He was born in Bromsgrove, near Birmingham, Cheshire and died in Bath.

== Education ==
He was educated at Eton and at St John’s College, Cambridge; entered the Church, and became rector of Sturston and later Pulham in Norfolk and Eye in Suffolk.

== Translations ==
Broome translated the Iliad in prose along with others, and was employed by Alexander Pope, whom he excelled as a Greek scholar, in translating the Odyssey, of which he Englished the 2nd, 6th, 8th, 11th, 12th, 16th, 18th, and 23rd books, catching the style of his master so exactly as almost to defy identification, and thus annoying him so as to earn a niche in The Dunciad. He also translated the Odes of Anacreon.

The verses of his own that he published had very moderate poetical merit. He became friendly with a younger poet whom Pope admired, Joseph Thurston.
