= All Saints Church, Little Wenham =

Coordinates: 52.0119°N 1.0309°E

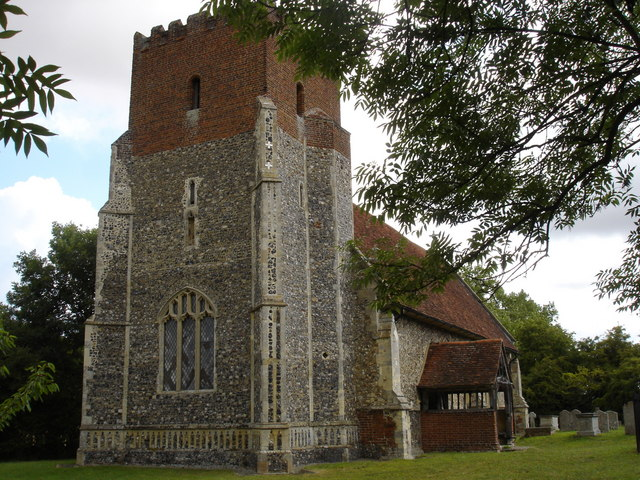
- All Saints Church, Little Wenham,

- Location in Suffolk
- OS grid reference: TM 081 392
- Location: Little Wenham, Suffolk
- Country: England
- Denomination: Anglican
- Website: Churches Conservation Trust

Architecture
- Functional status: Redundant
- Heritage designation: Grade I
- Designated: 22 February 1955
- Architectural type: Church
- Style: Gothic

Specifications
- Materials: Flint and brick Roofs tiled

All Saints Church is a redundant Anglican church in the village of Little Wenham, Suffolk, England. It is recorded in the National Heritage List for England as a designated Grade I listed building, and is under the care of the Churches Conservation Trust. It stands in an isolated position close to Little Wenham Hall, about 0.6 miles (1 km) to the northwest of Capel St. Mary.

== History ==
The church dates from the 13th century. The tower and the south porch were added in the 15th century, and in the following century the tower was raised by the addition of a bell chamber. A dedication to Saint Lawrence has also been associated with the church.

== Architecture ==
=== Exterior ===
All Saints is constructed in flint, with the top stage of the tower in brick. The porch is timber-framed, and the roofs are tiled. Its plan consists of a nave and a chancel, with a south porch and a west tower. The tower is in three stages, with angle buttresses decorated with flushwork. On the east of the south face is an angled stair turret. In the lowest stage of the tower is a window with three lights. The middle stage contains a small louvred trefoiled opening on the north, west and south sides. Under the opening on the west side is a niche. The top stage is battlemented and contains small bell openings. The east wall of the church has angle buttresses, and a parapet surmounted by a cross finial. The east window has three lights. Towards the east end of the north wall of the church is a two-light window with Y-tracery, and to its west is a lancet window, a three-light window, and a doorway. In the south wall, from the east are a six-light window set higher than the others, a doorway into the chancel, and three windows with Y-tracery. On the middle buttress are three scratch dials and the gnomon of a former sundial. The porch is timber-framed on a brick base. Above the doorway, in the gable, are three wooden niches.

=== Interior ===
The chancel is floored with medieval tiles and brick. On the sanctuary floor are five memorial floor slabs inscribed with dates in the 17th and 18th centuries. On the east wall are paintings. To the left of the east window is a painting of the Virgin with Child, and to the right of the window are three female saints under canopies, namely Saints Martha, Catherine and Mary Magdalene. In the north wall of the chancel is a structure decorated with shields which is either a tomb or an Easter sepulchre. In the south wall is an elaborate memorial to Sir John Brewse, who died in 1585. The memorial is brightly painted and contains the kneeling effigy of Sir John in a round-arched recess. To the sides of the recess are Corinthian columns supporting a pediment over which is a coat of arms. There are further coats of arms to the sides of the recess and in panels under the recess. The monument partly obscures the arches of a former sedilia. Above the priest's door in the south wall is a marble monument dated 1682. In the floor of the chancel is a medieval brass to the memory of Thomas Brewse, who died in 1514, and his wife. They are depicted standing side by side, and below them are their five children, two boys and three girls. This is said to be one of the best pre-Reformation brasses in the county.

Between the chancel and nave is the plastered stone base of the former rood screen. To each side of this, in the west wall, is a piscina. In the north wall of the nave is the doorway leading to stairs to the former rood loft. By the north wall of the nave is a medieval coffin lid. To the east of the north door is a wall painting of Saint Christopher and the Christ Child. To the west of the door is a board with the Lord's Prayer. In the south wall of the nave is a tomb chest with a large and elaborate canopy which is said to commemorate Gilbert de Debenham who died in 1371. The wooden hexagonal pulpit dates from the 17th or 18th century. Two of the pews are carved with linenfold panels and pilasters. The font dates from the 14th century and is carried on an octagonal stem. It still has traces of red paint. Above the tower arch is a round opening. In the tower is a wooden altar. The bell was cast by Thomas Gardiner of Sudbury in 1714.

== External features ==
In the churchyard is a table tomb with cast iron railings bearing the dates 1797 and 1799. It is designated as a Grade II listed building.

== See also ==
- List of churches preserved by the Churches Conservation Trust in the East of England
