= Little Wenham =

Village in Suffolk

Coordinates: 52.011°N 1.032°E

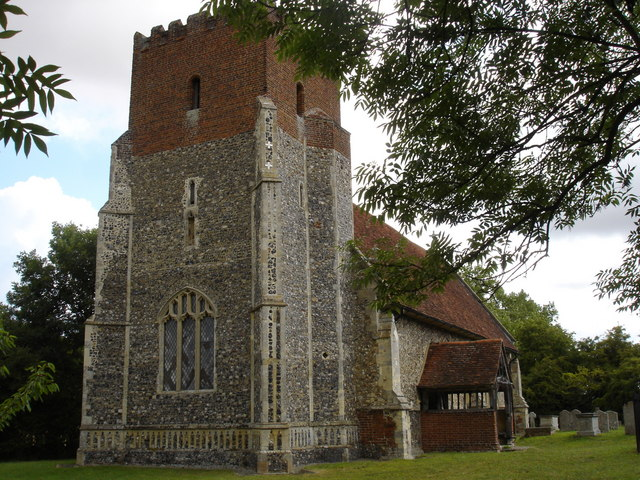
- Church of St Lawrence

- Location within Suffolk
- Civil parish: Wenham Parva
- District: Babergh
- Shire county: Suffolk
- Region: East
- Country: England
- Sovereign state: United Kingdom
- Post town: Colchester
- Postcode district: CO7

Little Wenham is a small village in Suffolk, England. It is part of the civil parish of Wenham Parva – the ancient name for Little Wenham) within Babergh district. Its population is included there.

== Heritage ==
The village is home to Little Wenham Hall, a castellated manor house and one of the oldest houses in England; built in the late 13th century using some of the first English-made bricks.

In later centuries it was the home of the Debenhams, who were notorious for violent and lawless behaviour, but who were so powerful in Suffolk that successive monarchs were forced to rely on their support rather than take steps to curb them. From the Debenhams it passed to their relations the Brewse (or Brewes) family.

The Grade I listed All Saints' Church, Little Wenham is currently redundant, but can be visited.

== Notable people ==
In birth order:

- Gilbert Debenham (1432–1500), born in Little Wenham, was a knight, politician and soldier attainted for treason by Henry VII, who spent his final years in prison. He appears often in the Paston Letters.
- Peyton Ventris (1645–1691) was a judge and politician born in Little Wenham. He was knighted in 1689.
- Joseph Thurston, (1704–1732), a poet much appreciated by Alexander Pope, was the son of Joseph Thurston (1672/1673–1714), a lawyer of Little Wenham, and was himself buried there.

== Facilities ==
There are weekday bus links with Ipswich four times a day. The nearest medical, retail, primary school and other services are at Capel St. Mary, 2–3 miles (3–5 km) away.
