= Plaxtol =

Coordinates: 51°15′33″N 0°17′41″E

- Village and civil parish
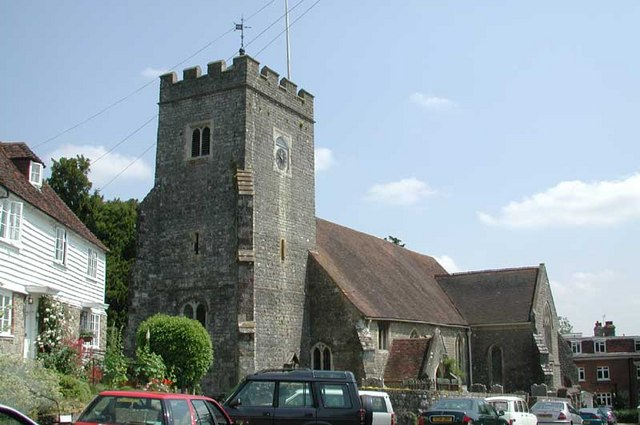
- Plaxtol Parish Church

- Location within Kent
- Population: 1,117 (2011)
- OS grid reference: TQ603535
- Civil parish: Plaxtol
- District: Tonbridge and Malling
- Shire county: Kent
- Region: South East
- Country: England
- Sovereign state: United Kingdom
- Post town: SEVENOAKS
- Postcode district: TN15
- Dialling code: 01732
- Police: Kent
- Fire: Kent
- Ambulance: South East Coast
- UK Parliament: Tonbridge

Plaxtol is a village and civil parish in the borough of Tonbridge and Malling in Kent, England. The village is located around 5 miles (8 km) north of Tonbridge and the same distance east of Sevenoaks. In the 2011 Census, the parish had a population of 1,117.

The name Plaxtol is believed to be derived from Old English words meaning "play area"; there used to be a large green in the middle of the village where children would play after attending church on a Sunday.

The current parish church building dates from 1648, in the Commonwealth period. The River Bourne flows through the parish, and formerly powered three watermills in Plaxtol – Winfield Mill (corn), Longmill (corn) and Roughway Paper Mill. The village has a primary school, a village shop, a pottery school and a pub; it also once had a bakery and a butcher.

The 1,000-acre Fairlawne Estate adjoining the village of Shipbourne was owned by Sir Henry Vane the Elder, in the 17th century, and was owned by the Cazalet family in the 19th century. Major Peter Cazalet was a trainer of horses owned by Queen Elizabeth The Queen Mother who was an occasional guest. The estate was then owned by the Saudi Arabian horse-breeder Prince Khalid ibn Abdullah until his death in 2021.

== Notable residents ==
- Air Chief Marshal Sir Lewis Hodges died in Plaxtol in 2007.
- Walter Monckton, 1st Viscount Monckton of Brenchley was born in Plaxtol in 1891. His father was a paper manufacturer in the village.
- The teacher and theatre director Richard Tomlinson lived in the village in the 1990s.

== See also ==
Listed buildings in Plaxtol
