= Collar beam =

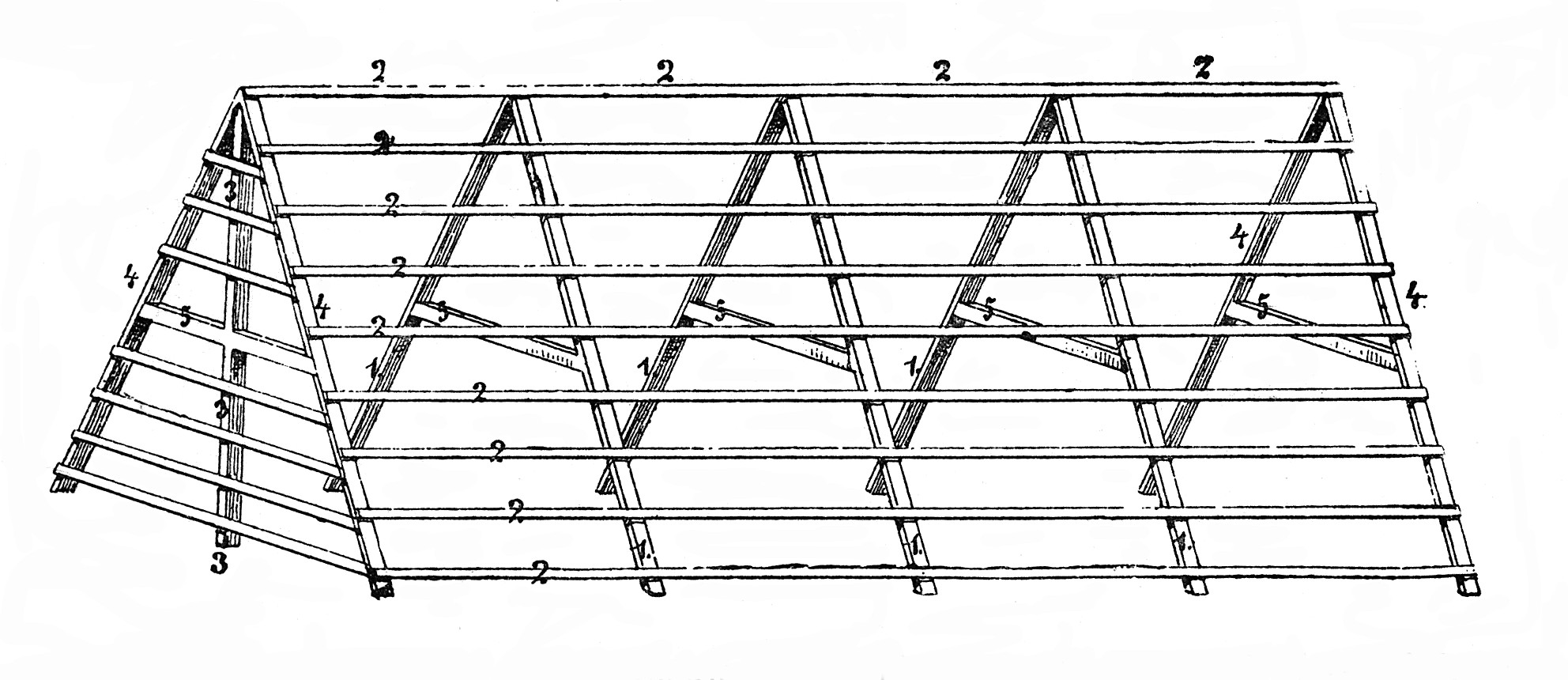
Roof framing: element #5 is the collars

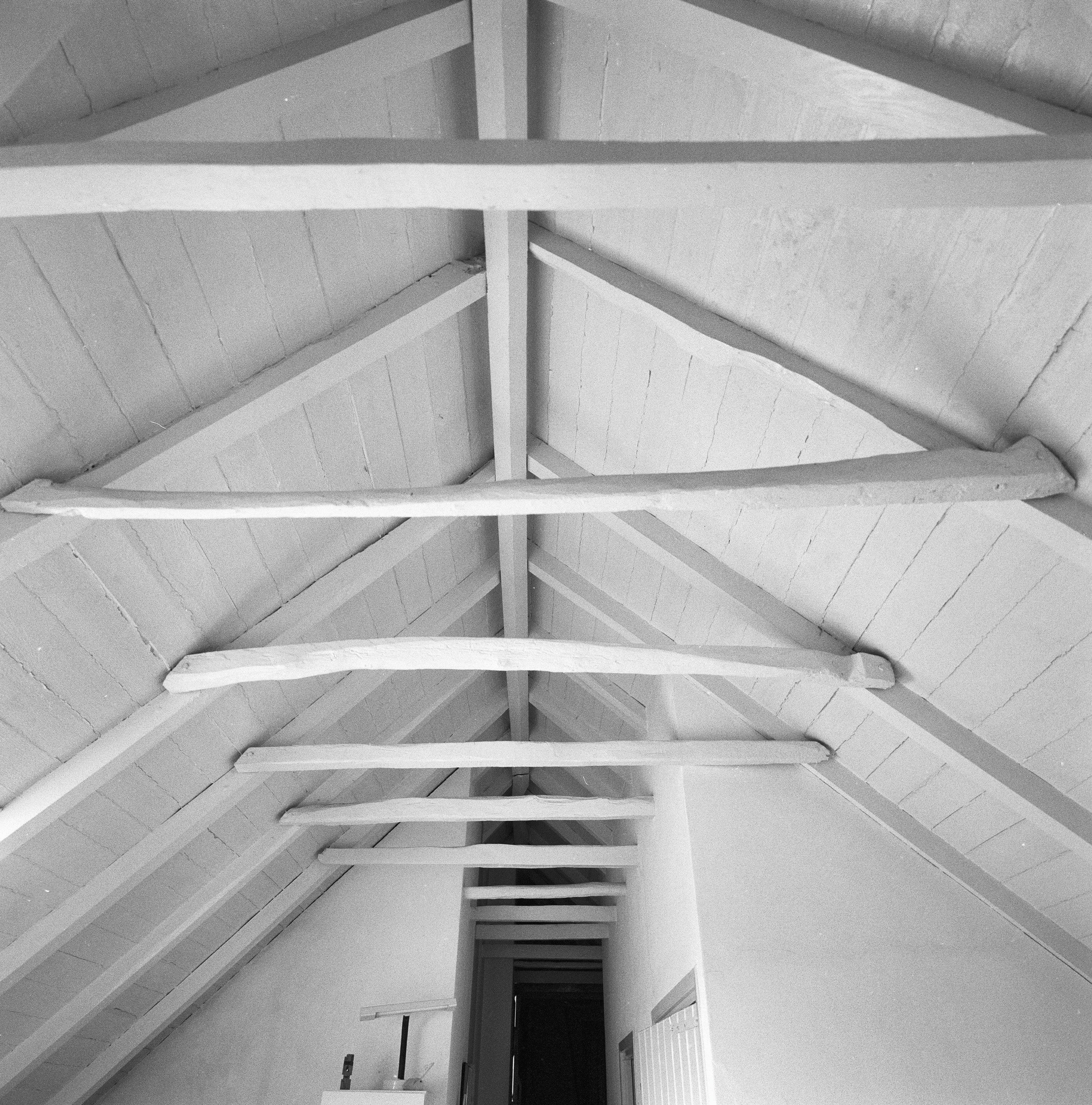
An old collar beam roof in the Netherlands

A collar beam or collar is a horizontal structural member placed between two rafters to resist compression. Common in domestic roof construction to prevent rafter sag, a collar beam is often colloquially called a collar tie, but is unlikely to be one unless placed high or low on the rafter, as a tie in building construction is an element in tension rather than compression. A collar placed near the top of the rafter is in tension, as is one placed below its midpoint towards the bottom. Each would keep the rafters from spreading, and be correctly called a collar tie. A collar beam may also double as a ceiling joist, providing a member for attaching drywall or other material while also serving to resist rafter sag.

== Etymology ==
Collar in general comes from Latin collare meaning neck.

== Collar beam roofs ==
The simplest form of roof framing is a common rafter roof. This roof framing has nothing but rafters and a tie beam at the bottoms of the rafters. The next step in the development of roof framing was to add a collar, called a collar beam roof. Collar beam roofs are suitable for spans up to around (4.5 meters).

== Crown post roof framing ==
A crown post is a compression member, a post, in roof framing which carries a longitudinal beam called a crown plate. The crown plate in turn carries collar beams which help support and carry the rafters, thus collar beams are always found in crown post roof framing.

== Arched brace roof ==
The arch brace truss is made by adding two braces between the rafters and collar. This puts the collar and the braces in tension.
