= Margaret Wood (archaeologist) =

British archaeologist

Margaret Envys Wood, later Margaret Kaines-Thomas (5 July 1908 – 13 June 1981) FSA was an English archaeologist and author specialising in the domestic and vernacular architecture of the Middle Ages.

== Biography ==
Wood was born in Chorlton, Lancashire. She completed an MA and D.Lit and was an elected Fellow of the Society of Antiquaries.

=== Architectural career ===
Her specialist field was in English medieval domestic architecture and she was a member of the Vernacular Architecture Group. Wood undertook her archaeological training at the Courtauld under Sir Mortimer Wheeler. Wheeler, a hugely influential figure in the world of archaeology, contributed the preface to Wood's principal work The English Mediaeval House. In 1935, she wrote an article titled Norman Domestic Architecture in which she thanked A. W. Clapham for his assistance. Wood also wrote the official Ministry of Works guides for Burton Agnes Old Manor House (Yorkshire), Christchurch Castle Hall (Dorset), Old Soar (Kent), and Donnington Castle (Berkshire). Urban T. Holmes called Wood "one of the foremost experts on the medieval house".

Wood is praised for writing the first volume dedicated to medieval domestic architecture since the publication Some Account of Domestic Architecture in England in 1851 by Hudson Turner, and its continuation after his death by John Henry Parker, which remained the authority on the subject until Wood's book The English Mediaeval House was published in 1965. Each chapter of the book focuses on different elements of the medieval house, from the Hall to the Solar, the Parlour and Gatehouse, and on particular types of houses, including Tower Houses and Lodgings. It was reprinted many times and is still considered an essential text on the subject.

Wood was a member of the Historical Association. She was also a member of the St Albans and Hertfordshire Architectural and Archaeological Society.

=== Photography ===
A number of photographs attributed to her appear in the collections of Historic England and comprise negatives and prints. This material has not yet been fully catalogued.

Photographs attributed to Wood appear in the Conway Library at the Courtauld Institute of Art. This collection is in the process of being digitised and is part of a wider project Courtauld Connects.

== Personal life ==
In 1952 she married Evelyn George Kaines-Thomas (1892–1987).

== Bibliography ==
- Margaret Wood (1965) The English Mediaeval House, Phoenix House, London.
- Margaret Wood (1964) Donnington Castle, Berkshire, Official Guide, HMSO, London.
- Spittle, S.T.D. (1965) The English Mediaeval House by Margaret Wood, Archaeological Journal, 122:1, 254–255, DOI
