= Wenham Parva =

Civil parish in Suffolk, England

Coordinates: 52.016°N 1.031°E

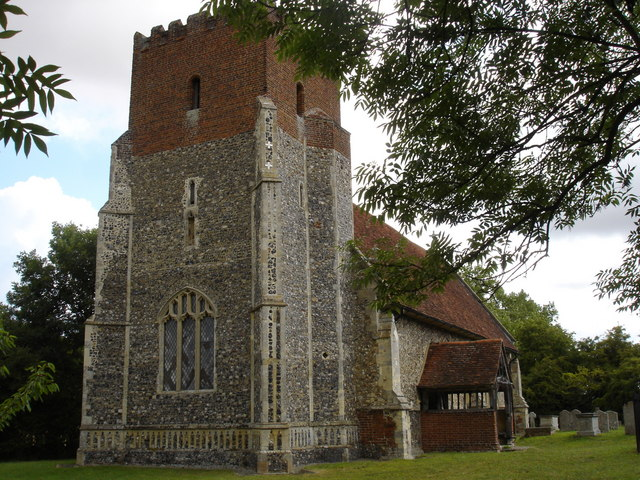
- Little Wenham - Church of St Lawrence

- Location within Suffolk
- Population: 20 (2005)
- Civil parish: Wenham Parva
- District: Babergh
- Shire county: Suffolk
- Region: East
- Country: England
- Sovereign state: United Kingdom

Wenham Parva is a civil parish in the Babergh district, in the county of Suffolk, England. It covers the village of Little Wenham (whose ancient name it takes) and the hamlet of Wenham Grange. It had a population of 20 in 2005, making it the joint-least populated parish in Suffolk alongside South Cove, Wangford and Wordwell.

The parish contains the Wenham Thicks nature reserve, which is a Scheduled Monument due to its Ancient Woodland. The defunct Hadleigh branch line ran through the centre of the parish.
