= Old Soar Manor =

Historic manor house in Plaxtol, Kent, UK

Coordinates: 51.2623°N 0.3197°E

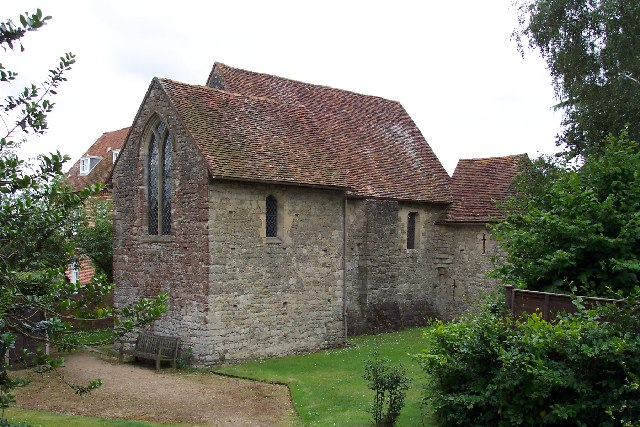
Old Soar Manor

Old Soar Manor is an English Heritage property, owned and maintained by the National Trust. Located near Plaxtol, Kent, England, it is a small 13th century stone manor house. It is listed Grade I on the National Heritage List for England.

Built in 1290, the manor originally belonged to the Culpepper family. The centre of the house was originally the great hall but this no longer exists, as it was demolished in 1780 and replaced with the red-brick farmhouse on the site. The farmhouse is Grade II listed. Visitors today can see the solar, latrine and chapel which remain.
